= Double tap =

Double tap may refer to:

Military

- Double tap strike, a tactic in which an area is bombed a second time to target those who respond to the first strike.
- Double tap (shooting technique), a shooting technique where shots are fired in rapid succession.

In arts and entertainment:

- Double Tap (film), a Hong Kong action film
- "Double Tap" (Jordin Sparks song), a 2015 song by Jordin Sparks
- "Double Tap" (Ministry song), a 2012 song by industrial metal band Ministry
- Zombieland: Double Tap, 2019 film sequel to Zombieland

In technology:

- SRAM Double Tap, a shift lever technology from SRAM Corporation
- DoubleTap derringer, a small double barreled pistol
- Double tap, a form of the medical procedure tympanocentesis
- Double tap, the touchscreen equivalent of double-clicking
- Double tap, to tap a multi-touch touchscreen with two fingers simultaneously
