= Racing bicycle =

Bicycle designed for competitive road cycling

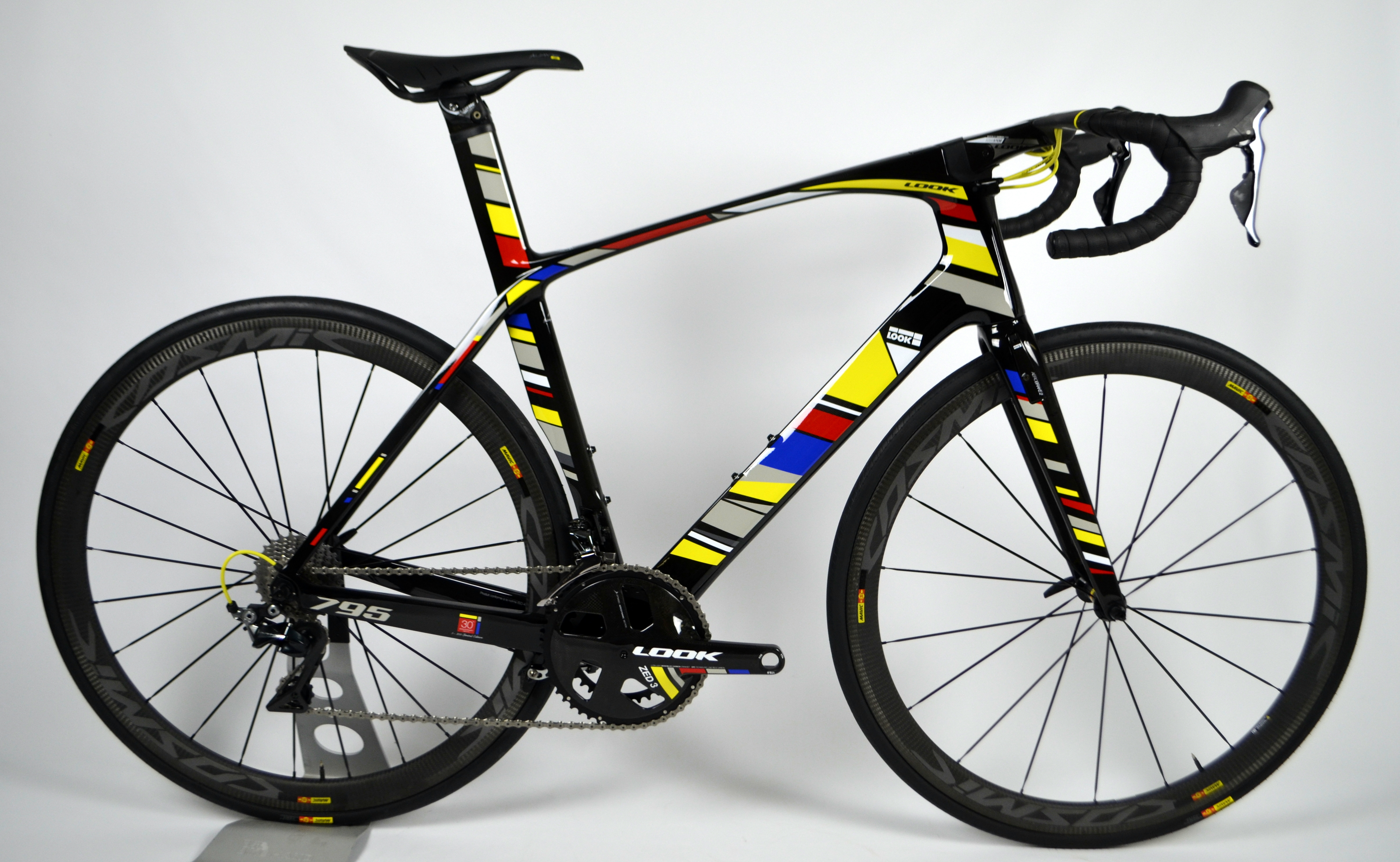
A carbon fiber frame racing bicycle by the French company LOOK

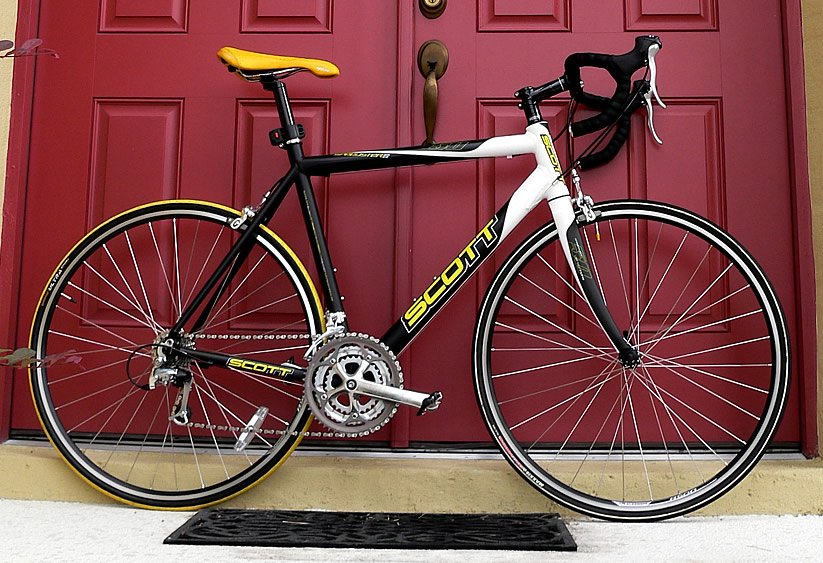
A road bicycle made by Scott

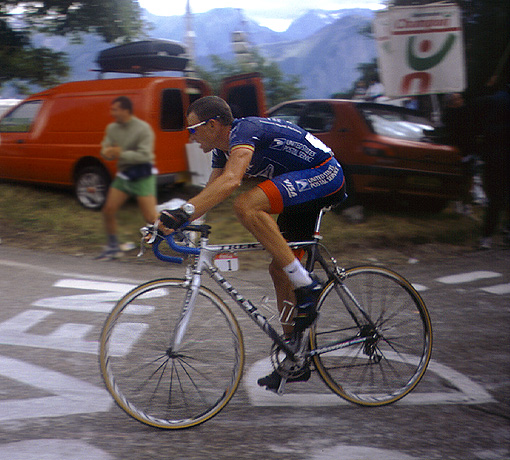
Lance Armstrong riding in a posture often used on a road bicycle

A racing bicycle, also known as a road bike, is a bicycle designed for competitive road cycling, a sport governed by and according to the rules of the Union Cycliste Internationale (UCI).

Racing bicycles are designed for maximum performance while remaining legal under the UCI rules. They are designed to minimise aerodynamic drag, rolling resistance, and weight, and balance the desire for stiffness for pedaling effiency with the need for some flexibility for comfort. Racing bicycles sacrifice comfort for speed compared to non-racing bicycles. The drop handlebars are positioned lower than the saddle to put the rider in a more aerodynamic posture. The front and back wheels are close together so the bicycle has quick handling, which is preferred by experienced racing cyclists. The derailleur gear ratios are closely spaced so that the rider can pedal at their optimum cadence. However, racing bicycles must retain the ability to maneuver safely within a tightly packed peloton, and be sufficiently comfortable to ride for races of six hours or more.

Bicycles and most wheels ridden in professional competition must be type-approved by the UCI, and made available for commercial sale. It is common for professional road cycling teams to use prototype bicycles and equipment before they become commercially available.

Racing bicycles are generally legal for use on public roads and are widely used for non-racing fitness and utility riding.

== Distinction between road bicycles and others ==
Bicycles for racing on velodromes are track bicycles; bicycles for racing off-road are mountain bicycles, cyclo-cross bicycles, gravel bicycles or cycle speedway bicycles; bicycles that race according to the rules of the International Human Powered Vehicle Association include faired recumbent bicycles which, on flat ground, are the fastest bicycles in the world. Recumbents were excluded from the UCI definition of a bicycle on 1 April 1934.

Time trial bicycles are a subset of road bicycles that are designed for time trial events. The UCI rules for these bikes are slightly less prescriptive than those for "massed start road races" (see rules 1.3.020 to 1.3.023).

Triathlon bicycles are governed by World Triathlon rules, which allow more recent technological developments than do the UCI rules.

Due to the lower air resistance and better body stance for pushing, road bicycles are more efficient for smooth road use. Cyclo-cross bicycles, used for racing on off-road circuits, are closer to racing bikes than mountain bikes. They have wider, treaded tires and are less efficient than racing bikes at higher speeds on sealed roads. Gravel bicycles evolved from cyclo-cross bicycles and are drop-bar bicycles designed for riding on maintained but unsealed roads, often over very long distances.

== Frame ==
The frame of a road bicycle must, according to the UCI regulations, be constructed using a "main triangle" with three straight tubular shapes—the top tube, down tube, and seat tube. These three tubes, and other parts of the frame, need not be cylindrical, however, and many racing bicycles feature frames that use alternative shapes. Traditionally, the top tube of a racing bicycle is close to parallel with the ground when the bicycle is in its normal upright position. Some racing bicycles, however, have a top tube that slopes down towards the rear of the bicycle; the "compact" frame geometry was popularized by Giant.

Frame manufacturers are free to use any material they choose in the frame. For most of the history of road racing, bicycle frames were constructed from steel tubing, and aluminium and titanium alloys were also used successfully in racing bicycles. Racing bicycles in these three materials are still commercially available and are still used by some amateur racing cyclists or in vintage racing classes. However, virtually all professional road racing cyclists now use frames constructed from various carbon fiber composite materials, and a typical modern carbon fiber frame weighs less than 1 kg (2.2 lbs).

Particularly since the introduction of carbon fiber frames, the shape of the tubes that make up the frame has increasingly diverged from the traditional cylinder, either to modify the ride characteristics of the bicycle, reduce weight, or simply achieve styling differentiation. However, a recent trend in road bicycle frame design is tubing claimed to reduce aerodynamic drag, adopting many design features from time trial bicycles, and the majority of top-level teams use bikes with aerodynamic tube shaping at least some of the time.

Unlike mountain bikes, most road bicycles do not have a dedicated suspension. The majority of damping is provided by the tires, padding in a cyclist's clothing, seat, and handlebar tape. Wheels, frames, and forks provide a limited amount of flex, and manufacturers tune the thickness and construction of frame tubing to offer the best compromise between a stiff frame (desired for pedalling efficiency, particularly when sprinting) and ride comfort. Additionally, a few manufacturers offer racing bicycles using additional flexing points or vibration-absorbing materials at key points in the frame for additional comfort.

== Wheels and tires ==
Most road bicycles use 700C bicycle wheels (622 mm bead seat diameter), with matching tyres that are 23-28 mm wide. Wider tires became more common over the 2010s, as more sophisticated measurement showed that wider tires increase rider comfort, improve grip, and decrease rolling resistance without unduly affecting aerodynamics.

The wheels greatly affect the performance of a racing bike. The rim of the wheel can be shaped for greater aerodynamic efficiency making a triangular cross-section to form a teardrop with the tire.

For aerodynamics and rotating weight, it is generally better to reduce the number of spokes in the wheel. For high-end wheelsets, the spokes can be shaped to have a bladed cross-section, further reducing wind resistance.

The most common wheel material for professional racing is now molded carbon fiber rims being a popular choice for pro-level racers and enthusiasts. Aluminium rims are still widely used outside racing and by some less well-funded amateur racers. Carbon fiber rims are lighter than the same shape in aluminium, allowing riders to choose "deeper", more aerodynamic rims without an unacceptable weight penalty. Race-grade wheelsets are very expensive and often fragile. Riders who race often choose to own at least two pairs of wheels: a heavier, more durable, and cheaper wheelset for training, and a lighter, more aerodynamic wheelset for racing. Racers with sufficient resources may have multiple racing wheelsets to choose from depending on the course and weather conditions; deeper rims lose their aerodynamic advantage, and are hard to control, in high crosswinds, and on mountainous courses the lightest possible wheelset may be preferred by some riders.

To reduce both air resistance and rolling resistance on the road, tires are lightweight, narrow, and have a thin, smooth tread. Track racing tires can be inflated up to circa 200 pounds per square inch (14 bar). Tires for road racing used to be inflated to pressures almost as high in the belief that this minimised rolling resistance. However, it was discovered that on real road surfaces, much lower tyre pressures or around 70 pounds per square inch (4.8 bar), depending on rider weight and conditions, result in both a more comfortable ride and lower rolling resistance. Until recently, most racing bikes used tubular tires which have no beads: they are sewn around the tube and glued to the rim. These tires provide an advantage in weight (lacking the relatively heavy wire bead), grip and pinch flat protection, but their greatest advantage lies in the ability to use a very lightweight simple box-section rim, rather than the U-shaped clincher rim. A U-shaped clincher rim must be made of relatively heavier gauge material to prevent the tire pressure from spreading the inherently weak U shape and allowing the tire to come off the rim. Advances in tire technology, however, have seen the far more practical (due to greater ease of changeability) clincher (beaded) tire close the gap. Some teams are using tubeless tires, which are claimed to offer the resistance to pinch flats of tubular tires, as well as greater ease of fitment and lower rolling resistance than tubulars.

Wheel moment of inertia is a controversial subject. In this article: wheel theory, the author does some calculations on wheel effects. Moment of inertia changes result in a decrease in watts of between .004 and .022%, while lower mass provided between .2 and .46%, and better aerodynamics provided between .6 and 1.8% decrease in power. Based on this it can be argued that wheel moment of inertia effects are neither noticeable nor important. At the same time, a product launched in 2008 to dynamically alter the rotating inertia of bicycle wheels claims to have "outperformed the standard, equivalent wheel by 5.6 seconds per mile" (or about 3.5 seconds per km).

== Components ==
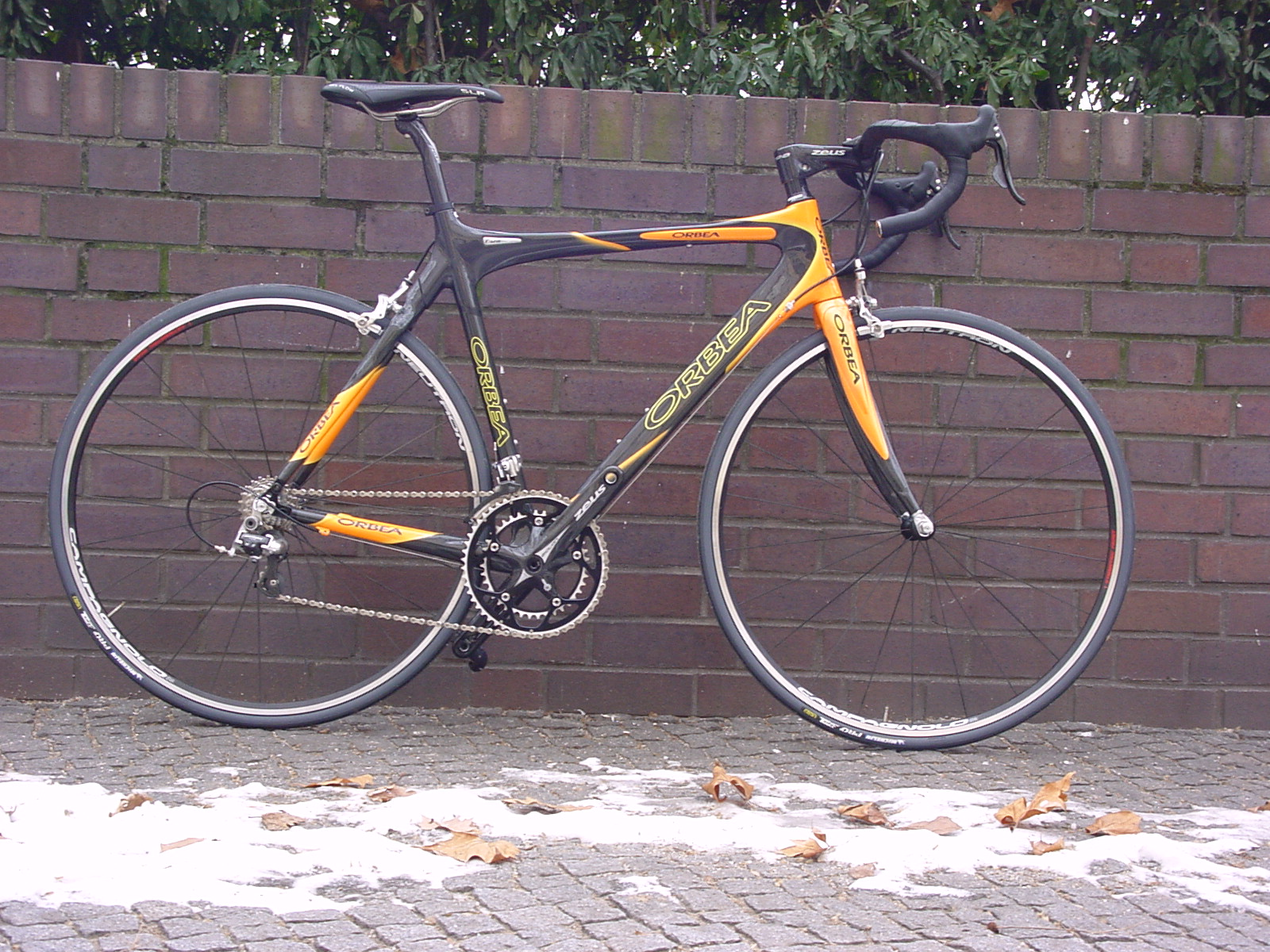
The components of a road bike

Road bike components are collectively referred to as the groupset. The quality of the groupset determines how refined the bike feels, how much maintenance it requires, and contributes to the performance of the bike. The three major groupset manufacturers of complete groupsets for racing bicycles are Shimano, SRAM, and Campagnolo. Some companies only produce specific components of the groupset, such as Full Speed Ahead (often abbreviated to FSA). The companies have different design strategies, and some cyclists have great brand loyalty for one or the other.

In the early 1990s, Shimano introduced dual-control with a system called Shimano Total Integration (STI). STI is characterized by its combined brake and shift levers, or "brifters". Previously, the shifters were mounted on the stem, handlebar ends or the down tube of the frame. Dual control addressed the problem of having to reposition a hand to change gears. STI was followed by the competing Campagnolo/Sachs Ergolever. SRAM uses a technology known as Double Tap for their integrated shifter/brake lever.

In the mid-1990s Mavic, known for their wheelsets, introduced an electronic shifting system which was pioneered in the Tour de France by American Greg LeMond and later on by Briton Chris Boardman, who liked the fact that the system allowed him to shift from his aerobars and his brake levers. The system did not catch on due to technological hurdles. In 2009, Shimano commercially released the Dura-Ace Di2 electronic shifter, and Campagnolo and SRAM followed suit in the early 2010s. As of 2022, the vast majority of top-level professional teams use electronic shifting, as do many amateur riders. Mechanical derailleurs remain popular with amateur racers and recreational riders for cost reasons.

Groupset manufacturers have gradually increased the number of gears on racing bicycles, allowing a greater range between the highest and lowest gears while maintaining relatively small gaps between each successive gear. As of 2022, most racing bicycles used in professional racing have 2 front chainrings and 11 or 12 gears on the rear cassette.

Carbon fiber has also become more popular for components. Shimano, Campagnolo and SRAM have introduced carbon fiber for their high-end shifters and brake levers, cranks, and parts of their derailleurs. Carbon fiber stems, handlebars, shoe soles, forks and seatposts are also more commonplace, including integrated stem/handlebar combinations. The advantages of carbon fiber are low weight as well as increased vibration damping leading to a more comfortable ride.

As of 2022, the majority of professional teams use hydraulic disc brakes for most or all races. A few top-level professional teams still use bikes with caliper brakes in mountain stages, as their disc-brake models are significantly heavier than the UCI's legal minimum weight of 6.8 kg. Disc brakes offer better stopping performance, particularly in wet conditions. For many years, racing bicycles were required to use caliper brakes by UCI regulation, but manufacturers began producing road bikes with disc brakes for recreational use in the mid-2010s, and their use was trialled in professional racing in 2016 and 2017. Rider disquiet over the crash safety of disc brakes led to the introduction of versions with chamfered edges to reduce the risk of the rotating disc acting as a cutting blade. In 2018, the UCI concluded the trial and legalised the use of disc brakes in all road racing events.

== Non-competitive uses ==
Road bicycles are built for casual recreational use, often labeled as "sportif" bicycles or "dropped-bar fitness bikes". These have much in common with a competitive racing bicycle, but the frame geometry is relaxed to make the bicycle more comfortable over long distances, though less effective for short bursts of speed. They usually have a wider range of gear ratios (with greater gaps between each ratio) and fewer high-tech racing features.

For recreational road cycling, road-style bicycles with drop handlebars were the norm in the 1980s, along with the touring bicycle (a drop-handlebar bike with a slightly longer wheelbase to provide a smoother ride and less sensitivity to steer and balance disturbances). These designs, called "road bikes" or colloquially, "roadies" or "racing bikes", have become less popular in recent years. The Mountain bike geometry, with its straight handlebars and upright sitting position (resembling the city bike), have moved into the high-performance spaces, and high production volumes have brought down costs significantly.

== UCI rules ==
The UCI rules currently specify that a road bicycle have the following characteristics:

- be a vehicle with a front wheel steered by a handlebar and a rear wheel driven by a system comprising pedals and a chain by the legs moving in a circular movement
- that the only points of support are the following: the feet on the pedals, the hands on the handlebars and the seat on the saddle
- wheels must be of equal diameter, between 70 cm and 55 cm, and must have minimum 12 spokes; spokes can be round, flattened or oval, as far as no dimension of their sections exceeds 10 mm
- maximum length 185 cm
- maximum width 50 cm
- the peak of the saddle must be at least 5 cm behind a vertical plane passing through the bottom bracket spindle
- the saddle must be between 24 cm and 30 cm in length
- the distance between the bottom bracket spindle and the ground must be between 24 cm and 30 cm
- the distance between the vertical passing through the lower bracket spindle and the front wheel spindle must be between 54 cm and 65 cm
- the distance between the vertical passing through the bottom bracket spindle and the rear wheel spindle must be between 35 cm and 50 cm
- the maximum internal distance between the front fork ends is 10.5 cm, and of the rear stays 13.5 cm
- minimum mass 6.8 kg (14.99 lb)
- frame must be built around a main triangle, constructed of tubular elements (that may have non-circular cross-sections) such that the form of each encloses a straight line
- The maximum height of the frame elements shall be 8 cm and the minimum thickness 2.5 cm. The minimum thickness shall be reduced to 1 cm for the chain stays and the seat stays. The minimum thickness of the elements of the front fork shall be 1 cm; these may be straight or curved. The top tube may slope, provided that this element fits within a horizontal template defined by a maximum height of 16 cm and a minimum thickness of 2.5 cm

Note that the regulations regarding the dimensions of the bike are allowed exception, given that the rider can demonstrate a morphological need for the exception based on limb size or other factors.

These rules effectively and purposely rule out recumbent bicycles, and have done so since 1934.

== See also ==
- Bicycle
- Bicycle frame
- Bicycle racing
- Outline of cycling
- Road cycling
