= Permawar =

Song by Ministry

"PermaWar"

Single by Ministry

from the album From Beer to Eternity
- Released: August 9, 2013
- Genre: Industrial metal, alternative metal
- Length: 4:56
- Label: 13th Planet
- Songwriter: Al Jourgensen
- Producers: Al Jourgensen; Sammy D'Ambruoso

Ministry singles chronology
"Double Tap" (2012)	"PermaWar" (2013)	"Dancing Madly Backwards" (2017)

"Permawar" (stylized as "PermaWar") is a song by American industrial metal band Ministry. It is the third track and the only single from the band's thirteenth studio album, From Beer to Eternity. It was released on August 9, 2013, as a digital download.

== Lyrics ==
According to Al Jourgensen's interview with Kenny Herzog of Spin magazine, "PermaWar" is based on Rachel Maddow's book Drift: The Unmooring of American Military Power. The song lyrically criticizes "the multi-million dollar industry that war has become".

== Music video ==
The music video for the song was filmed at Jourgensen's 13th Planet compound in El Paso, Texas. It was produced by Jourgensen's wife, Angelina Lukacin-Jourgensen, and directed by filmmaker and animator Zach Passero, who also directed other Ministry music videos, including "Lieslieslies", "GhoulDiggers" and "99 Percenters".

Like the song, the music video draws upon political themes. In the video, Jourgensen portrays three different personalities, taking the form of three different points of view on America's policies on war: the corrupt political leader, the predatory business man and the passive observer. The music video also features vintage clips of missile launches, trenches with dead bodies, and military exercises, which were taken from footage of World War II, Vietnam, Afghanistan and Iraq. It also contains audio samples of president Barack Obama's speeches about terrorism.

== Personnel ==
=== Ministry ===
- Al Jourgensen – vocals, rhythm guitar
- Mike Scaccia – lead guitar
- Sin Quirin – lead guitar
- Tony Campos – bass
- Aaron Rossi – drums

=== Additional personnel ===
- Al Jourgensen – production, mixing
- Sammy D'Ambruoso – production
- Aaron Havill – keyboards, engineering
- Allan Amato – artwork
