= Individual time trial =

Road bicycle race time trial for an individual

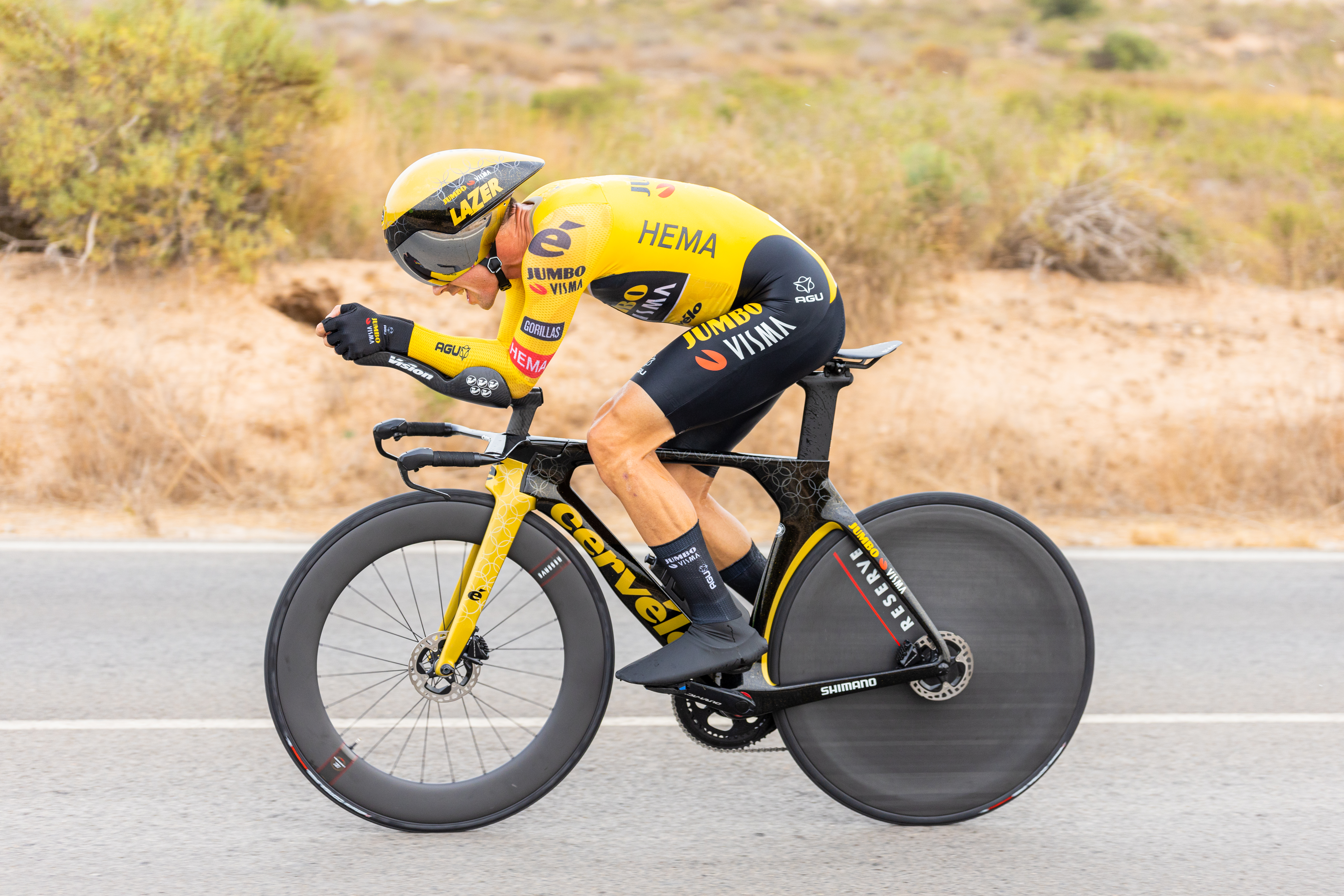
Primož Roglič riding a time trial bicycle in the 2022 Vuelta a España

An individual time trial (ITT) is a road bicycle race in which cyclists race alone against the clock (in French: contre la montre – literally "against the watch", in Italian: tappa a cronometro "stopwatch stage"). There are also track-based time trials where riders compete in velodromes, and team time trials (TTT). ITTs are also referred to as "the race of truth", as winning depends only on each rider's strength and endurance, and not on help provided by teammates and others riding ahead and creating a slipstream. Individual time trials are usually held on flat or rolling terrain, although sometimes they are held up a mountain road (in Italian: cronoscalata "chrono climbing"). Sometimes the opening stage of a stage race is a very short individual time trial called a prologue (8 km or less for men, 4 km or less for women and juniors).

Starting times are at equal intervals, usually one or two minutes apart. The starting sequence is usually based on the finishing times in preceding races (or preceding stages in the case of a multi-stage race) with the highest ranked cyclist starting last. Starting later gives the racer the advantage of knowing what time they need to beat (and also makes the event more interesting to spectators). Competitors are not permitted to draft (ride in the slipstream) behind each other. Any help between riders is forbidden. The rider with the fastest time is declared the winner.

== Professional ==
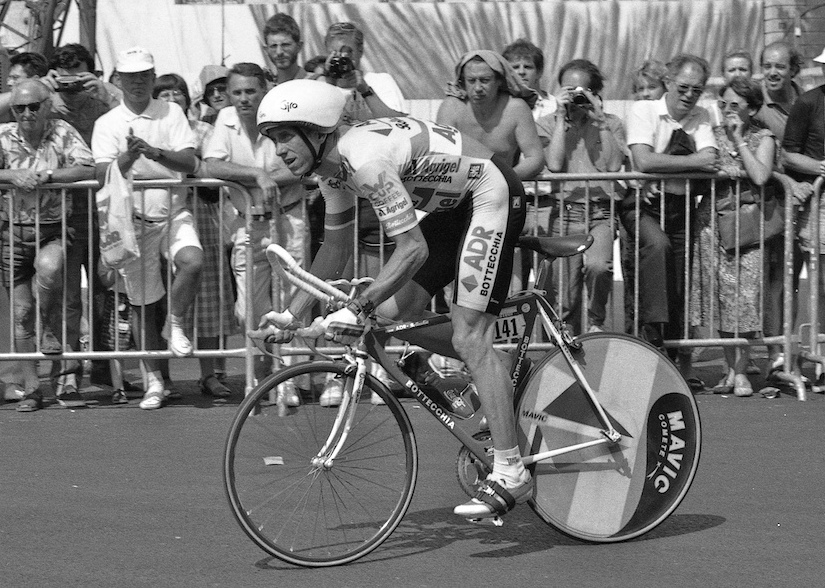
Greg LeMond holding low-profile 'bullhorn' handlebars, with tri-bars in between his arms, at the 1989 Tour de France

Bicycle construction is limited by regulations covering dimensions and other features such as weight. UCI Regulations At the professional level, time trials (TTs) are frequently accompanied by motorcycles, some carrying video equipment or race officials, and riders may be followed by a team car carrying coaches and spare parts, but the cyclists are not permitted to draft behind the vehicles. Race regulations typically dictate a minimum distance behind the cyclist which the car must maintain and a minimum gap that must exist between two cyclists before the car may enter that gap.

Individual time trials are often used as stages in stage races such as the Grand Tours; these vary from short prologue time trials over no more than eight kilometres (designed to create an attacking racing style earlier in the race) to longer distance events over flat or rolling courses, to timed ascents of mountain roads (mountain time trial). In the 1989 edition of the Tour de France, eventual winner Greg LeMond made up a 50-second deficit to runner-up Laurent Fignon over 24.5 km during the individual time trial on the final stage to win the race by 8 seconds, the smallest margin ever. The Vuelta a España often features a final individual time trial in Madrid in which the winner is often decided, providing much drama and excitement at the end of the stage race. In recent years, Óscar Sevilla and Roberto Heras have seen their lead evaporate in the time trial in Madrid.

The Grand Prix des Nations was a semi-Classic event; professionals may also compete in the annual World time trial championship. The individual time trial is also an Olympic event in which professionals are allowed to participate.

Many of the top stage racers have also been top performers in the individual time trial, such as Lance Armstrong, Eddy Merckx, Alfredo Binda, Jacques Anquetil, Bernard Hinault, Fausto Coppi, Laurent Fignon, Greg LeMond, Miguel Indurain, Jan Ullrich, Ivan Basso, Alberto Contador, Cadel Evans, Fabian Cancellara, Tom Dumoulin, Bradley Wiggins and Tadej Pogačar. Most recent winners of the Tour de France have been good time-trialists; exceptions include Marco Pantani, Carlos Sastre, and Andy Schleck, who were climbing specialists.

== Performance and tactics ==
To do well in an ITT, cyclists must

- maintain a steady power output for long periods
- maintain a controlled heart rate for long periods
- have a smooth, regular pedalling technique
- position themselves to be extremely aerodynamic
- discipline themselves to operate just below the anaerobic threshold until near the end of the course

Beginners are often criticized for putting in a J profile effort, meaning that they often go out too hard in the beginning, compensate by reducing their efforts in the middle, and then realize towards the end that they have not put out enough effort during the race. As a result, the time trial is often considered the most difficult part of any major competition for young cyclists.

== Time trial equipment ==
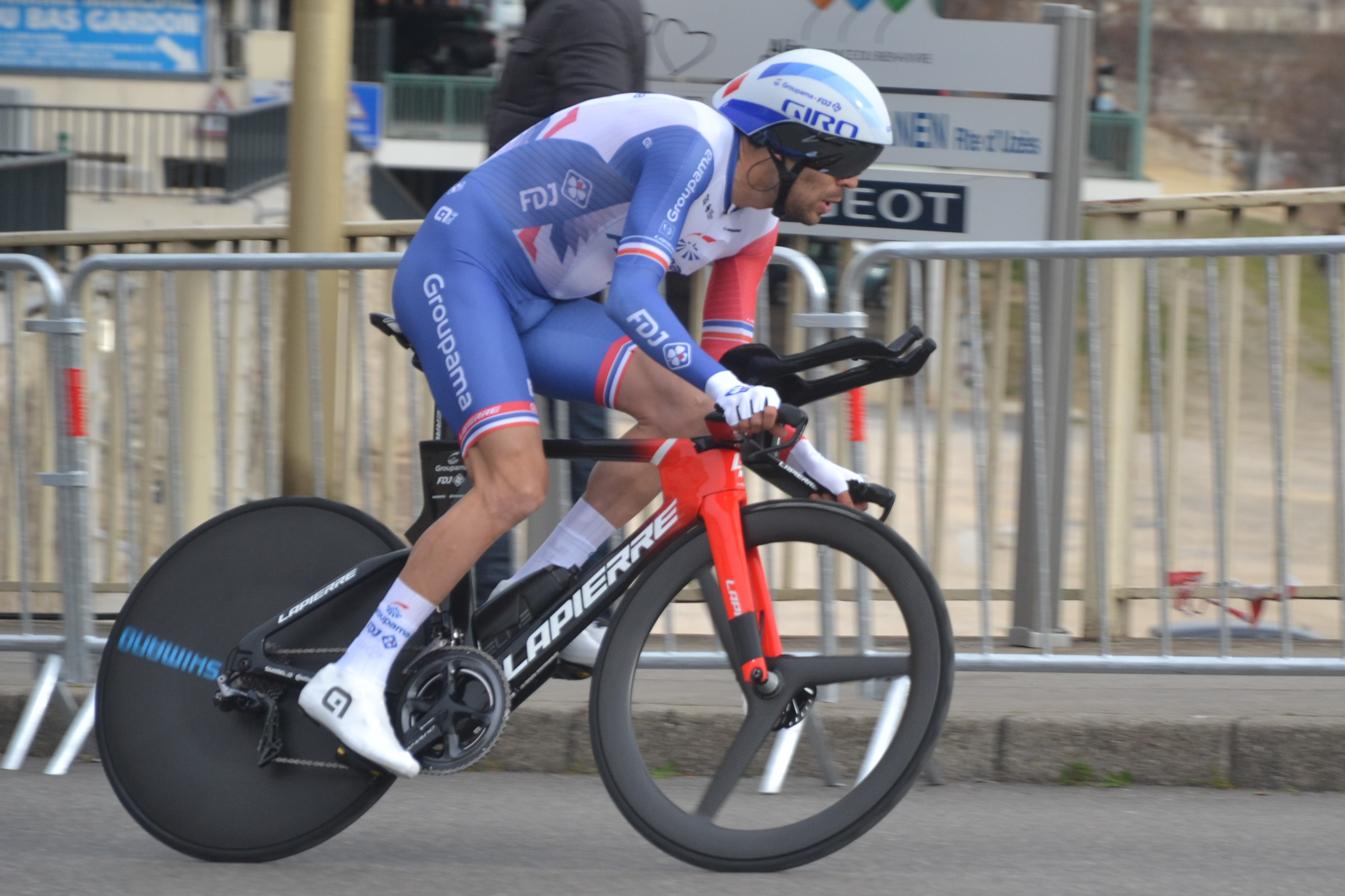
Thibaut Pinot at the 2022 Étoile de Bessèges, riding a time trial bicycle with aerodynamic wheels with disc brakes and aero bars

Special aerodynamic time trial bicycles, clothing, helmets, aerobars and other equipment are often used in ITT events. Generally, components are designed to be as aerodynamic as possible, as most of the rider's effort goes into overcoming aerodynamic drag. The rider's position makes the greatest difference, and most use the now-standard tuck position, using tribars to allow the rider to position their arms inline with the wind and allow their back to sit as low and flat as possible, reducing frontal area and improving air flow around the body. TT bikes often have lower handlebars than normal road racing bikes to facilitate this. Also, the saddle is sometimes moved forwards relative to the handlebars and bottom bracket to allow the hips a more natural angle of motion, improving performance (for UCI-sanctioned events, the saddle must be a certain distance behind a vertical line drawn through the center of the bottom bracket).

Up until the late 1980s, low-profile 'bullhorn' handlebars were used, and normal drop handlebars before them. Then in the late 1980s triathletes developed so-called tri-bars that allowed for a much better aerodynamic position. They were first brought into the time trialling public eye in the 1989 Tour de France when Greg LeMond overcame a 50-second deficit in the final day's time trial to win the Tour by 8 seconds from Frenchman Laurent Fignon. Fignon was using conventional handlebars, Lemond the new triathlon style. The concept has changed little since then, with only Scotsman Graeme Obree attempting to improve the idea. His arms-under-the-torso tuck was revolutionary, helping him and others to break world records and win World Championships. The UCI banned it in 1994, but he came back with the 'Superman' position, an evolution of the traditional tri position, but with the arms fully stretched out in front. This was also banned, and there are now strict rules governing the dimensions of handlebars, which can make life difficult for taller riders who fall outside the defined parameters and must adapt their positions to fit the rules.

Equipment used is very specialized, and component manufacturers can spend vast sums of time and money on wind tunnel testing to ensure their product is faster than the competition's. Deep section or solid disc wheels are often used to reduce turbulence around the spokes, but these can affect handling in windy conditions. In the UK the front wheel must have a minimum of 45% open area when viewed from the side, for safety reasons. UCI events still permit the use of disc wheels for the front, but it is very unusual. Many components are modified for aerodynamic efficiency, and manufacturers are now developing more integrated systems, such as brakes built into the fork or frame so as not to disturb the airflow.

Clothing is also different for time trialing. One-piece skinsuits that do not flap in the wind are common; tight lycra shoe covers help improve airflow over buckles and straps; long pointed helmets channel air down the riders back (the position of the helmet above the rider's back is crucial, it must be as close to the body as possible; too high and the air will just flow underneath the helmet. This is often hard to achieve as the rider moves his head due to the suffering endured during a hard race).

== Fastest Grand Tours time trials ==
Fastest Stage (including Prologues)

- Rik Verbrugghe, 58.874 km/h, 7.6 km prologue time trial 2001 Giro d'Italia.

Fastest Non-Prologue Stage (including Stages of up to 20 km)

- Filippo Ganna, 58.831 km/h, 15.1 km Stage 1 time trial, Giro D'Italia, 3 October 2020.

Fastest Stage (including only Stages of up to 20 km)

- Rubén Plaza, 56.218 km/h, 38.9 km Stage 20 time trial, Vuelta a España, 17 September 2005.

Fastest Stage (including only Stages of up to 40 km)

- Abraham Olano, 52.003 km/h, 46.4 km Stage 6 time trial, Vuelta a España, 10 September 1999.

Fastest Stage of Tour de France

- Rohan Dennis, 55.446 km/h, 13.8 km Stage 1 time trial, Utrecht, 4 July 2015.

Fastest Prologue Stage of Tour de France

- Chris Boardman 55.267 km/h Lille - Euralille (7.2 km) 1994

Fastest Prologue Stage of Vuelta a España

- Fabian Cancellara 54.000 km/h Assen (4.8 km) 2009

Fastest Tour de France Time Trial longer of up to 20 km

- Greg LeMond 54.545 km/h Versailles - Paris (24.5 km) 1989

Fastest Tour de France Time Trial longer of up to 40 km

- David Millar 54.361 km/h Pornic - Nantes (49 km) 2003

Fastest Vuelta a España Time Trial longer than 20 km

- Samuel Sánchez 54.095 km/h Collado Villalba (20 km) 2007

Fastest Non-Prologue Stage of Giro d'Italia

- Filippo Ganna, 58.831 km/h, 15.1 km Stage 1 time trial, Giro D'Italia, 3 October 2020.

== See also ==
- Time trialist
- Team time trial
- UCI Road World Championships – Men's time trial
- UCI Road World Championships – Women's time trial
