= Lockring =

Threaded washer used to prevent components from becoming loose during rotation

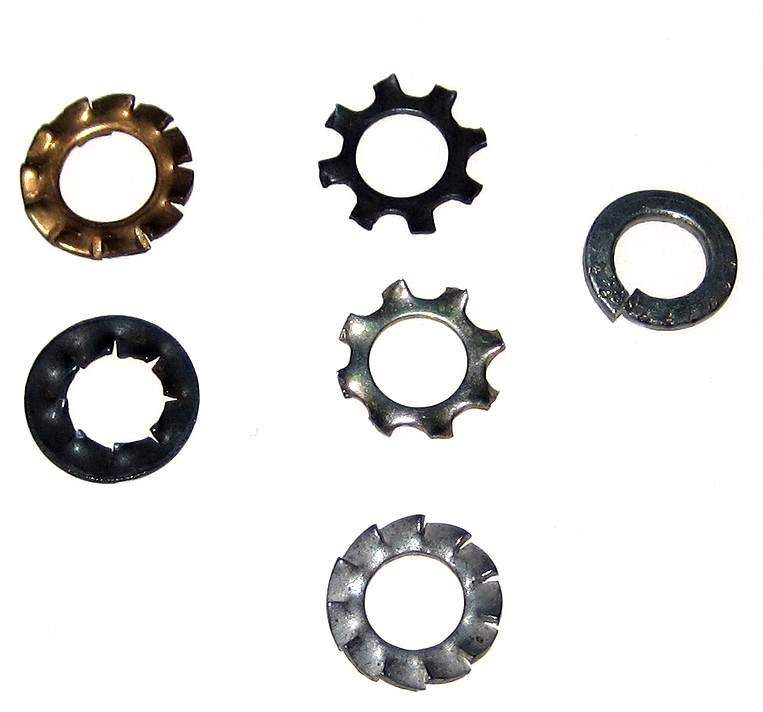
Locking washers, size M4

A lock ring is a threaded washer used to prevent components from becoming loose during rotation. They are found on an adjustable bottom bracket and a track hub of a bicycle.

== See also ==
- Agitator (device)
- List of bicycle parts
- Ratchet (device)
- Tine (structural)
