= Campagnolo =

Italian manufacturer of bicycle components

Campagnolo, Corp.
- Type: Privately held company
- Industry: Cycling components
- Founded: 1933; 93 years ago in Vicenza, Italy
- Founder: Tullio Campagnolo
- Headquarters: Vicenza, Italy
- Area served: Worldwide
- Key people: Valentino Campagnolo (Tullio's son)
- Products: Bicycle related components
- Number of employees: approx. 180
- Subsidiaries: Fulcrum Wheels
- Website: campagnolo.com

Campagnolo is an Italian manufacturer of high-end bicycle components with headquarters in Vicenza, Italy. The components are organised as groupsets (gruppi), and are a near-complete collection of a bicycle's mechanical parts. Campagnolo's flagship components are the Super Record, Record, and Chorus groupsets with all three representing their recent shift to 12-speed drivetrains. Super Record and Record are the top groupsets, followed by Chorus, Potenza, Centaur and Veloce. Campagnolo also produces aluminum and carbon wheels, as well as other components (like carbon fiber seat posts, and bottle-cages).

== History ==
Founded by Tullio Campagnolo, the company began in 1933 in a Vicenza workshop. The founder was a racing cyclist in Italy in the 1920s who conceived several ideas while racing, such as the quick release mechanism for bicycle wheels, derailleurs, and the rod gear for gear changing. Campagnolo has been awarded more than 135 patents for innovations in cycling technology.

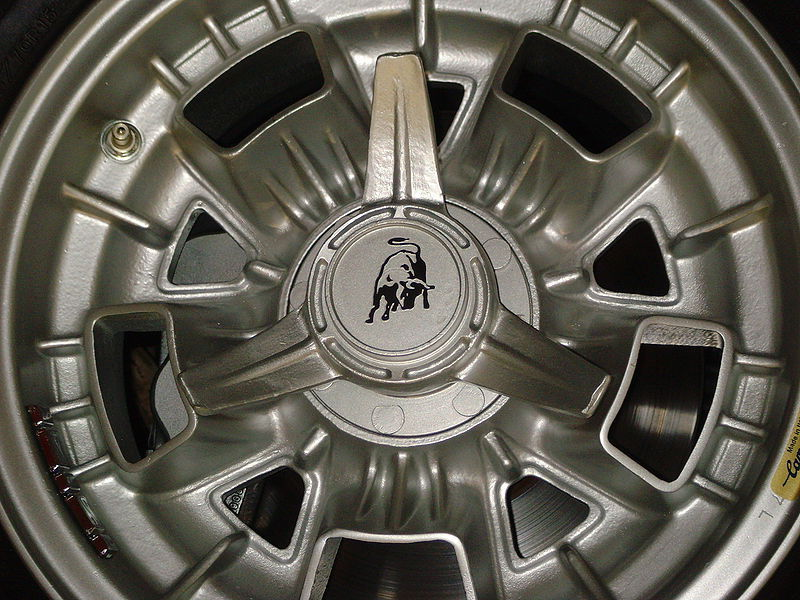
Magnesium wheel of the Lamborghini Espada made by Campagnolo

At the end of the 1950s, Campagnolo started to manufacture magnesium parts such as wheels for sports cars like Alfa Romeo, Ferrari, Lamborghini, and Maserati and built chassis for NASA satellites in 1969. In 1963, Campagnolo produced a disc brake for the Innocenti Lambretta TV motorscooter - the first two-wheel production vehicle with such a brake. In the 1970s they also supplied wheels for Ferrari's Formula One cars.

Campagnolo worked with the manufacturer Colnago and racer Eddy Merckx and produced lightweight parts for the bike he used to beat the world hour record in 1972. Merckx used Campagnolo exclusively and was a friend of Tullio Campagnolo.

Following Campagnolo's success during the 1970s and '80s, innovation lagged as rival SunTour developed indexed shifting, Shimano combined shifter/brake levers (Shimano Total Integration), and FSA introduced compact chainsets. An unsuccessful foray into mountain biking, the overbuilt and heavy Euclid, Centaur and Olympus groupsets contributed to the company's decline during those years. By the time the expensive Record O.R. (off-road) and Icarus MTB groupsets made it to the market, Campagnolo's reputation was firmly cemented as a road bike brand. As a result, Campagnolo pulled out of the Mountain Bike market in 1994. Despite its struggles, Campagnolo introduced its ErgoPower combined shifter/brake levers and renewed its focus on high-end road cycling components.

The late 1990s and early 2000s saw Campagnolo's increased use of carbon fibre and titanium parts in groupsets and the development of wheelsets. In 2004, Campagnolo introduced a complete Compact drivetrain with smaller chainrings, to give lower gears than traditional drivetrains. Other innovations included a Hirth-joint engineered Ultra-Torque external-bearing crankset and G3 spoke lacing for racing wheels. In 2008, Campagnolo introduced 11-speed drivetrains with Super Record, Record, and Chorus groupsets. Campagnolo has released an electronic version of its drivetrain. In April 2018 Campagnolo launched 12-speed Record and Super Record groupsets, and in 2020, the company launched Campagnolo Ekar, a 13-speed groupset aimed at gravel riders.

Campagnolo has focused on road cycling and track cycling. The teams it sponsored for multiple years in the UCI ProTour were Lotto–Soudal, AG2R Citroën Team, UAE Team Emirates and Cofidis, but Lotto-Soudal moved to Shimano for 2022, UAE and Cofidis made the same jump a year later, and in 2024 AG2R jumped across to Shimano leaving Campagnolo unrepresented in ProTeams. However, in 2025 Cofidis switched back to Campagnolo, with the partnership continuing through 2026

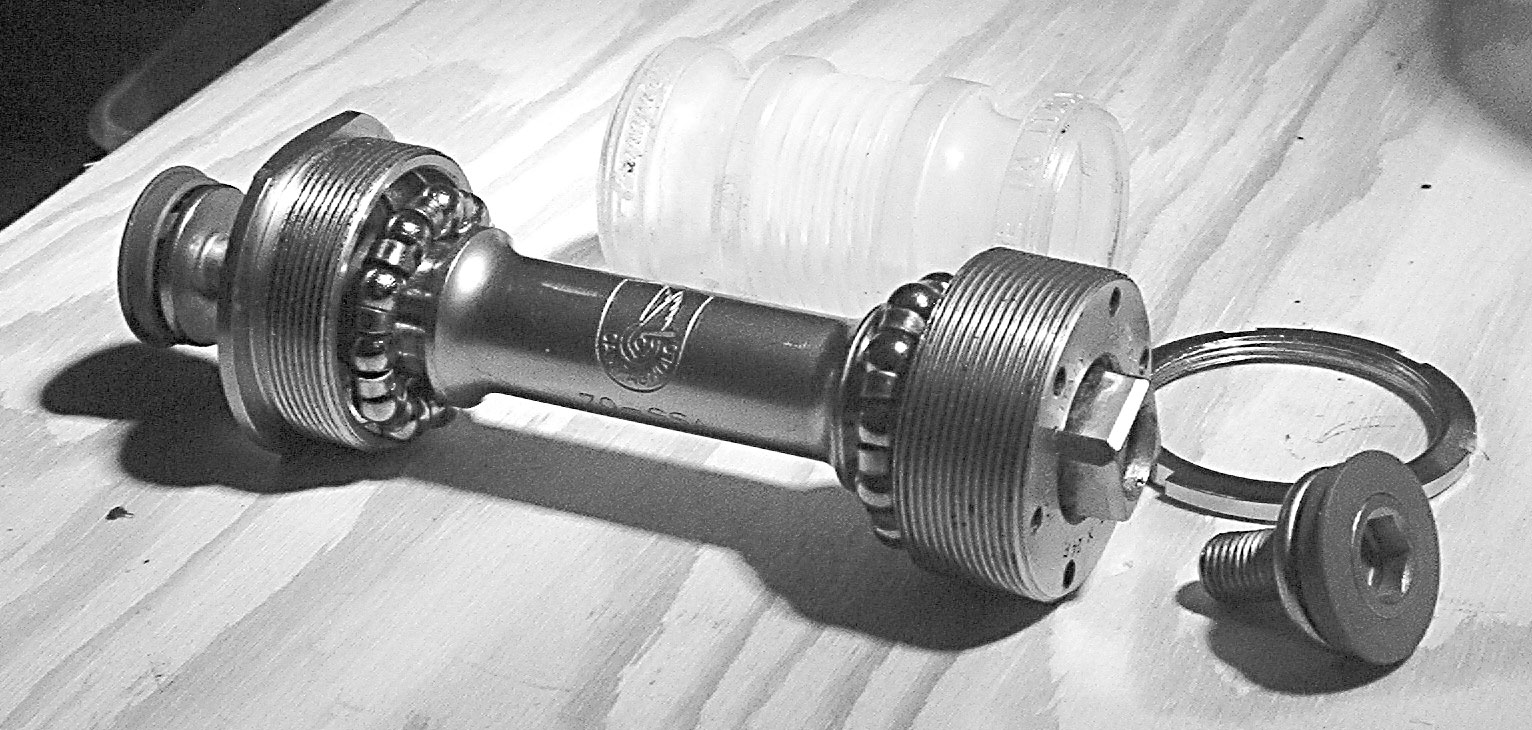
Campagnolo bottom bracket from the 1980s

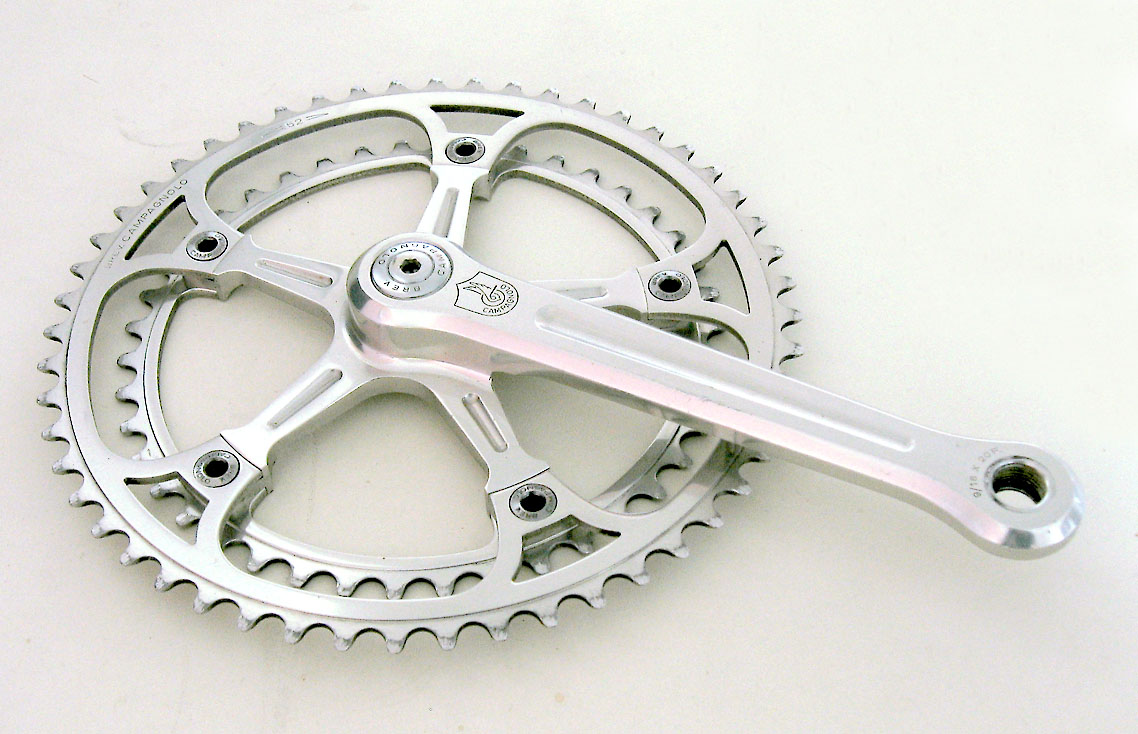
Campagnolo Super Record Crankset from 1981

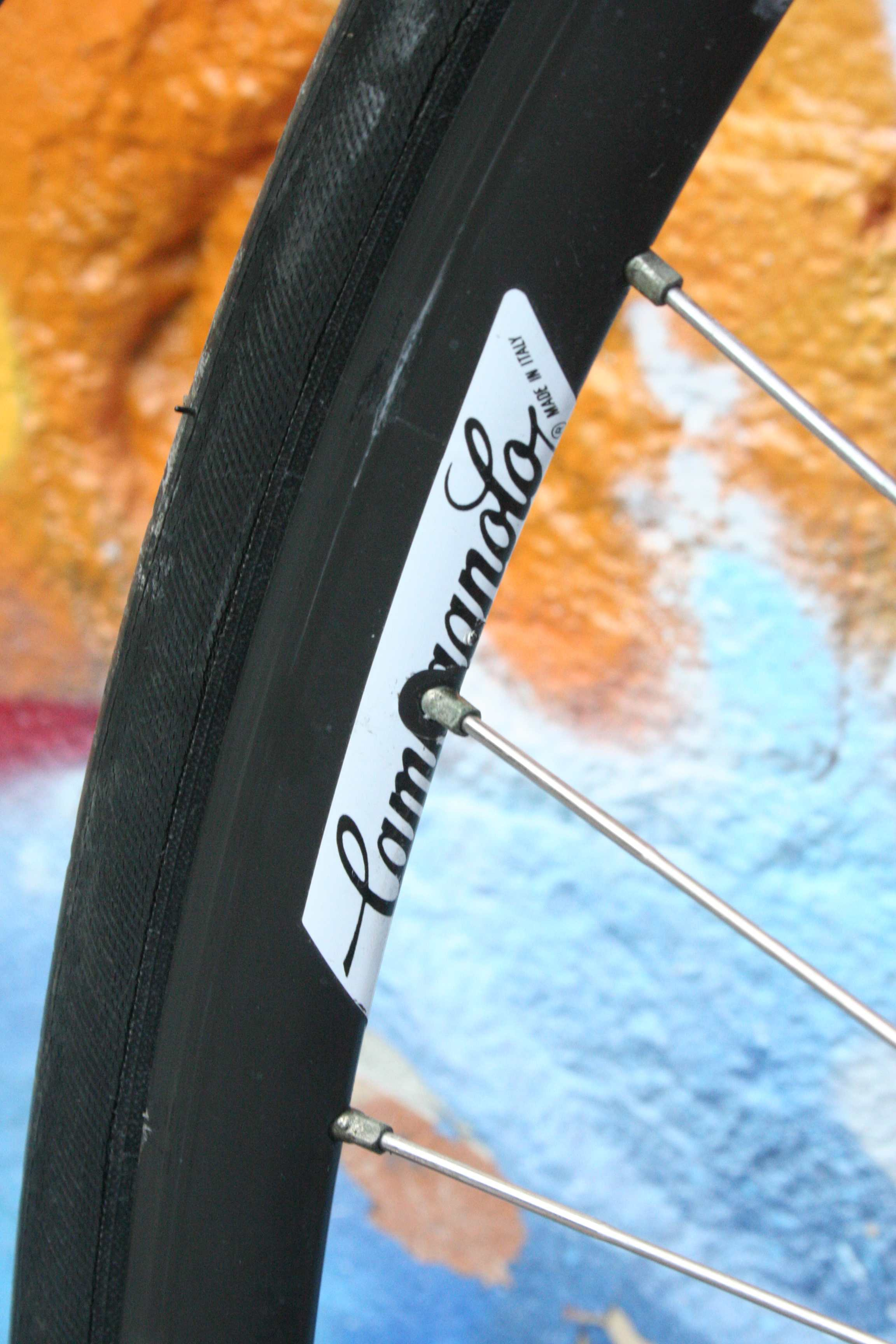
Campagnolo OMEGA rim

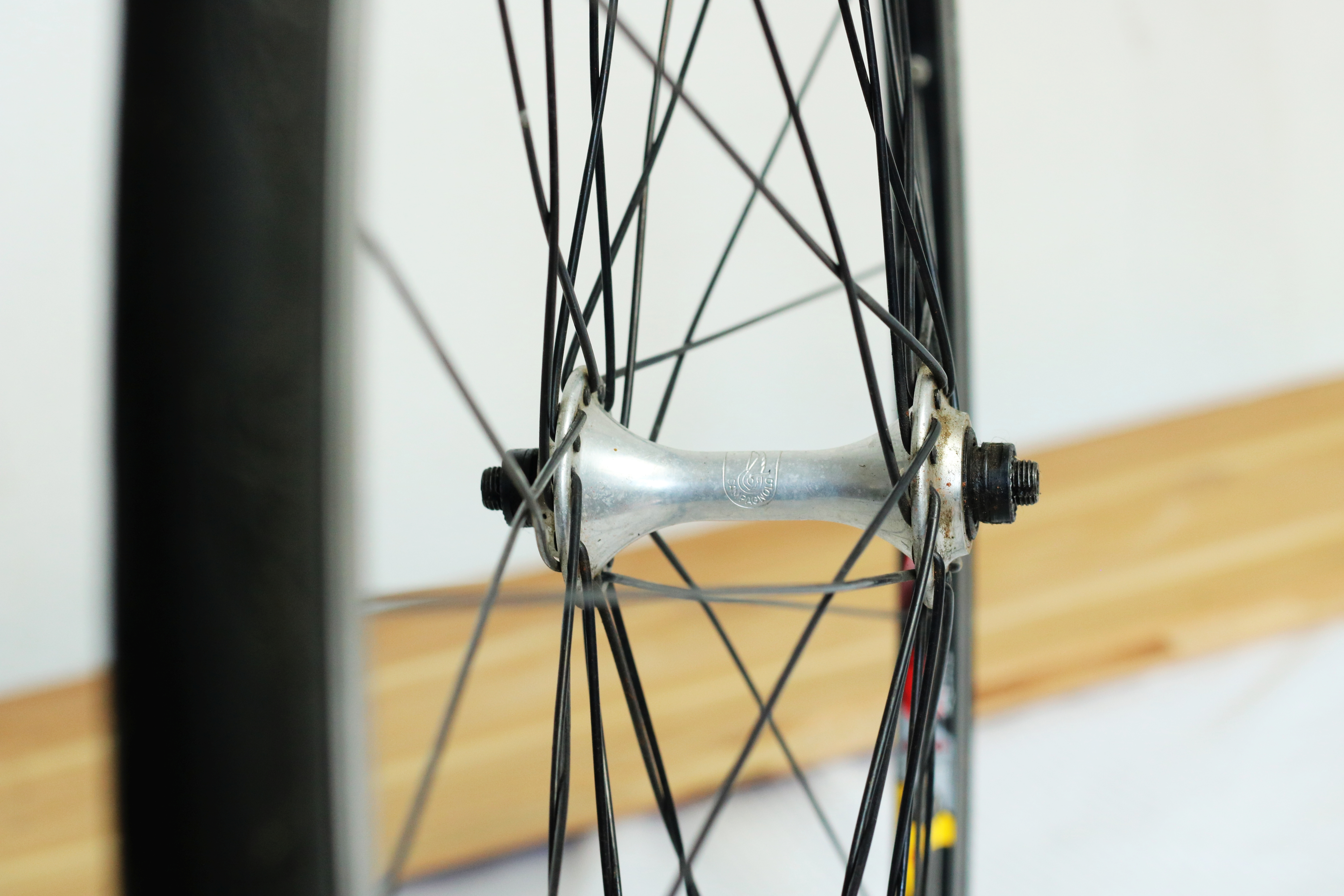
Campagnolo front hub

== Timeline (bicycle parts) ==
1901 Tullio Campagnolo is born on 26 August in the eastern suburbs of Vicenza, Italy

1922 Tullio Campagnolo begins his racing career

1930 Campagnolo patents the quick-release hub

1933 After fabricating parts in the backroom of his father's hardware store, Tullio starts Campagnolo SPA with production of the quick-release hub

1940 Tullio hires his first full-time employee

The derailleur enters production, enabling gears to change without removing the wheel - the pieces are still handmade

1949 Campagnolo introduces a parallelogram rear derailleur, the Gran Sport

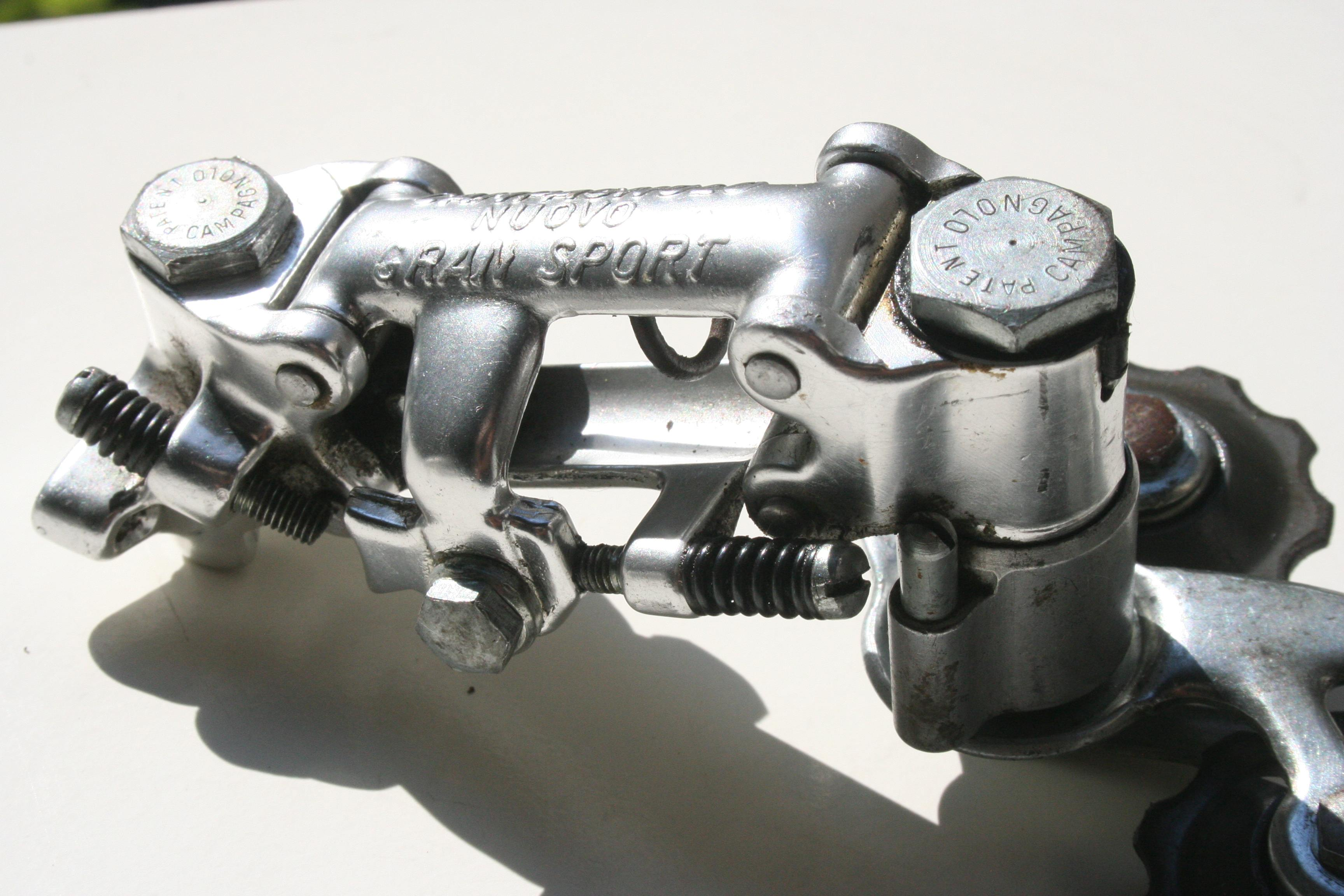
Gran Sport rear derailleur

1956 Campagnolo introduces a parallelogram front derailleur

1963 The Record rear derailleur (chromed bronze) is introduced

1966 The Nuovo Record rear derailleur is introduced

Eddy Merckx uses it for his first four Tour de France victories

1973 The Super Record Road and Track groups are introduced Learn more about the Super Record Road group.;

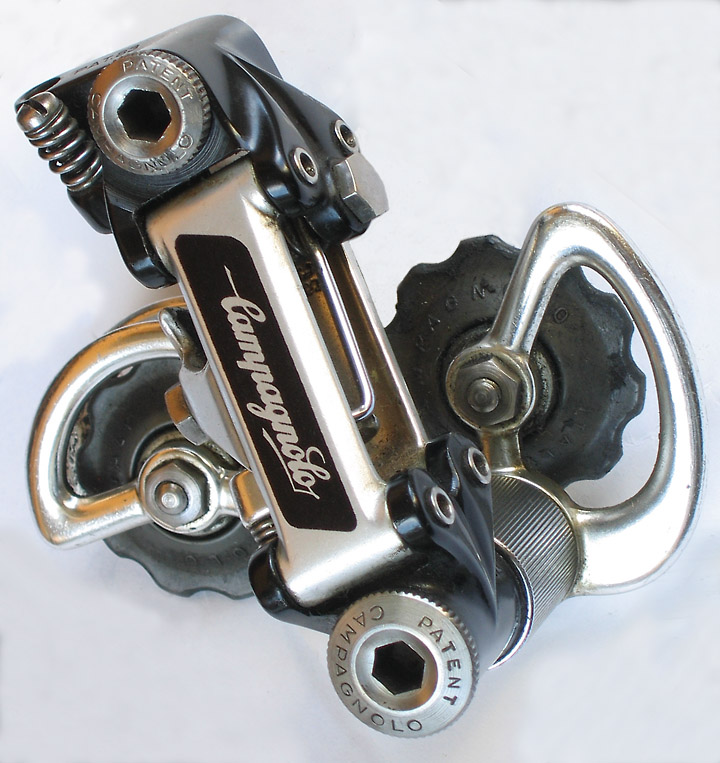
Campagnolo Super Record 1983 rear derailleur

1983 Tullio Campagnolo dies on 3 February

Anniversary groupset to mark 50 years of Campagnolo bicycle parts

1985 Campagnolo creates Delta brakes, with a parallelogram linkage to actuate the calipers

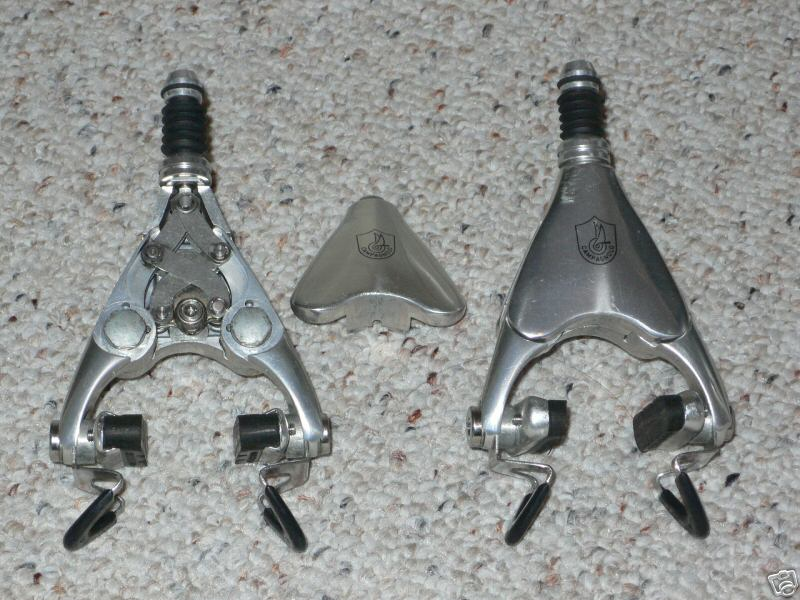
Iconic Campagnolo Delta brake calipers from the 1980s

1986 The re-designed Record road and track groupsets (also known as C-Record) are introduced, replacing Super Record as the top of range

1987 The last year of Super Record until 2008

1989 Campagnolo introduces a mountain bike groupset, though heavier and less advanced than those by Shimano and SunTour

1991 8-speed shifting components are introduced

1992 The ErgoPower levers are introduced, which combines brake lever and a shift lever to answer Shimano's STI levers

1993 Delta brakes are discontinued

1994 Campagnolo leaves the mountain bike components business

1995 Group names on components are introduced

1997 9-speed shifting components are introduced

1998 Next generation Ergo Levers

1999 Record Carbon Ergo levers, Daytona group, and for the Record, Chorus and Daytona groups new hubs (much lighter than the old ones, axles made of aluminum alloy) are introduced

2000 10-speed shifting is introduced

The ErgoBrain cyclocomputer compatible with the Ergo shifters displays cadence, gear, and the normal functions of a cyclocomputer

2001 Carbon-fiber shifting levers for Record group

2002 Former Daytona group is renamed "Centaur"

2004 Carbon-fiber cranks for Record and Chorus groups

2005 10-speed Centaur and Chorus shift and brake levers are introduced for flat bar road bikes

Fulcrum Wheels, a company owned by Campagnolo, produces wheelsets compatible with Campagnolo and Shimano cassettes

2006 Hollow external bearing crankset is announced

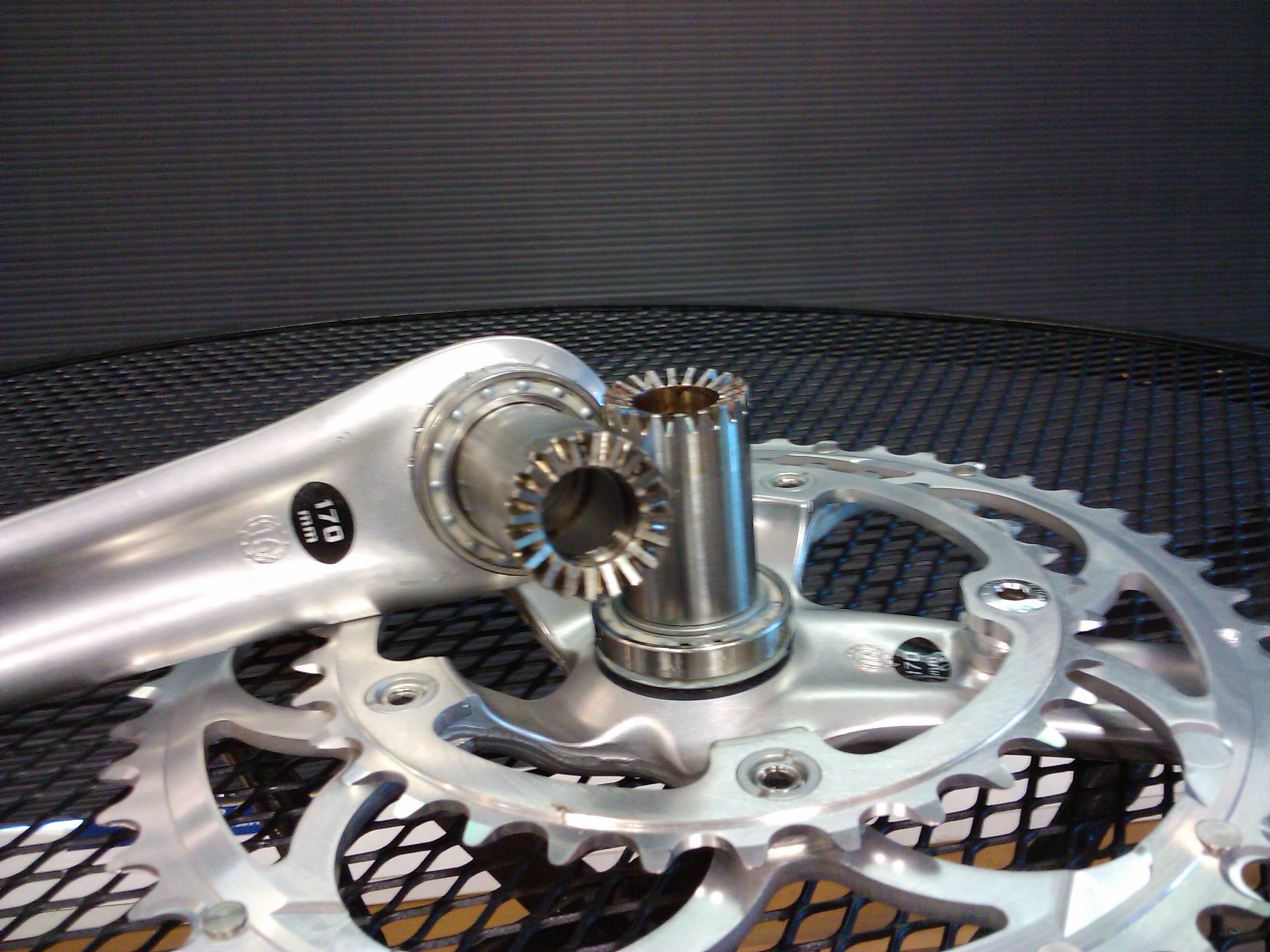
Ultra-Torque crankset with Hirth joint

2007 10-speed Mirage and Xenon component groups and new Ultra-Torque components are introduced

Record hubs are now black, 20 g lighter and no longer have grease ports

2008 11-speed Record, Super Record, and Chorus groups are introduced

2009 Re-introduction of Athena as an 11-speed component group below Chorus in product line

2010 Bora One wheels are introduced

2011 First electric 11-speed Super Record group was used at the Tour de France by Team Movistar

2012 Bora Ultra 80mm wheels are introduced

2013 80th anniversary groupset made

2014 Super Record RS groupset introduced following input from professional team riders

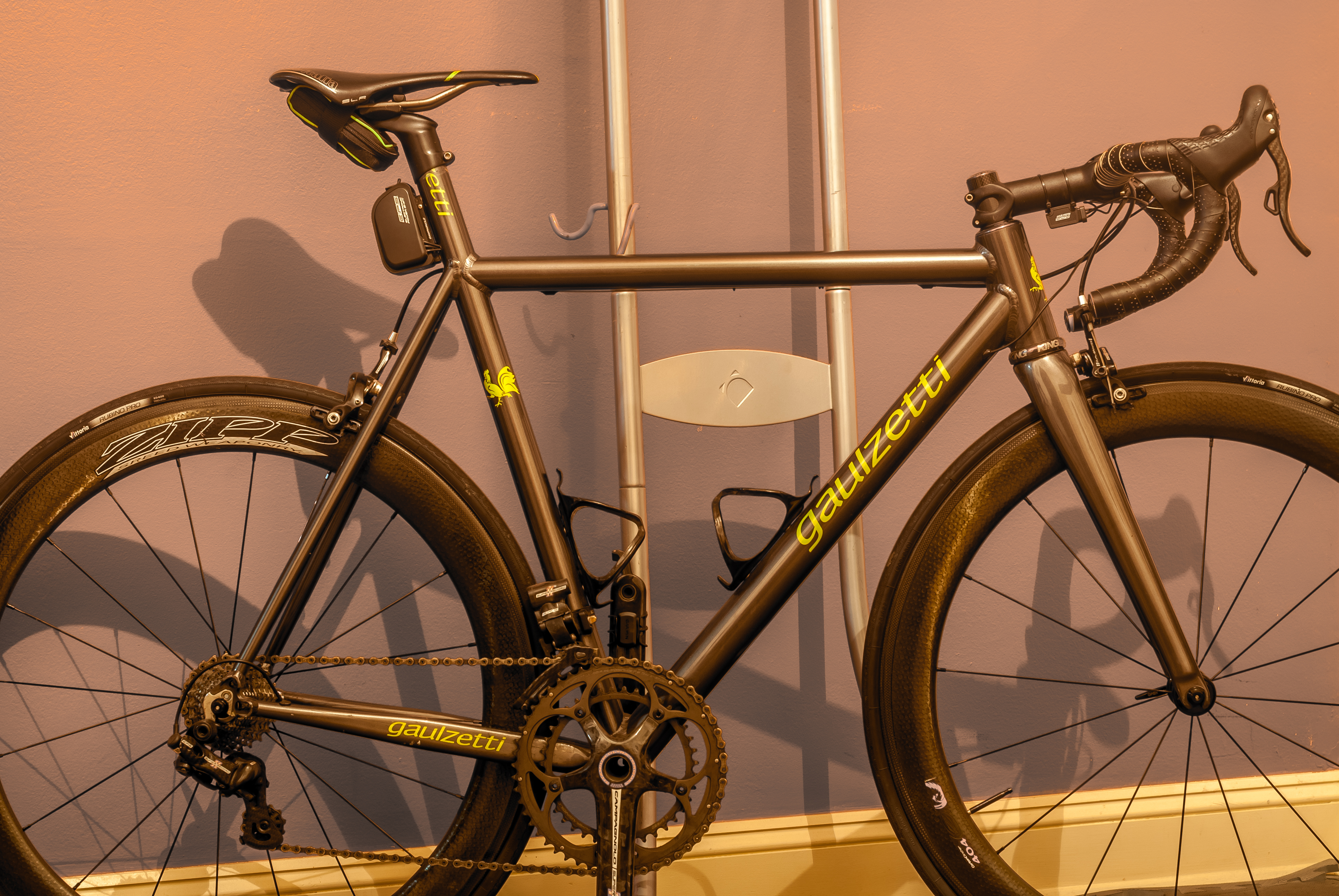
Road bike equipped with first generation Campagnolo Super Record EPS

2015 Athena EPS discontinued and Chorus EPS introduced

Chorus, Record and Super Record groupsets are overhauled with a 4 arm, 8 bolt chainset introduced

Bora 50 and 35 wheels become available in Clincher and adopt a wider rim profile

2015 Potenza group is introduced

2017 Centaur group reintroduced as Campagnolo's least expensive 11-speed group

2018 12-speed Super Record and Record mechanical groups are introduced.(for disc and rim brake)

Bora WTO (Wind Tunnel Optimized) wheels are introduced

2019 12-speed Super Record EPS, and mechanical 12-speed Chorus groups are introduced. Chorus will have an 11-34 cassette option and a 96/123 mm BCD with sub-compact 48/32 gearing available

2020 13-speed Ekar group are introduced

2021 Bora Ultra WTO (only for disc brake) wheels are introduced

2023 Super Record wireless groupset is introduced

2025 Record groupset is retired

13-speed Super Record groupset is introduced

13-speed Super Record 13x all road and gravel groupset is introduced

2026 13-speed Record groupset is introduced

== Trademarks ==
Campagnolo has used various trademarks, the best known is the Campagnolo signature; another is a hub quick-release lever (Tullio's most famous innovation). The logo of the company is the winged wheel.

== See also ==
- List of bicycle parts
- List of Italian companies
