= Time trial bicycle =

Racing bicycle

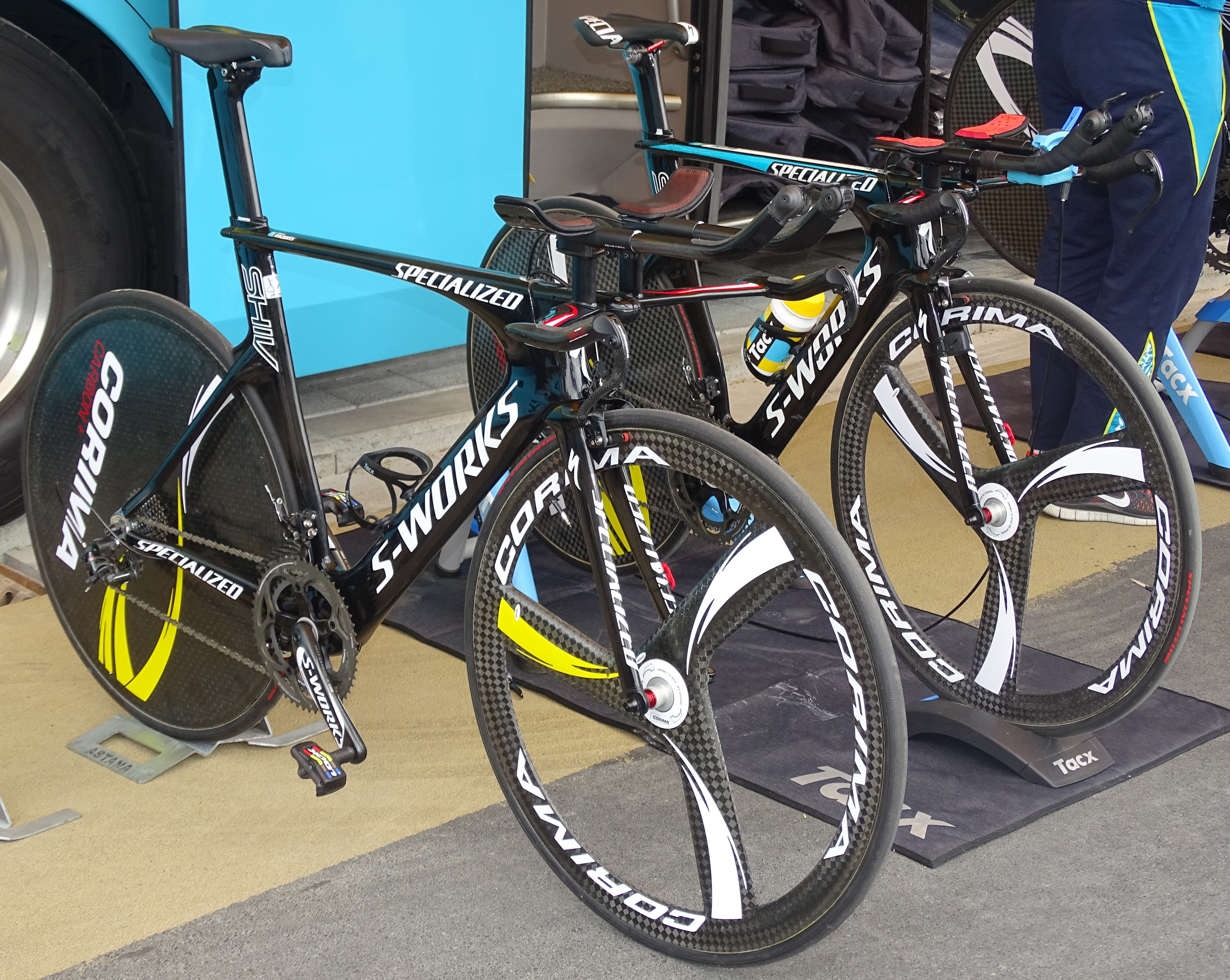
Time trial bikes used by the Astana team in 2015

A time trial bicycle is a racing bicycle designed for use in an individual race against the clock. Compared to a road bike, a time trial bike is more aerodynamic, has a shorter wheelbase, and puts the rider closer to the front of the bicycle. It may have either a solid disc or spoked wheels.

Since the cyclist in a time trial is not permitted to draft (ride in the slipstream) behind other cyclists, reducing the drag of the bicycle and rider is critical.

Time trial bicycles are similar to triathlon bicycles. Triathlon bicycles have a steeper seat tube angle, which pushes the hips forward and saves the hamstrings for the run. TT bicycles have to follow International Cycling Union (UCI) rules. UCI requires that the saddle nose of the TT bicycle must be 5 cm from the centre of the bottom bracket.

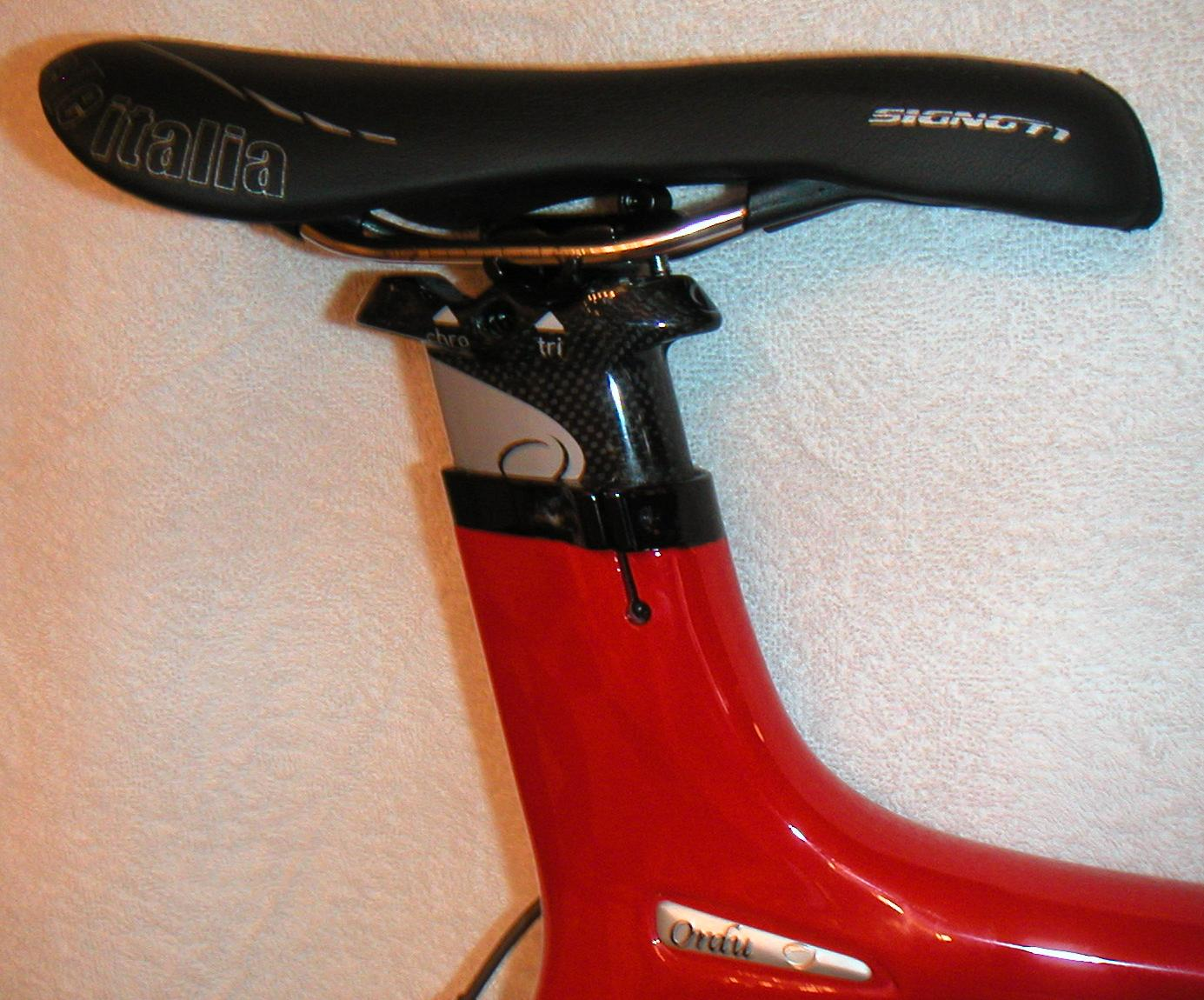
An aero seatpost on an Orbea Ordu with positions marked "chro" and "tri"

== See also ==
- Outline of cycling, overview of and topical guide to cycling
- Time trialist, type of cyclist who can maintain performance near threshold over long periods
- Belay glasses, prism eyeglasses that reduces the need to bend the head back to look upwards, originally developed for sport climbing
