= Campagnolo ErgoPower =

Gearshift system for bicycles

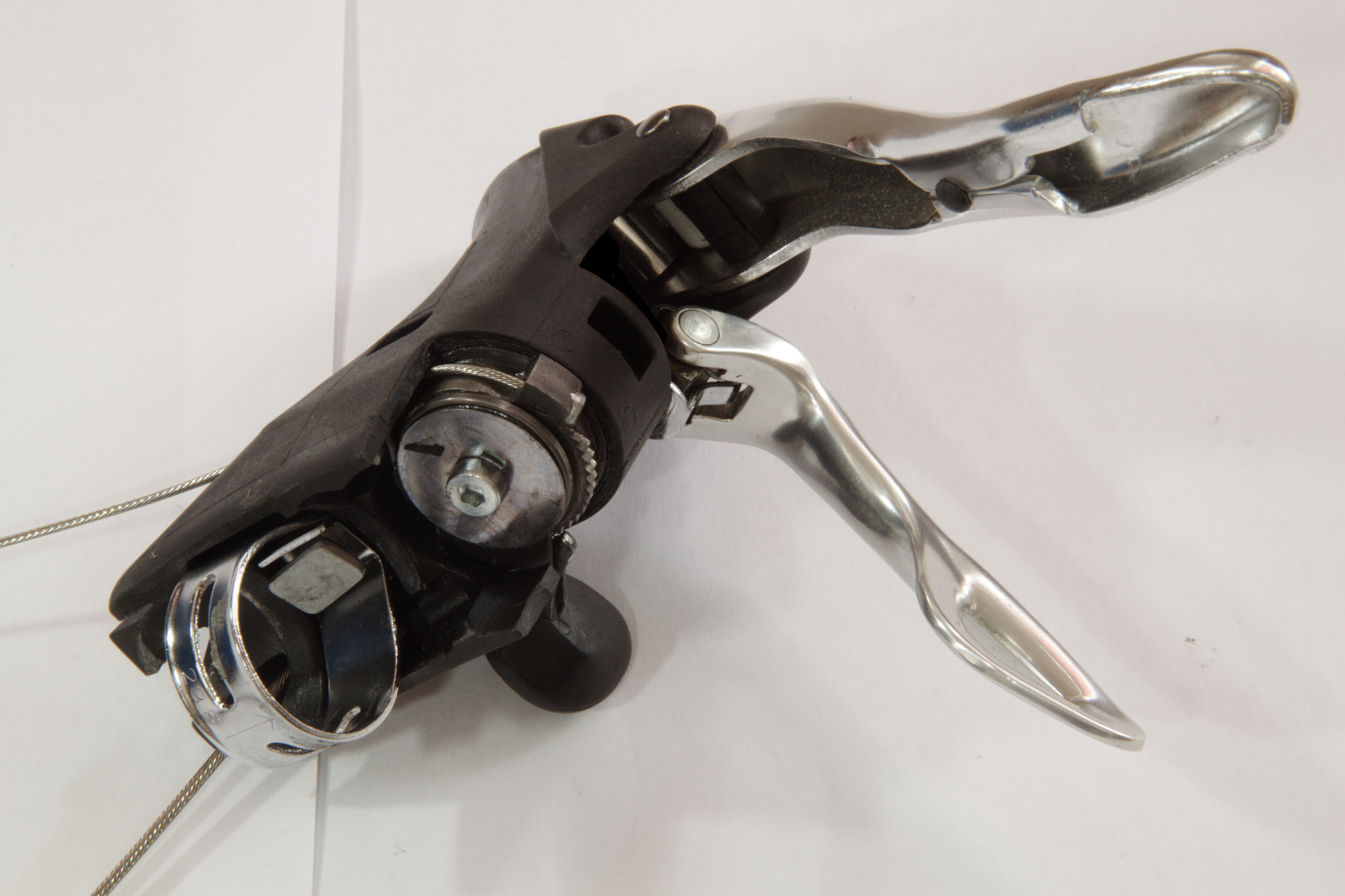
The Centaur Ergopower Shifter

Campagnolo ErgoPower is an integrated gearshift and brake lever system designed by Campagnolo for racing bicycles. It allows shifting gears without having to remove a hand from the bars, unlike previous down tube shifting systems. It was launched in 1992 to compete with Shimano Total Integration (STI). It is characterized by having three separate levers per unit: one each for braking, upshifts, and downshifts. Ergopower levers may be disassembled for servicing.

== Details ==
ErgoPower levers contain the mechanism inside the main body of the unit, rather than in the top of the brake levers as STI does, and there is no sideways action on the brake lever. Instead, the "flipper" that changes to a smaller cog on STI levers changes to a larger cog, and there is a small lever (sometimes called a 'mouse ear') on the inside of the brake hood body that shifts to a smaller cog.

== See also ==
- Shimano Total Integration
- SRAM Double Tap
