= Shimano Total Integration =

Gearshift system for bicycles

Shimano STI Dual Control shifter and brake lever: 1. Main lever; 2. Release lever; A. Pulling the main lever towards the rider applies the brake B. Pushing the main lever towards the center of the bike downshifts one, two or three gears depending on how far the lever is pushed (right hand shifter) or changes from a small chainring to a larger chainring (left hand shifter) C. Pushing the release lever towards the center of the bike upshifts one gear (right hand shifter) or changes from a large chainring to a smaller chainring (left hand shifter)

Shimano Total Integration (STI) is a gearshift system designed by Shimano for racing bicycles. It combines the braking and gear shifting controls into the same component. This allows shifting gears without having to remove a hand from the bars, unlike previous down tube shifting systems. This component is usually referred to as a "shifter" or "dual-control levers", or occasionally "brifters".

In late 1989, Shimano introduced their "Rapidfire" shifting for mountain bikes. This brought indexed shifting to the handlebars - something previously only available on downtube shifters or thumb shifters. This mechanism operates like a ratchet, the larger lever applying tension to the gear cable, the smaller one incrementally releasing it. The Rapidfire mechanism was subsequently adapted to be used in STI levers.

In 1990, Shimano introduced their STI shifting levers for road bicycles, which completely integrated the brake lever and shifter. It also redesigned the brake "hoods" where riders commonly rest their hands. This new design worked like a normal brake lever in the longitudinal plane, but also allowed the rider to shift to a larger cog by pushing the lever so that it pivots laterally. Behind the brake lever, there is a smaller lever that shifts to a smaller cog when pushed towards the inside.

This system helped Shimano take the lead in groupset manufacturing.

In 1992, the other major global producer in bicycle components, Campagnolo, collaborated with the Sachs company to produce their ErgoPower system, differing substantially in its design and operation.

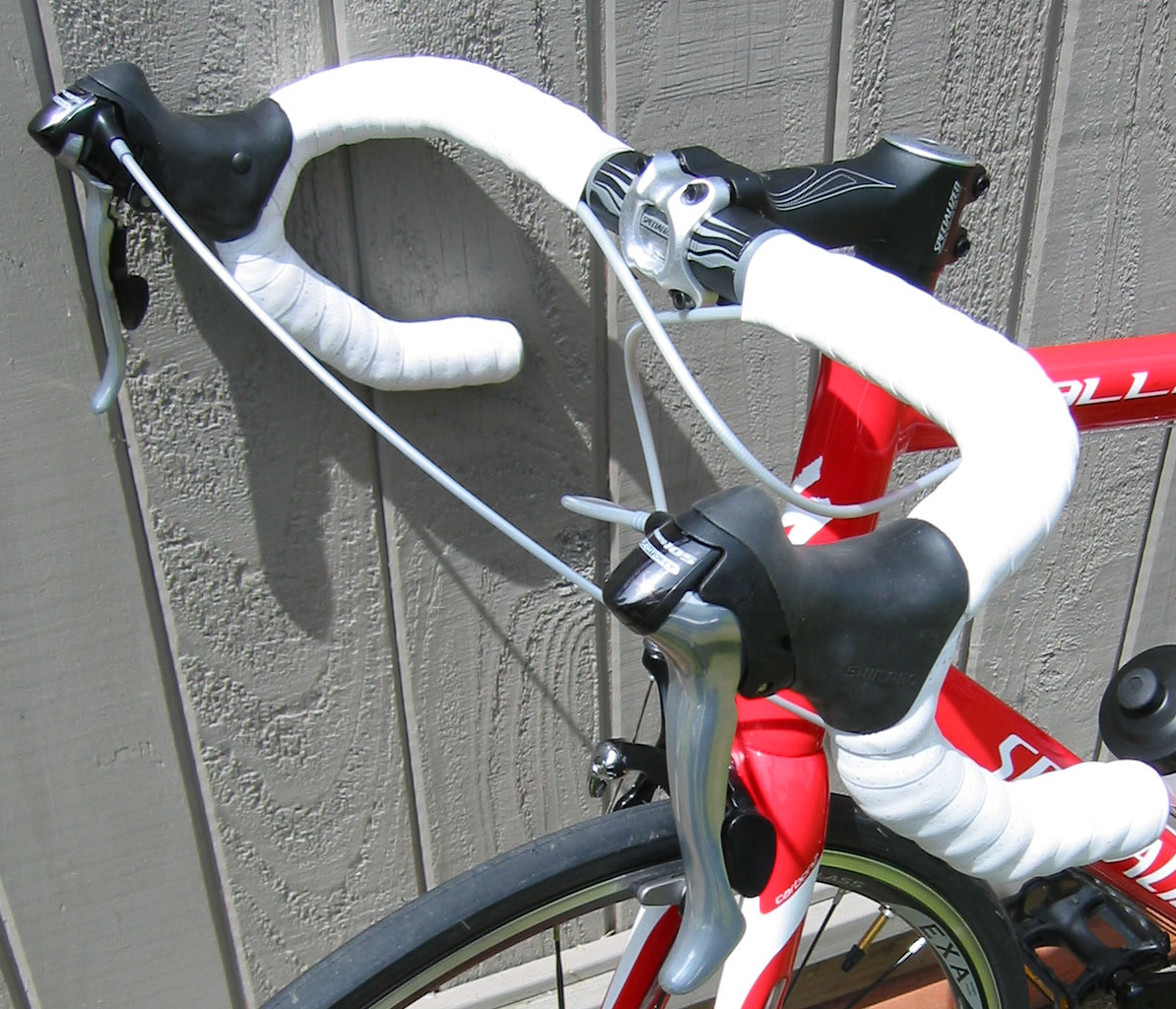
Shimano 105 9-speed STI levers

In 2003, Shimano introduced "dual-control levers" or STI for mountain bikes in their XTR groupset. Like the road shifters, XTR used the same lever for braking and shifting. This was met with some resistance as they limited the choice of disc brakes to only those made by Shimano. They are nicknamed, "flippity shifters" for the brake lever's ability to move in the vertical plane.

STI and ErgoPower have largely displaced downtube shifting, even though some cyclists still use downtube shifters for various reasons, including less expense, less weight, more flexibility, and better reliability. A compromise is to use bar-end shifters or Barcons. This type places the shifters closer to the hand positions, but still offer a simple reliable system, especially for touring cyclist. Drawbacks to STI and ErgoPower systems include the higher weight and the higher price. There are many more parts in an STI or ErgoPower lever than in a downtube system.

Since the creation of the STI shifting system the main improvements have included reducing weight and increasing cog count. Weight savings have come from using new materials such as Duralumin in Shimano's component groups and carbon fiber in Campagnolo's parts.

Some cyclists, including Lance Armstrong, installed a standard STI shifter on climbing-specific bikes for the cassette and a downtube shifter for the chainrings in order to reduce weight. This is done because the chain is shifted across the cassette much more often than the chainrings. This setup might save up to 200 grams (7.1 oz) of the total bike weight. Compared to the minimum legal racing weight permitted by the Union Cycliste Internationale, 6.8 kilograms (15 lb), 200 grams is about 3% of the total weight.

== See also ==
- Derailleur gears
- SRAM Double Tap
