= Double Tap (Ministry song) =

Song by Ministry

Single by Ministry

from the album Relapse
- Released: February 24, 2012
- Recorded: Late 2011 – February 2012
- Genre: Industrial metal, thrash metal
- Length: 4:06
- Label: 13th Planet
- Songwriters: Al Jourgensen, Sin Quirin

Ministry singles chronology
"99 Percenters" (2011)	"Double Tap" (2012)	"PermaWar" (2013)

"Double Tap" is a single by industrial metal band Ministry. It was the second single from the album Relapse, released on February 24, 2012. The song is about "Operation Geronimo". It is fast-paced, like many other Ministry songs.

== Track listing ==
1. "Double Tap" – 4:06
