= 99 Percenters =

Song by Ministry

Single by Ministry

from the album Relapse
- Released: December 23, 2011
- Recorded: September–December 2011
- Genre: Industrial metal
- Length: 3:53
- Label: 13th Planet
- Songwriters: Sam D'Ambruoso, Al Jourgensen, Tommy Victor

Ministry singles chronology
"Thunderstruck" (2010)	"99 Percenters" (2011)	"Double Tap" (2012)

"99 Percenters" is a single by industrial metal band Ministry. It is about the Occupy movement and is the first single from their 2012 album, Relapse, their first since their three-year split from November 2008 to August 2011. The band released it on iTunes on December 23, 2011, and two days later, began streaming it on their Facebook page. The working title of the song was "99%".
