= Shifter (bicycle part) =

Bicycle component

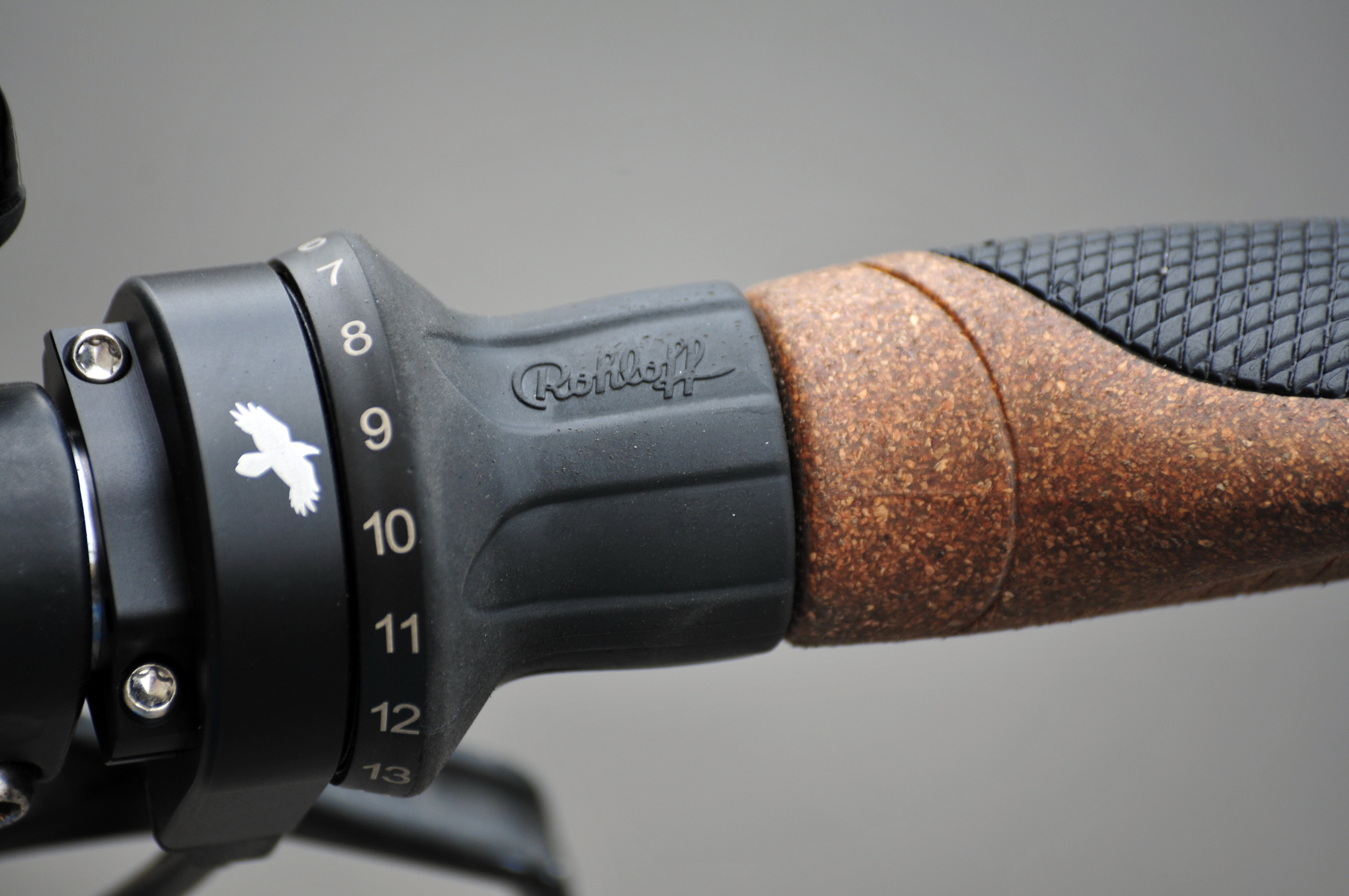
A twist-style 14-speed indexed shifter made by Rohloff

A bicycle shifter or gear control or gear levers is a component used to control the gearing mechanisms and select the desired gear ratio. Typically, they operate either a derailleur mechanism or an internal hub gear mechanism. In either case, the control is operated by moving a cable that connects the shifter to the gear mechanism.

== Location ==
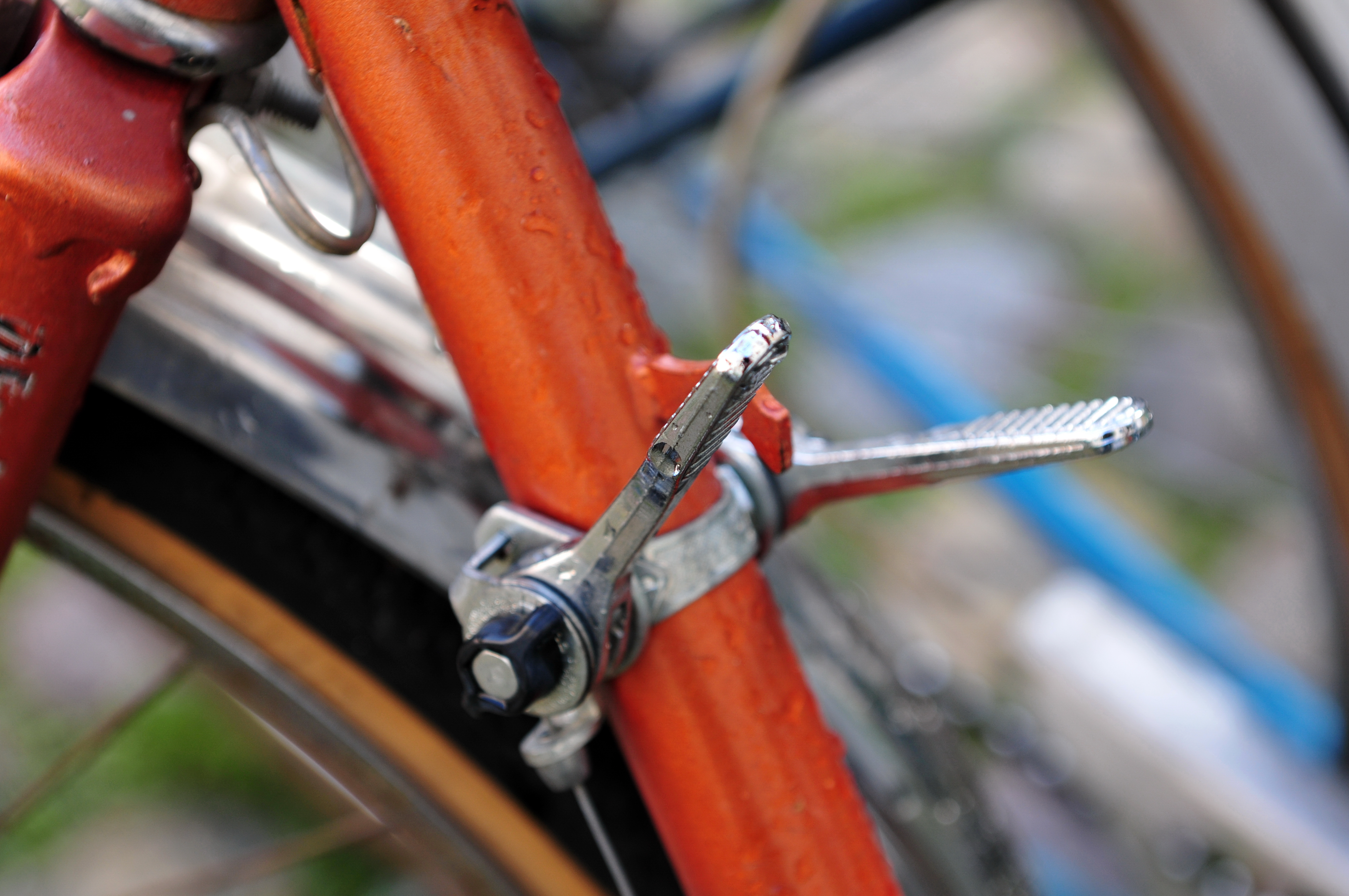
Example of downtube shifters.

Shimano SIS downtube shifter operation

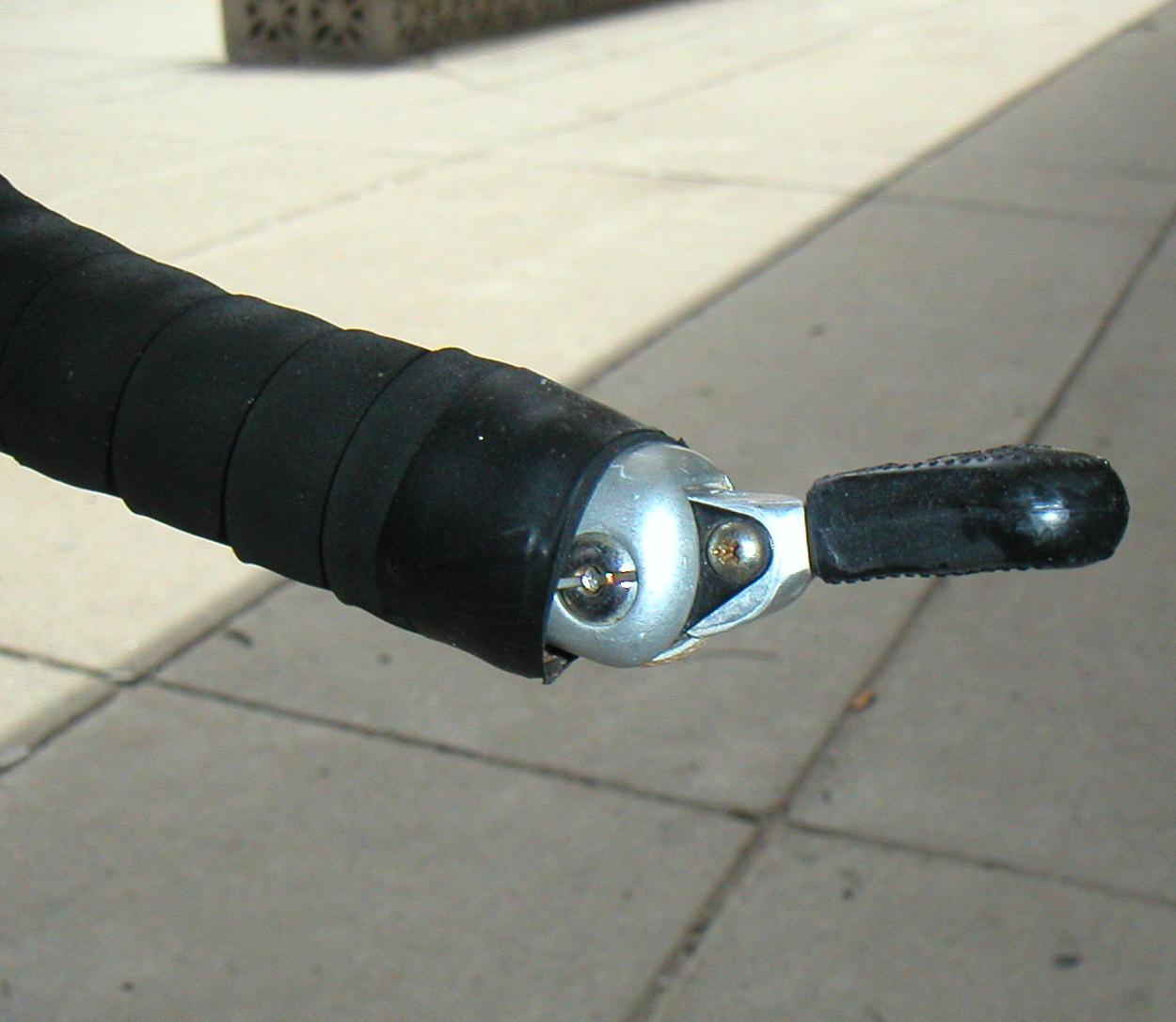
Example of a bar-end shifter

Traditionally shifters were mounted on the down tube of the frame or stem. For ergonomic reasons, they tend to be located somewhere on the handlebars on modern bicycles.

== Mechanisms ==
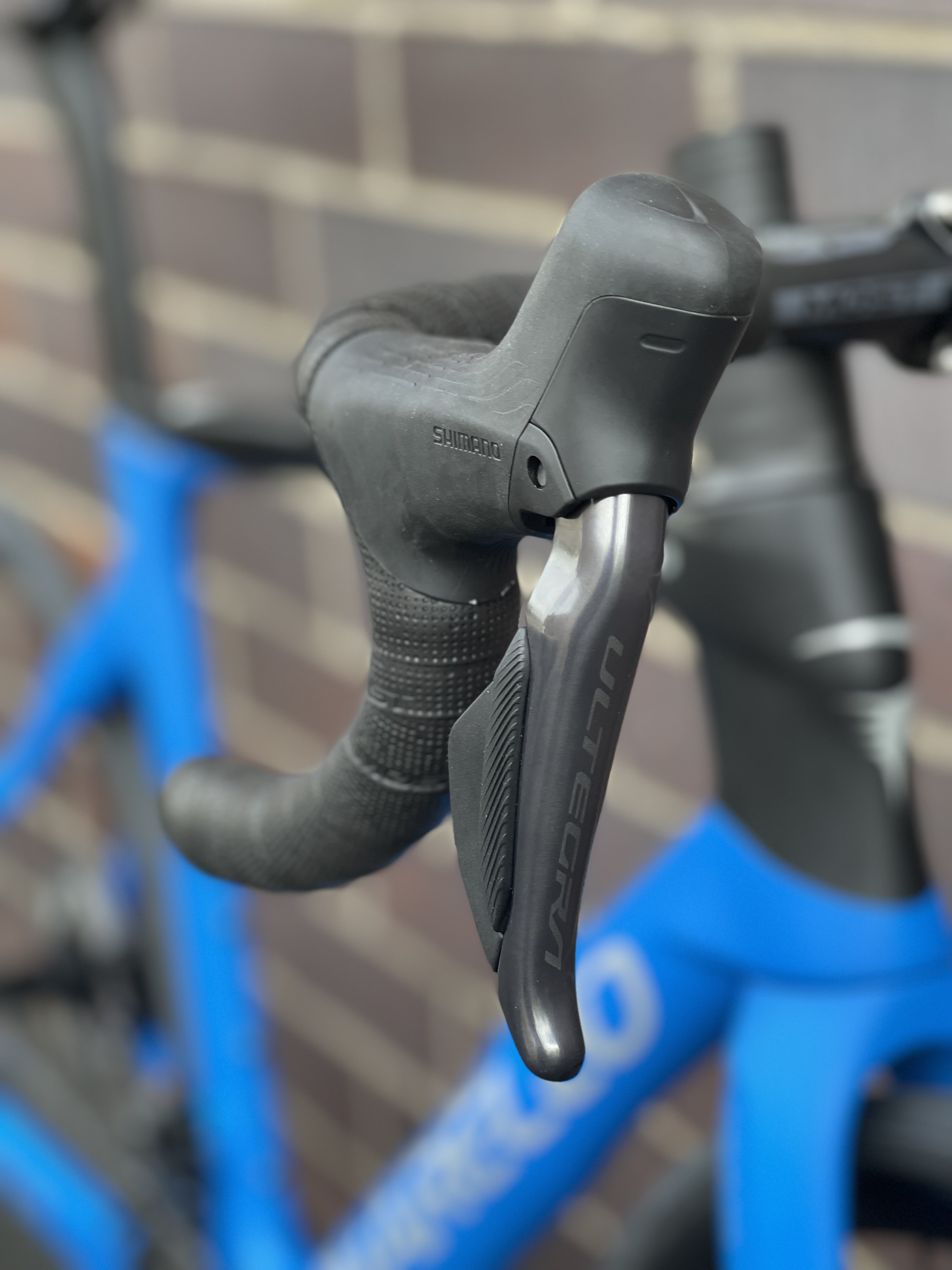
Example of road bike "brifter".

There are various types of shifter:

- Grip shifter - a wheel with click stops surrounding the handlebar is turned until the desired gear is reached, though typically one gear at a time
- Trigger shifter - a lever is pulled or pushed to change gears one at a time
- Thumb shifter - similar to a trigger shifter, but usually allows changing up to 3 gears at a time
- Road bike shifter - integrated with brake levers, sometimes known as a "brifter".

In 1990, Shimano introduced their Shimano Total Integration, STI, shifting levers for road bicycles, this was an indexed shifting system and the first to integrate shifting with the brake levers. Campagnolo soon followed with their ErgoPower system. The SRAM Double Tap was introduced in 2005.

== See also ==
- Electronic gear-shifting system
- Outline of cycling
