= SRAM Double Tap =

Gearshift system for bicycles

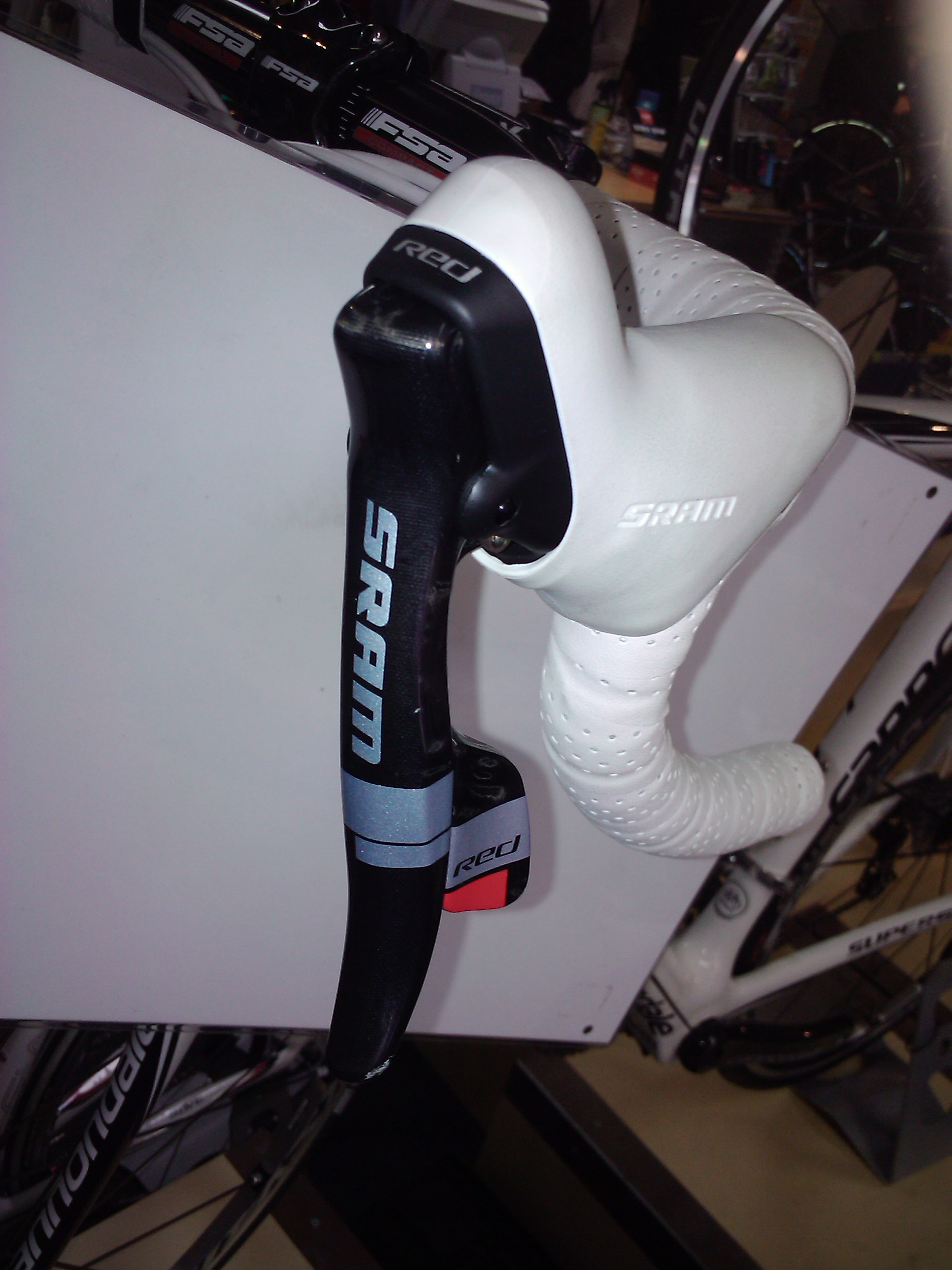
SRAM Double Tap shifter and brake lever

SRAM Double Tap is an integrated gearshift and brake lever system designed by SRAM Corporation for racing bicycles. It allows shifting gears without having to remove a hand from the bars, unlike previous down tube shifting systems. It was launched in late 2005 to compete with Shimano Total Integration and Campagnolo ErgoPower. It is characterized by having a single shift lever per unit that the rider moves inward a short distance for upshifts and a longer distance for downshifts. It is lighter and smaller than competitors because it has few parts.

In 2010 SRAM expanded the Double Tap technology from the original drop handlebars to flat handlebars on flat bar road bikes.
