= Electronic gear-shifting system =

Method of changing gears on a bicycle

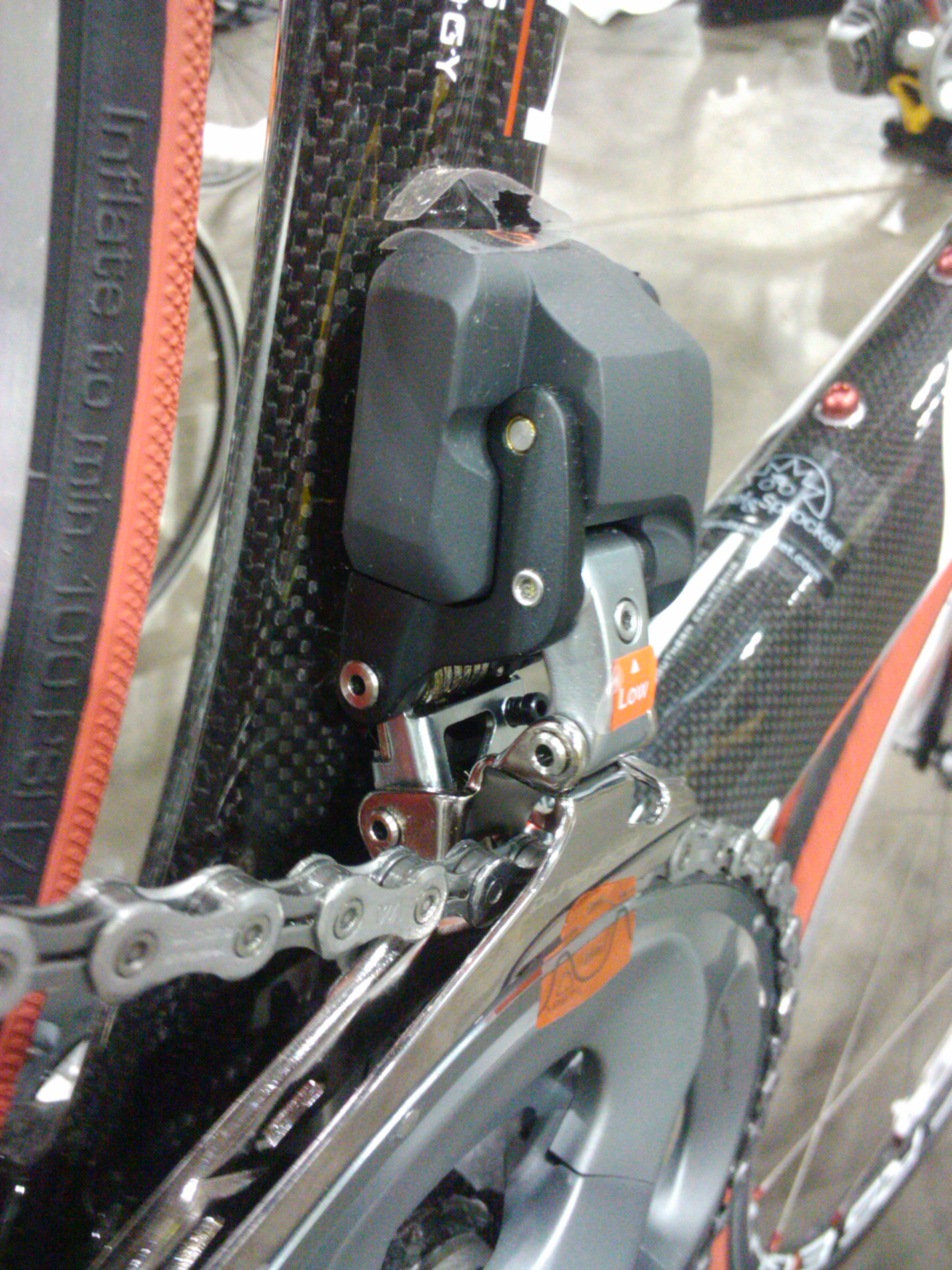
Electronic front derailleur (Shimano Di2)

An electronic gear-shifting system is a method of changing gears on a bicycle, which enables riders to shift with electronic switches instead of using conventional control levers and mechanical cables. The switches are connected by wire or Wirelessly to a battery pack and to a small electric motor that drives the derailleur, switching the chain from cog to cog. An electronic system can switch gears faster and, because the system does not use Bowden cables and can calibrate itself, it may require less maintenance.

== History ==
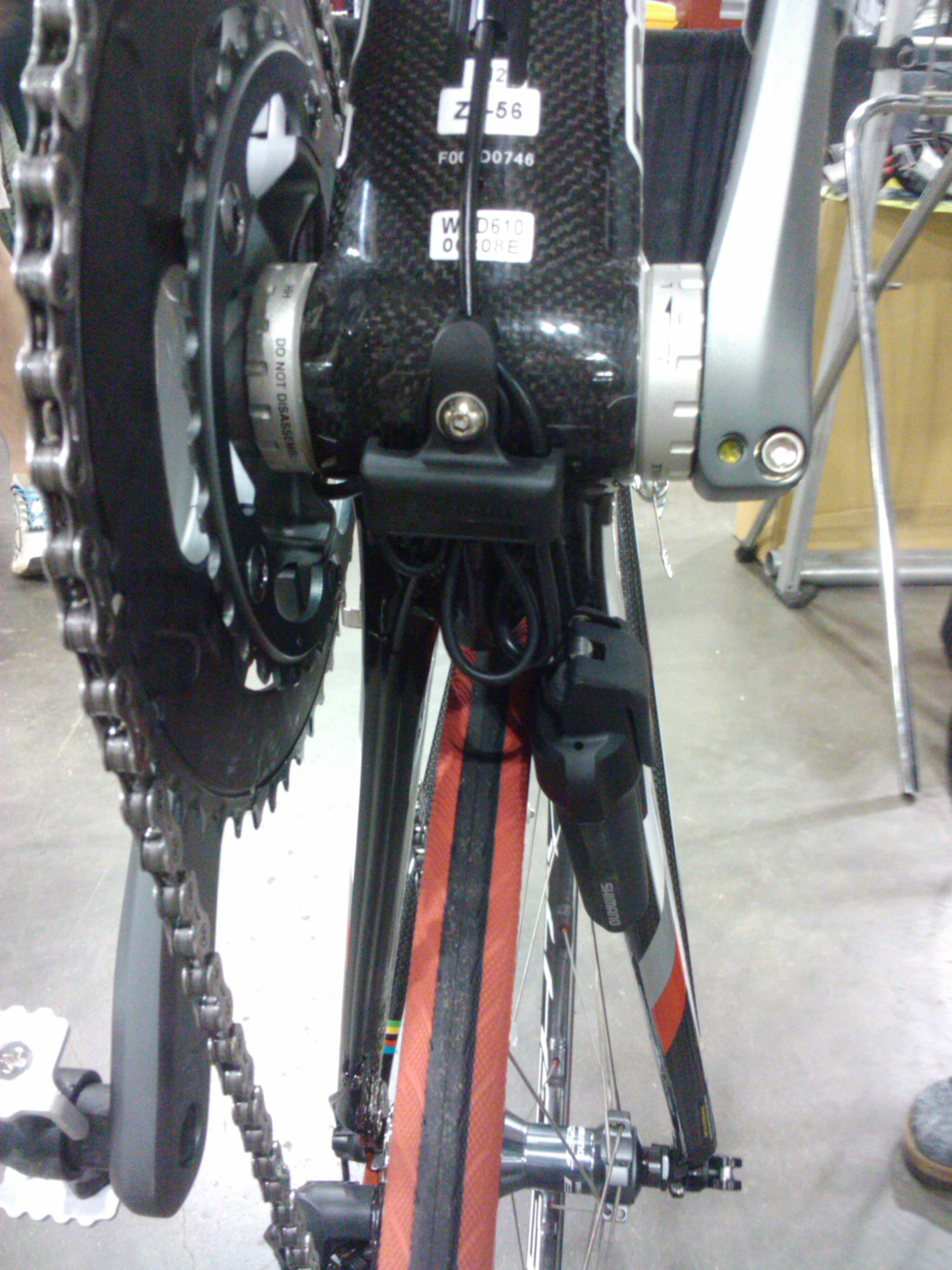
Electronic shifting control unit and battery pack mounted to the bottom of bottom bracket and left chain stay

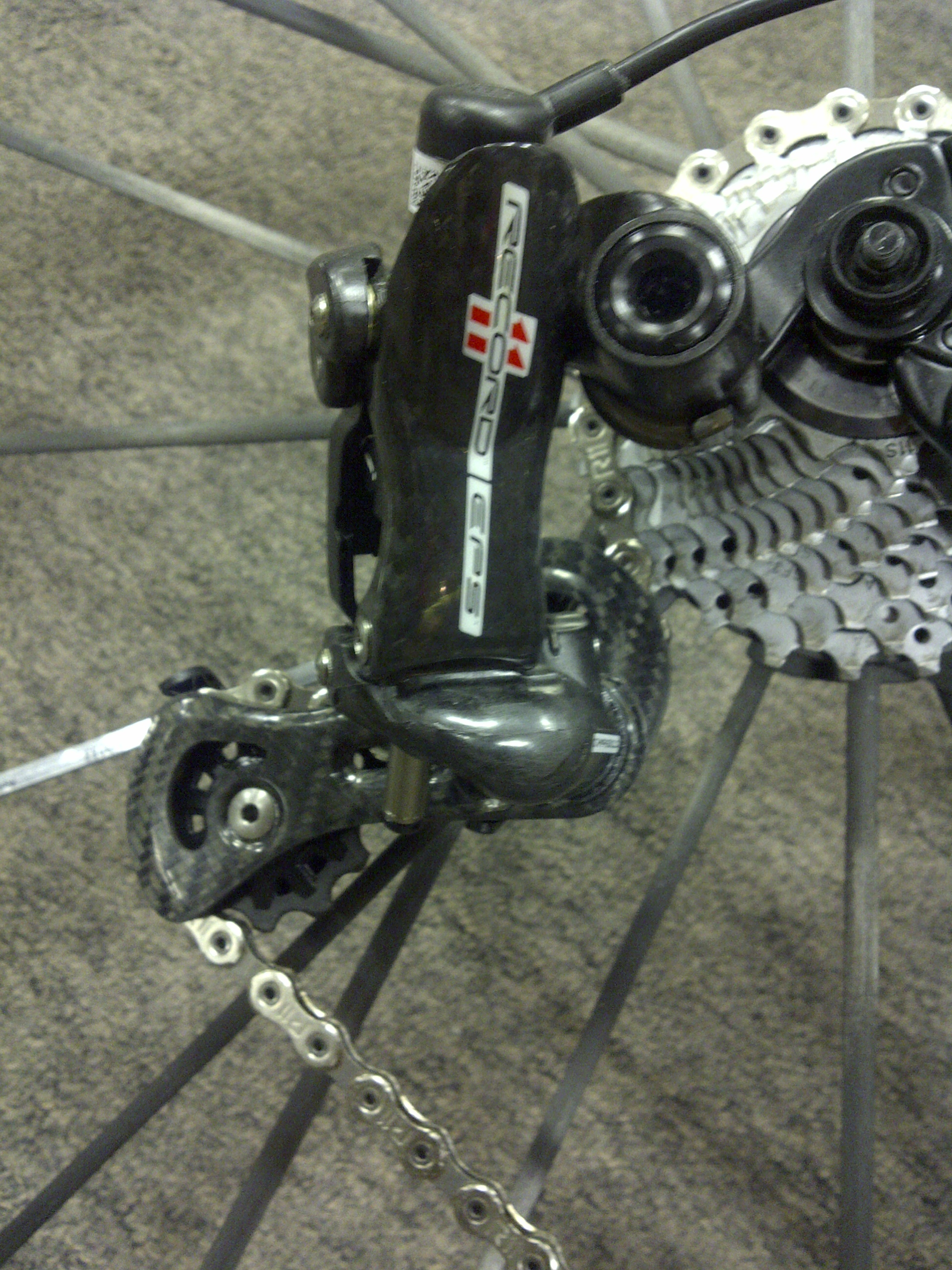
Electronic rear derailleur (Campagnolo Record EPS)

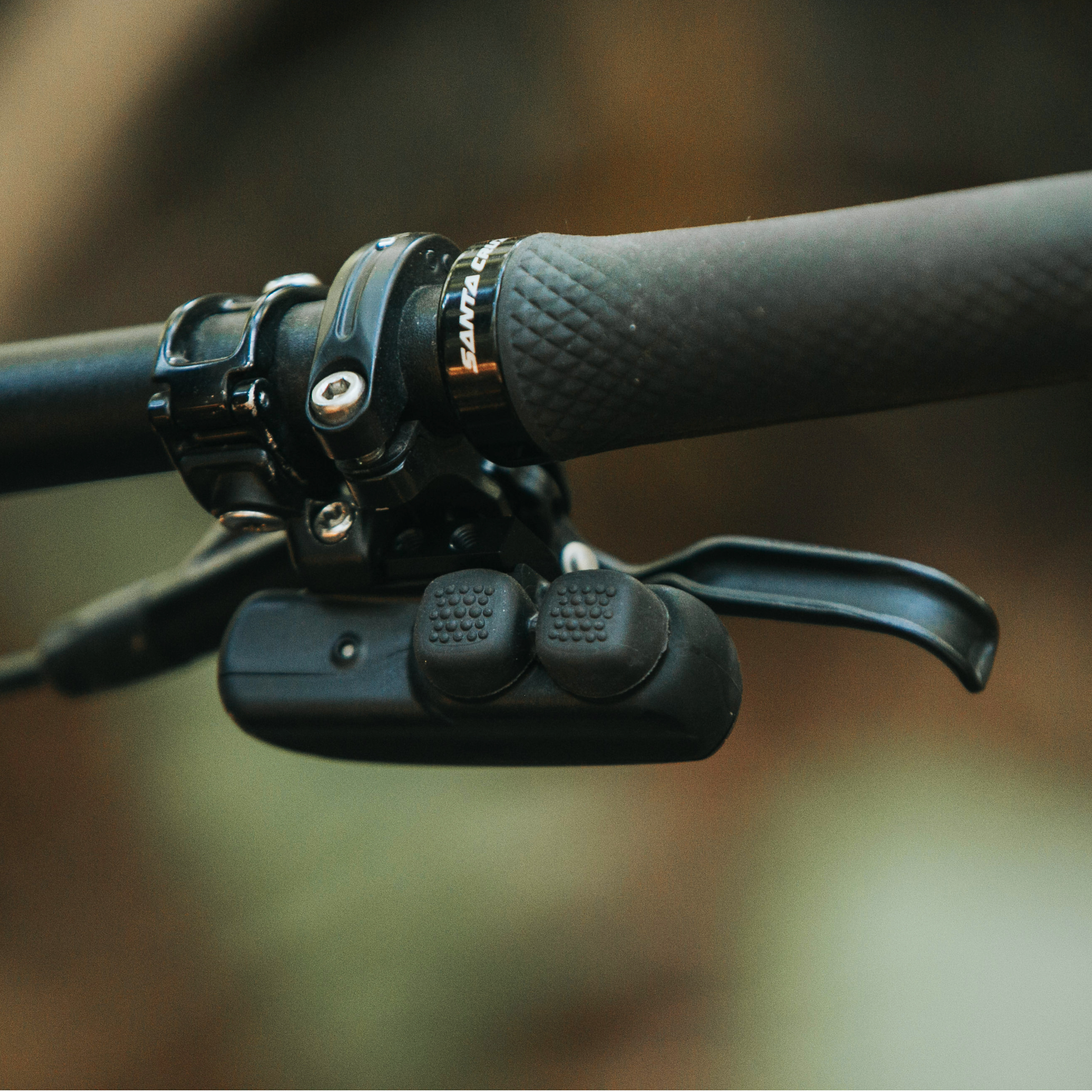
Handlebar mounted controls

In 1990, the Japanese bike component manufacturer SunTour introduced the Browning Electronic AccuShift Transmission (SunTour BEAST) - a triple crankset/chainset system for mountain bikes in which one quarter of the circle is hinged along a radius. During shifting, this segment is pushed sideways by a relay operated mechanism like a railroad switch and picks up the chain that is currently running on the next cog.

In 1992 the French manufacturer Mavic introduced their first electronically controlled gear shift mechanism called Zap at the 1992 Tour de France. It was a prototype, but it achieved neither technical success nor commercial application. A development of this was used by Chris Boardman to win the opening time trial (prologue) of the 1997 Tour de France.

In 1994 Sachs introduced the Speedtronic.

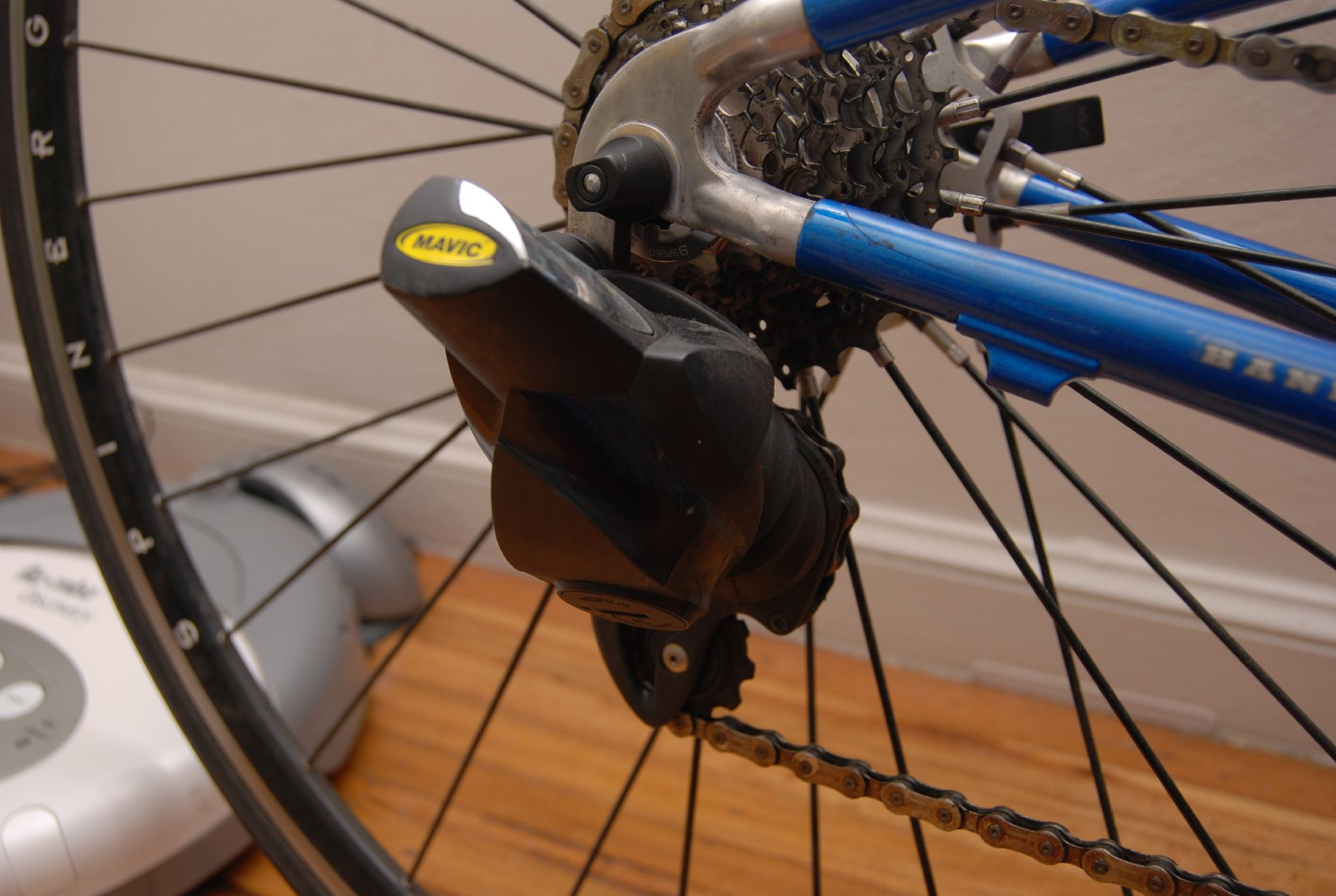
Mavic Mektronic rear derailleur

In 1999 Mavic introduced the Mektronic, its second electronic shift system, which suffered from reliability issues and was subsequently discontinued.

In 2001 Shimano introduced a set of trekking components called Di2 (Digital Integrated Intelligence), which included electronic shifting and automatic adaption of front and rear derailleur to riding speed.

During the 2000s both Shimano and Campagnolo (2005) experimented with electronic shifting in professional cycle races.

The first commercially successful electronic gear shift system for road bicycles was introduced by Shimano in 2009, the Di2. Three professional teams used the Di2 in the 2009 Tour of California: Columbia High Road, Garmin Slipstream, and Rabobank; and several teams and riders, including George Hincapie, used it during the 2009 Tour de France

Also in 2009 Giant released a bicycle equipped with the Shimano Di2 and Trek began providing a battery mount and Di2-specific cable routing and stops on its Madone frames.

In 2015 SRAM announced its wireless electronic groupset called, SRAM RED eTap. The group was released in Spring of 2016 and is available on complete bikes and through aftermarket SRAM component dealers.

A wireless system that can be retrofitted onto any bicycle was announced in 2016. The front and rear derailleurs remain in place, while a wireless gear-change controller is added to the handlebar, with configuration of the system via an iOS/Android app, and customization can be added to the button controllers via the Bluetooth app.

== Implementation ==
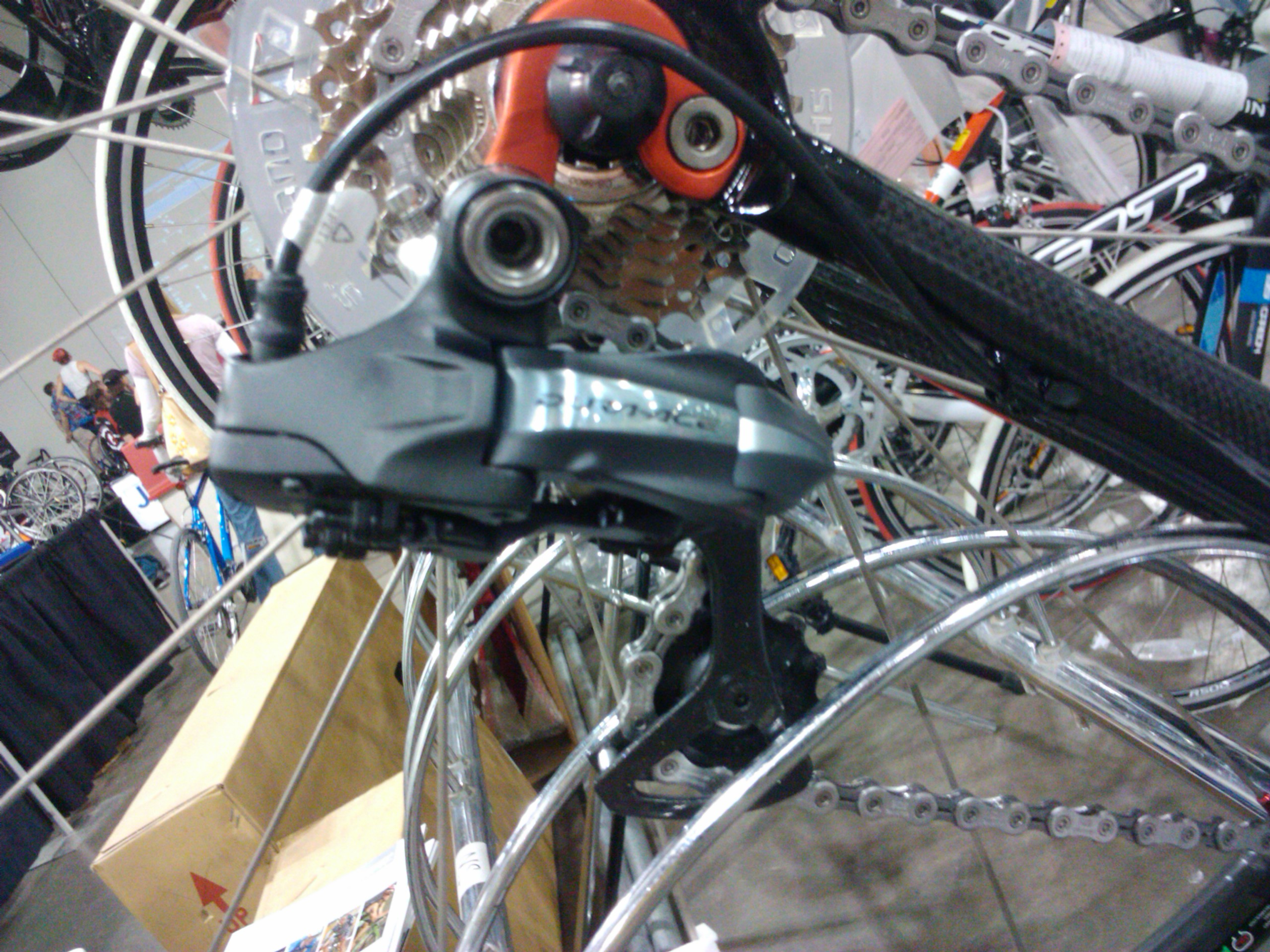
Electronic rear derailleur

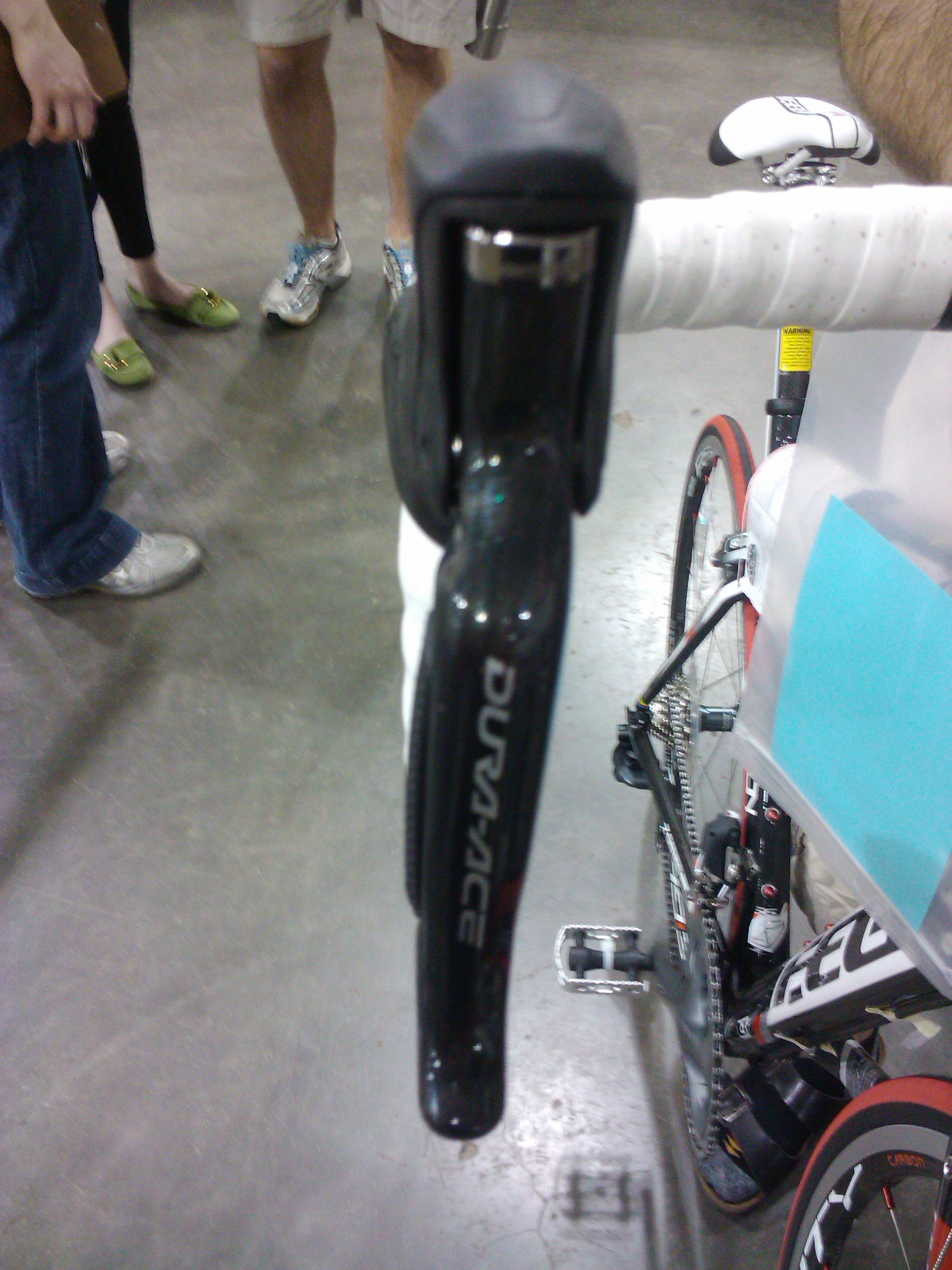
Electronic shift lever

As of 2009, one system was commercially available from a major parts manufacturer: Shimano's Di2 (Dura-Ace 7970) for road bicycles. While the traditional method of gear shifting uses mechanical control levers that pull and release Bowden cables and spring-loaded derailleurs, Di2 is controlled by electronic switches located either in the integrated shift levers and/or at the end of time trial bars. The switches send signals through a wiring harness to a battery pack, placed near the bottom bracket. The rechargeable lithium-ion battery pack supplies power to the derailleur motors, which move the derailleurs via worm gears. Shimano estimates that their 7.4-volt battery pack can last up to 1,000 kilometres (620 mi) per charge. The system also has an LED light to warn when it needs a charge.

The rear derailleur has shift times similar to mechanical systems and a break-away system to protect it in case of a crash. The front derailleur, however, switches gears almost 30% faster than Dura-Ace’s mechanical counterpart. On traditional bikes, the front derailleur is problematic because the chain can be under tension and has to make a large vertical jump between chainrings. The electronic system's controlled motion overcomes these problems. The Di2 can also trim the front derailleur to eliminate chain rub and calibrate itself to adjust for wear and tear. Finally, the entire 7970 groupset weighs approximately 113 grams (4.0 oz) less than the 7800 it replaces but 68 grams (2.4 oz) more than the new 7900.

In 2011 Shimano introduced the Ultegra Di2 electronic gear change set, a cheaper version of the electronic Dura-Ace system. This set seemed to provide an electronic option within reach of a wider audience.

Campagnolo introduced their first system of electronic shifting, EPS, in the same year. By 2012 Campagnolo had three electronic shifting groupsets available. Cyclists began to see a growing range of electronic alternatives to traditional mechanical shifting for derailleur gears.

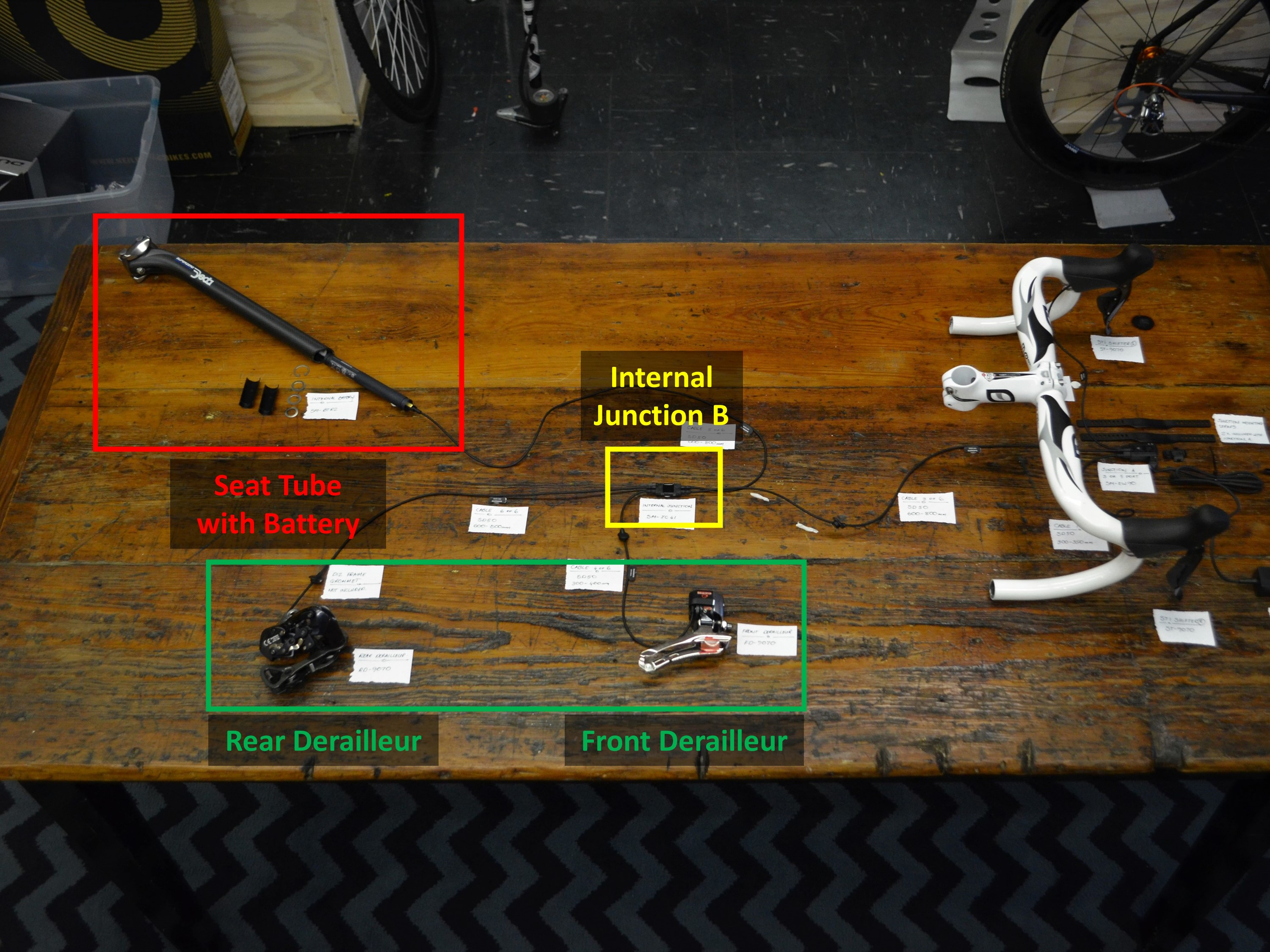
Parts of a wired system - rear

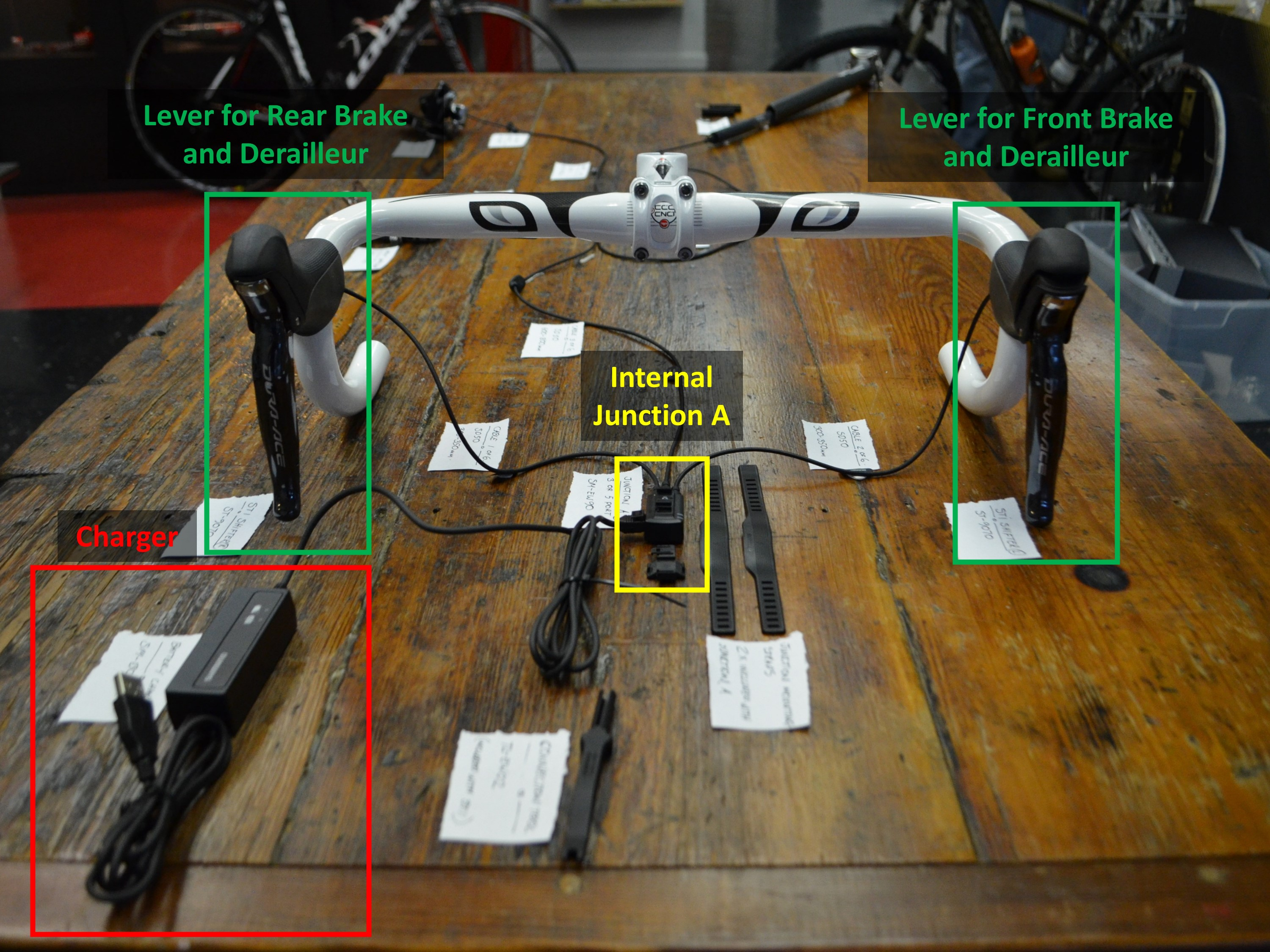
Parts of a wired system - front

== Wireless shifting ==
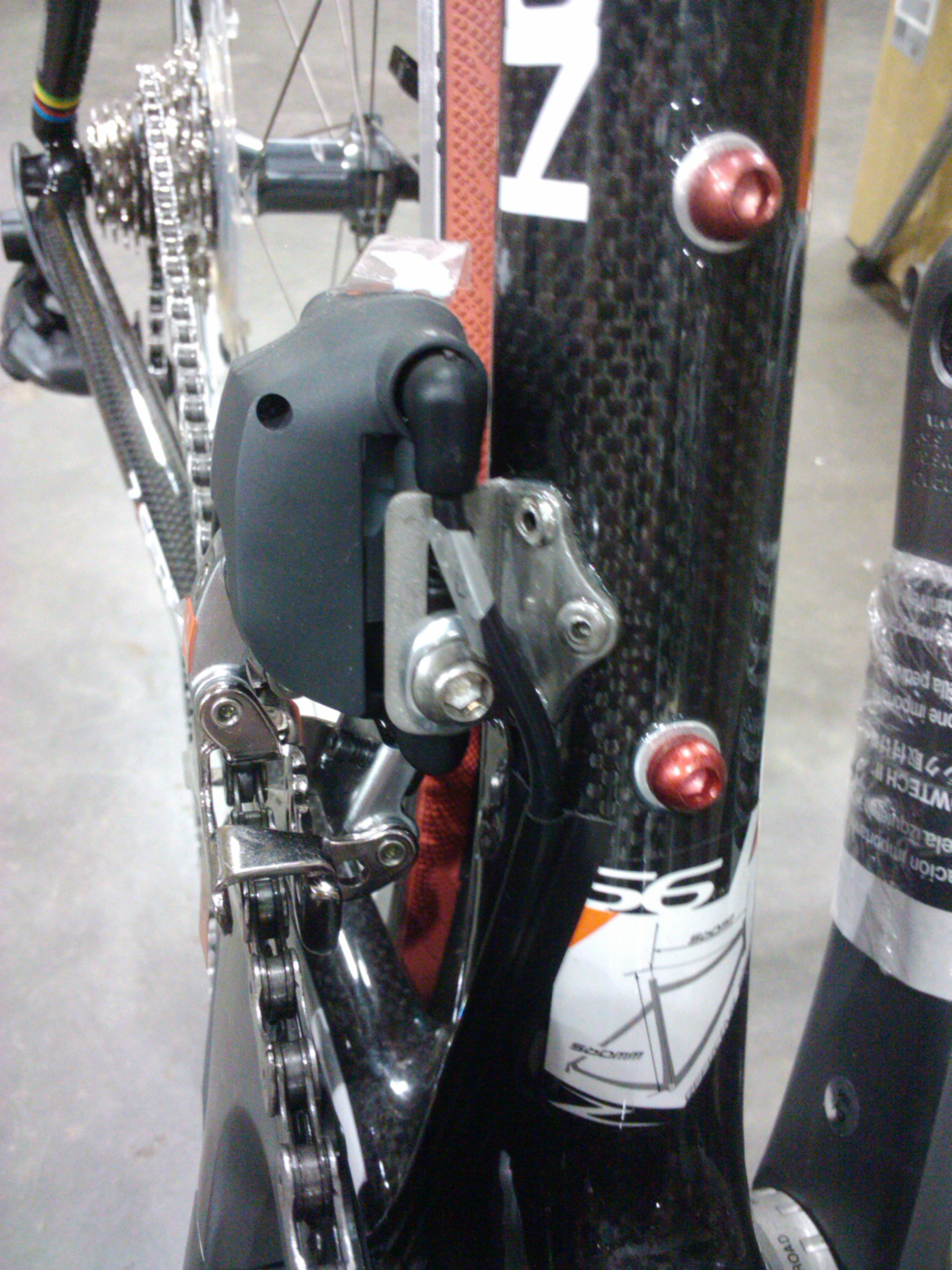
Electronic front derailleur (front view)

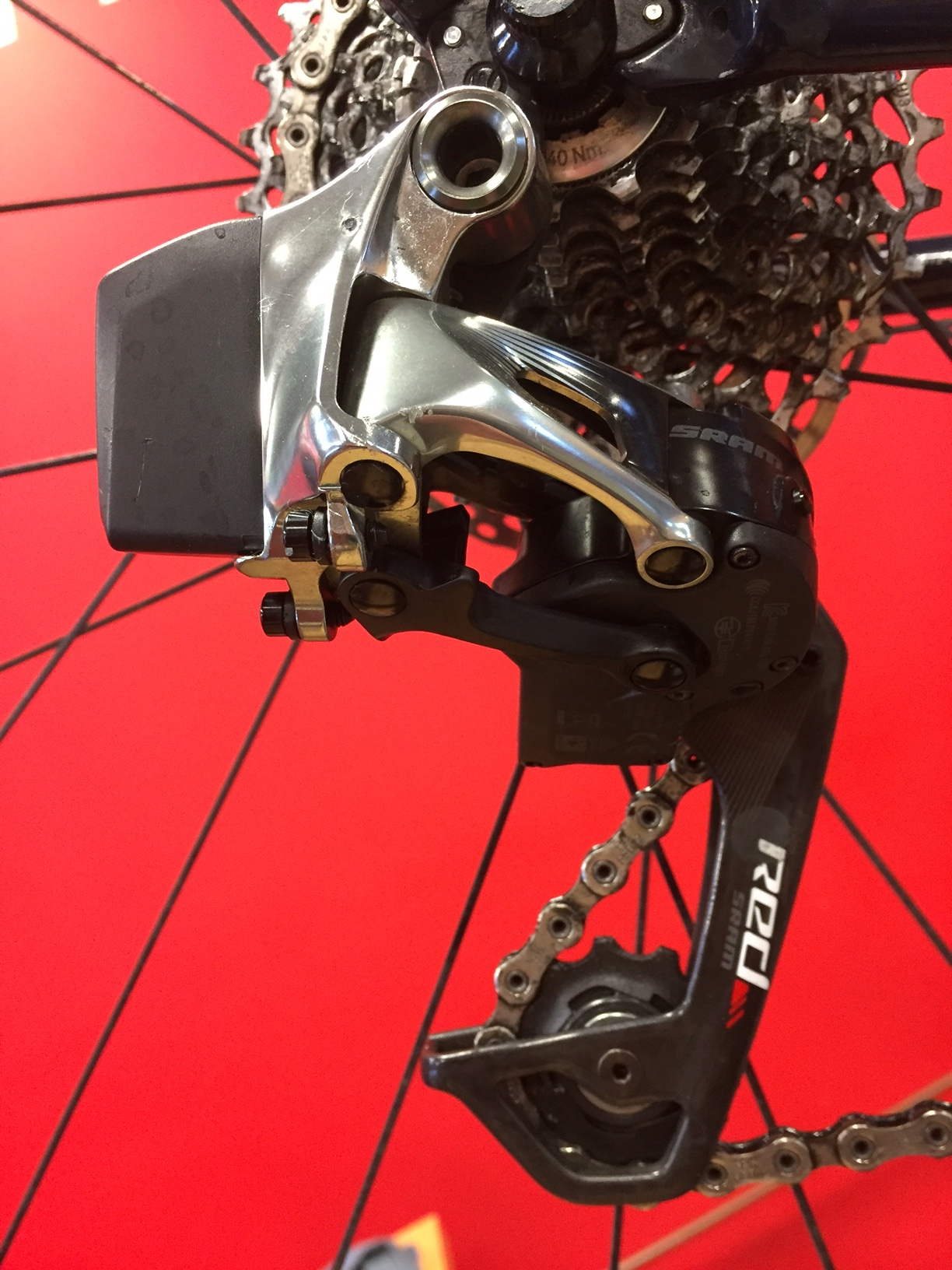
Production SRAM RED eTap rear derailleur installed on bike (2017)

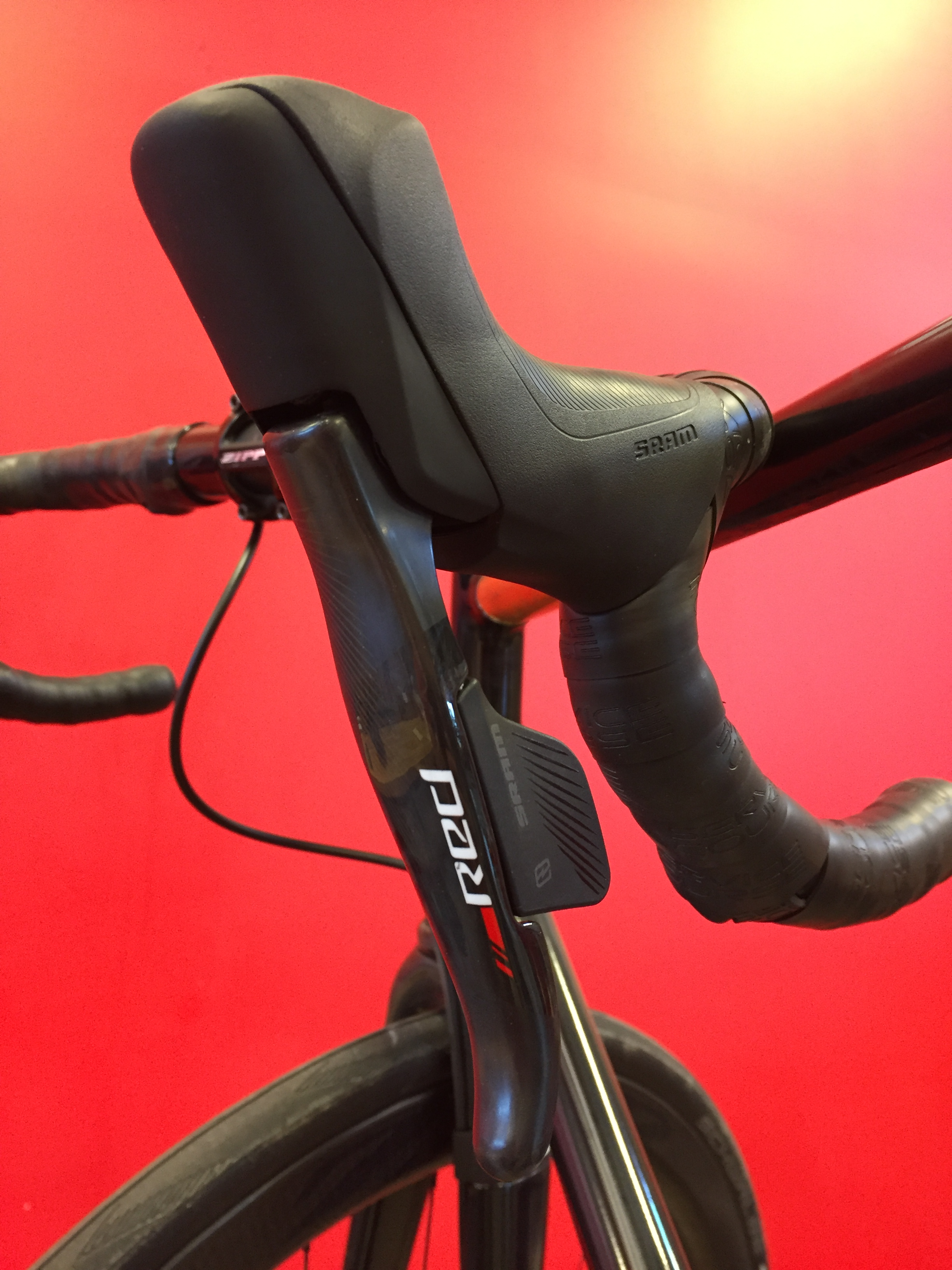
SRAM RED eTap HRD brake lever

A wireless system was announced by Tiso in 2012, but this did not achieve widespread use.

In August 2015 SRAM Corporation announced its wireless shifting system, eTap. The system had been extensively developed and secretly tested over several years from initial design to a stage win in the 2015 Tour de France. The front and rear derailleurs use direct-mount batteries and communicate wirelessly with the shifters through a proprietary wireless protocol developed by SRAM called, Airea (pronounced: area). A set of small satellite shifter buttons, called Blips, can be connected to the shift levers or aero shift module (BlipBox) and placed anywhere along the handlebars as part of the system. A maximum of four Blips can be used per bike. The company also took the opportunity to introduce a new shifting convention with this system. The right lever shifts the rear derailleur outboard, the left lever shifts the rear derailleur inboard, and pressing both levers together shifts the front derailleur. SRAM made the groupset available for purchase on complete bikes and as aftermarket components sold through dealers from Spring 2016. Eventually, extension of the system is expected to the company's lower group sets, such as SRAM Force. In May 2016 the company announced a hydraulic disc brake version of its wireless road group called SRAM RED eTap HRD. The new brakes make use of a hydraulic lever design with both lever reach adjustment and lever contact point adjustment, a first for road disc brakes.

== Advantages and disadvantages ==
An electronic system can have several advantages over a comparable mechanical system:

- eliminate the need for the rider to switch hand positions in order to shift
- allow for an accurate and effortless shift, even in difficult circumstances, such as if the rider has cold hands or is completely exhausted
- shifting performance is not affected by contaminated, stretched, or worn Bowden cables
- automatic trim function can eliminate chain rub
- shifts can be timed to occur at a particular point in the cassette or chainring rotation, making best and smoothest use of ramps and cutouts in the sprocket teeth
- the front and rear shift pattern on a bike with multiple chainrings can be programmed to make best use of the gear progression, avoid duplicate ratios and relieve the rider of the need to decide what combination of front and rear sprockets to employ
- the smoothness of electronics can reduce the shock on drivetrain components

An electronic system may have some disadvantages when compared to a mechanical system:

- There is currently no option for manual override when the battery is exhausted. This could pose a problem for riders, depending on the type of terrain on which they are riding. However, SRAM's RED eTap groupset's interchangeable derailleur batteries makes it possible to manually switch batteries between the two derailleurs in order to place the battery with remaining charge onto the derailleur the user intends to shift.
- Reliability issues have caused previous electronic systems to be withdrawn from the market. As of recently, all electronic group sets are fully waterproof. External connectors are completely waterproof, but internal connectors (internal routing for wired systems) need to be shrink wrapped with shrink tubing to be waterproof.
- Cost: The system is expensive compared to lower end mechanical derailleur systems. (The Shimano Dura Ace Di2 system costs in excess of $2500 in May, 2010).
- Weight: Electronic groupsets are typically heavier than their mechanical counterparts.

== See also ==
- Hub gear
- Outline of cycling
- NuVinci continuously variable transmission
- Semi-automatic transmission
