= Edmund Hugh Hodgkinson =

Edmund Hugh Hodgkinson (23 November 1857 – 16 October 1943) was a British bicycle inventor who in 1896 patented the Gradient three-speed gear changing system, one of the very earliest proposals for a derailleur.

Hodgkinson was born in Marylebone to Sir George Edmund Hodgkinson, a shipbuilder, and Ellen Hodgkinson.

== Patent ==
The patent application in 1896 (patent 1570), described a system in which

For the purpose of altering the speed of the gearing two or more pinions of different sizes are provided and arrangements made for shifting the driving chain from pinion to pinion.

("pinion" = "sprocket" in modern terms)

The Gradient system based on these ideas was introduced commercially in 1900.

== Design ==
The system used two chain-lifters to lift the chain from the sprockets. The cyclist would then back-pedal to disengage the chain and then shift the sprocket cluster laterally to the desired position. It would then engage when the cyclist started pedalling again. To allow for the smaller sprockets to slide into the hub, the larger gears were away from the wheel (unlike modern sprockets).

A pulley on a spring-mounted arm adjusted for the chain slack; this system was originally introduced in the 1884 patent of Linley, Biggs and Tandy.

In 1904, Hodgkinson sold an improved version of the Gradient design to Terot et Compagnie of Dijon, France, who were producing a version by 1907.
