= SunTour =

Manufacturer of bicycle components

SR Suntour
- Traded as: SR Suntour Inc.
- Industry: Bicycle components
- Founded: 1912
- Headquarters: Changhua, Taiwan
- Area served: Worldwide
- Website: srsuntour-cycling.com

SR Suntour (stylized as SR SUNTOUR) is a Taiwanese manufacturer of bicycle components, formed in 1988 when Osaka based SunTour (Maeda) went bankrupt and was purchased by Sakae Ringyo Company (abbreviated S.R.), a major Japanese maker of aluminum parts, particularly cranks and seat posts. SunTour's sales and commercial success peaked from the late 1970s to the mid-1980s.

SR Suntour maintains manufacturing in Taiwan and mainland China. Its products range from suspension forks to e-bike components such as motors and battery packs.

== History ==
=== Maeda Iron Works Company ===
Begun in 1912 as Maeda Iron Works Company manufacturing freewheels and sprockets, the company concentrated on producing bicycle gearing components.

In the 1950s, the company began producing its version of pull-chain, rod-guided, touring derailleurs, similar to those of French derailleur companies such as Huret and Simplex.

=== SunTour ===
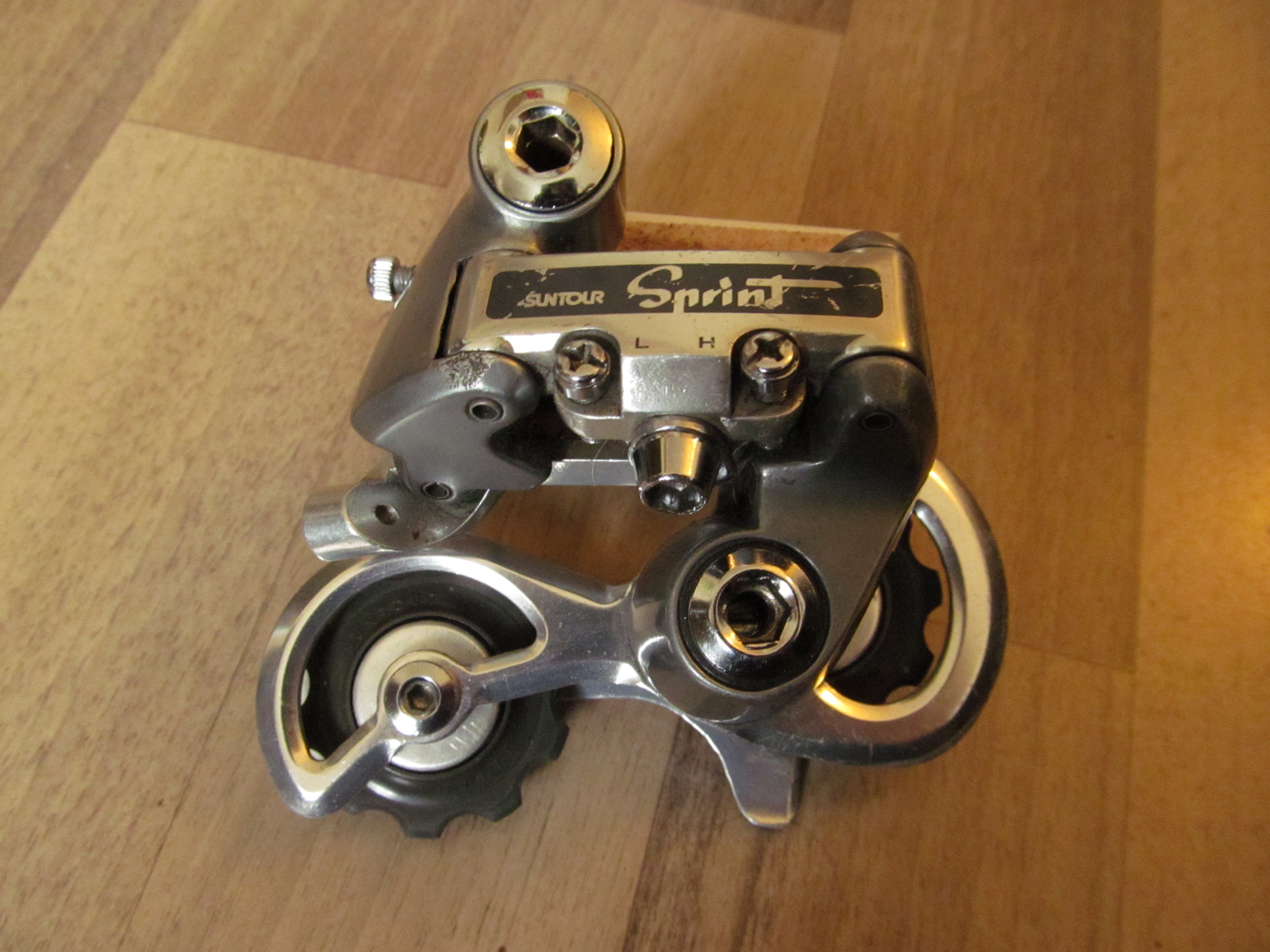
A Suntour Sprint rear derailleur

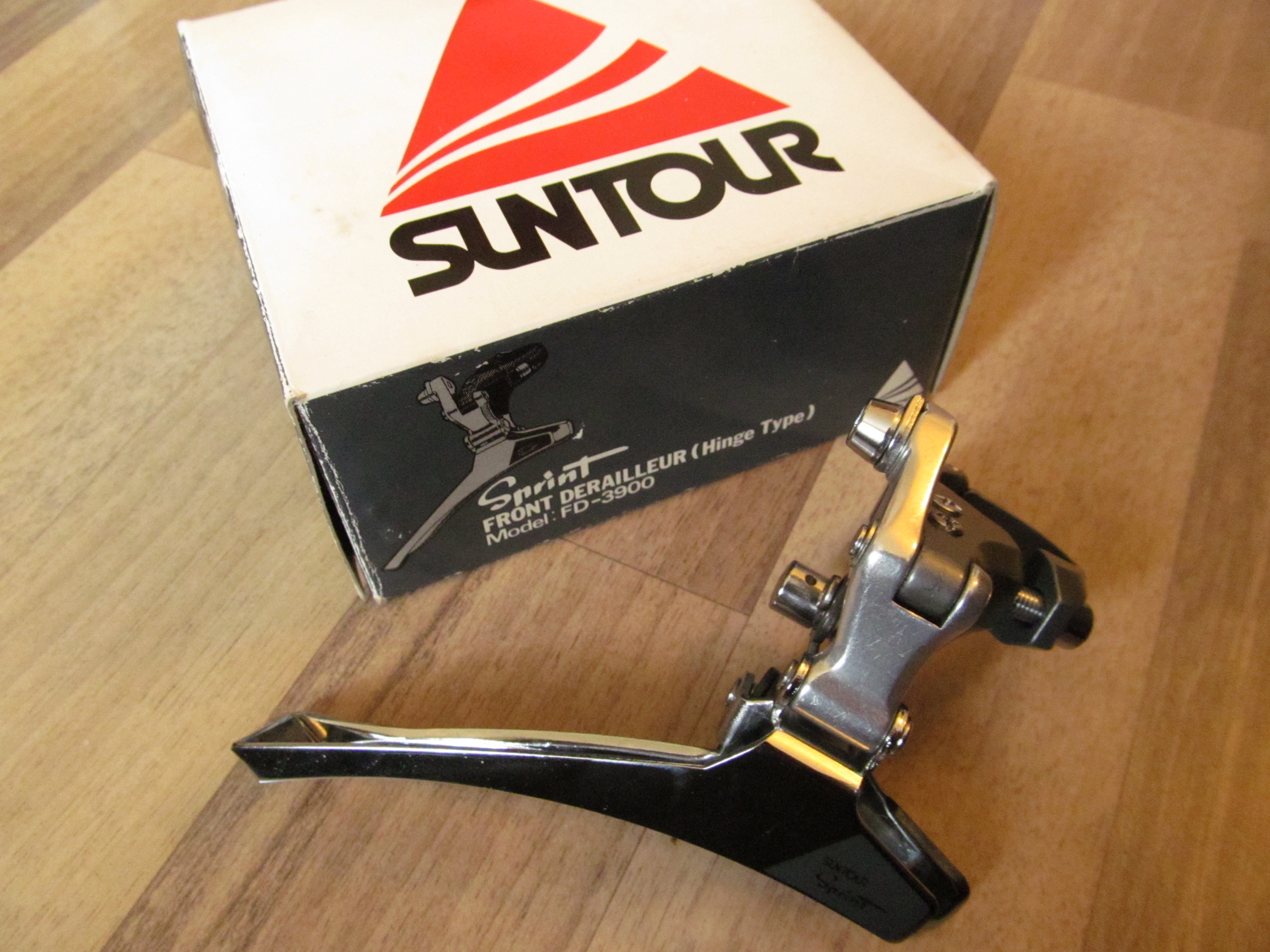
A front derailleur manufactured by Suntour

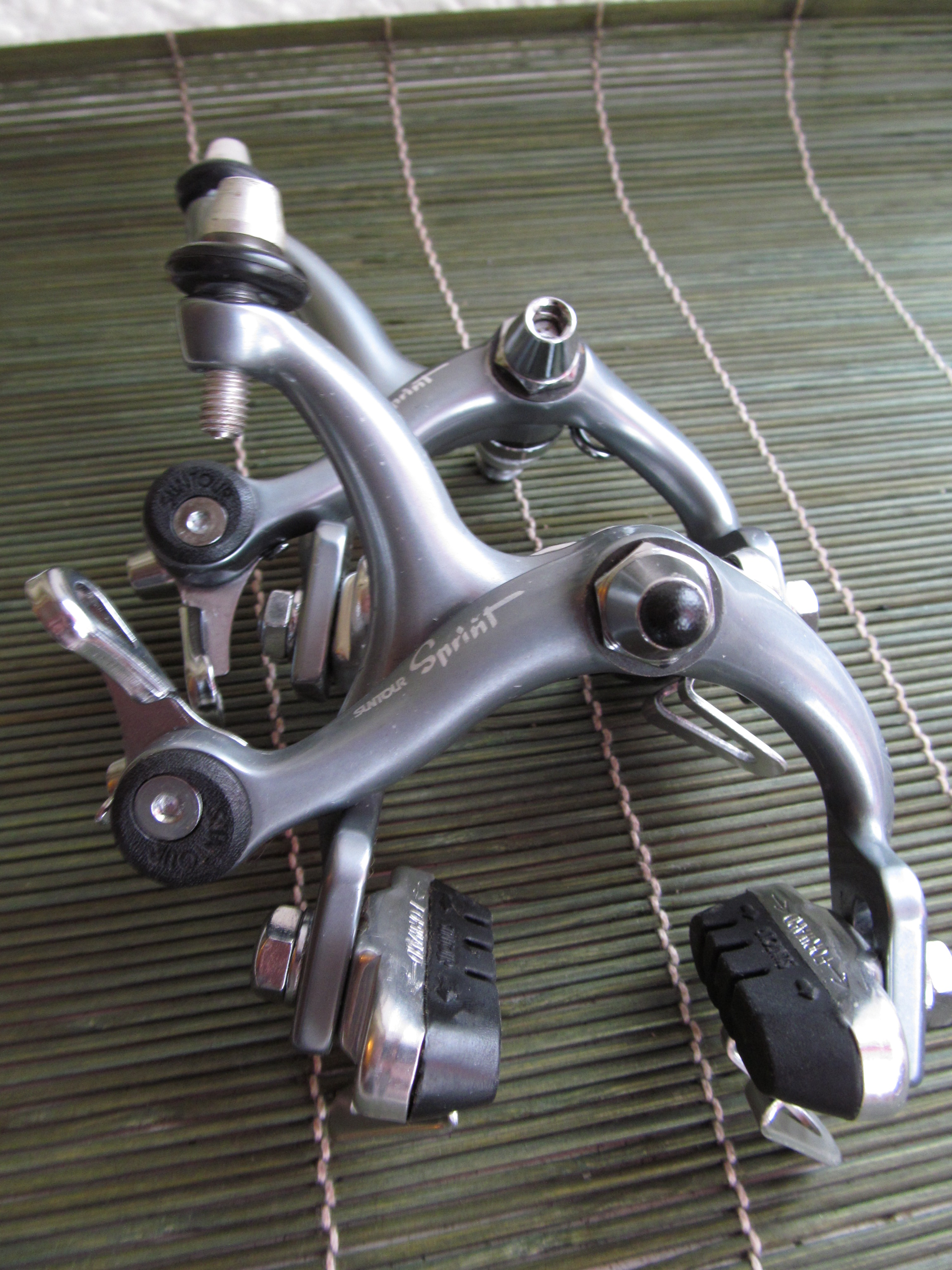
a pair of Suntour road brakes

In 1964, Suntour invented the slant-parallelogram rear derailleur. The parallelogram rear derailleur had gained prominence after Campagnolo's introduction of the "Gran Sport" in 1949, and the slant-parallelogram was an improvement of it that allowed the derailleur to maintain a more constant distance from the sprockets, resulting in easier shifting. The SunTour derailleur cost less than Campagnolo, Huret, Shimano, or Simplex and it performed especially well shifting under load, as when changing to a lower gear while pedaling up a steep incline. A contemporary Consumer Reports test reported that "SunTour was far and away the easiest to shift and the most certain of arriving at the right sprocket."

Suntour's slant-parallelogram, spring-loaded top pivot rear derailleur provided the best shifting on the market. When Suntour's rear derailleur patent expired, the design was promptly copied by Shimano.

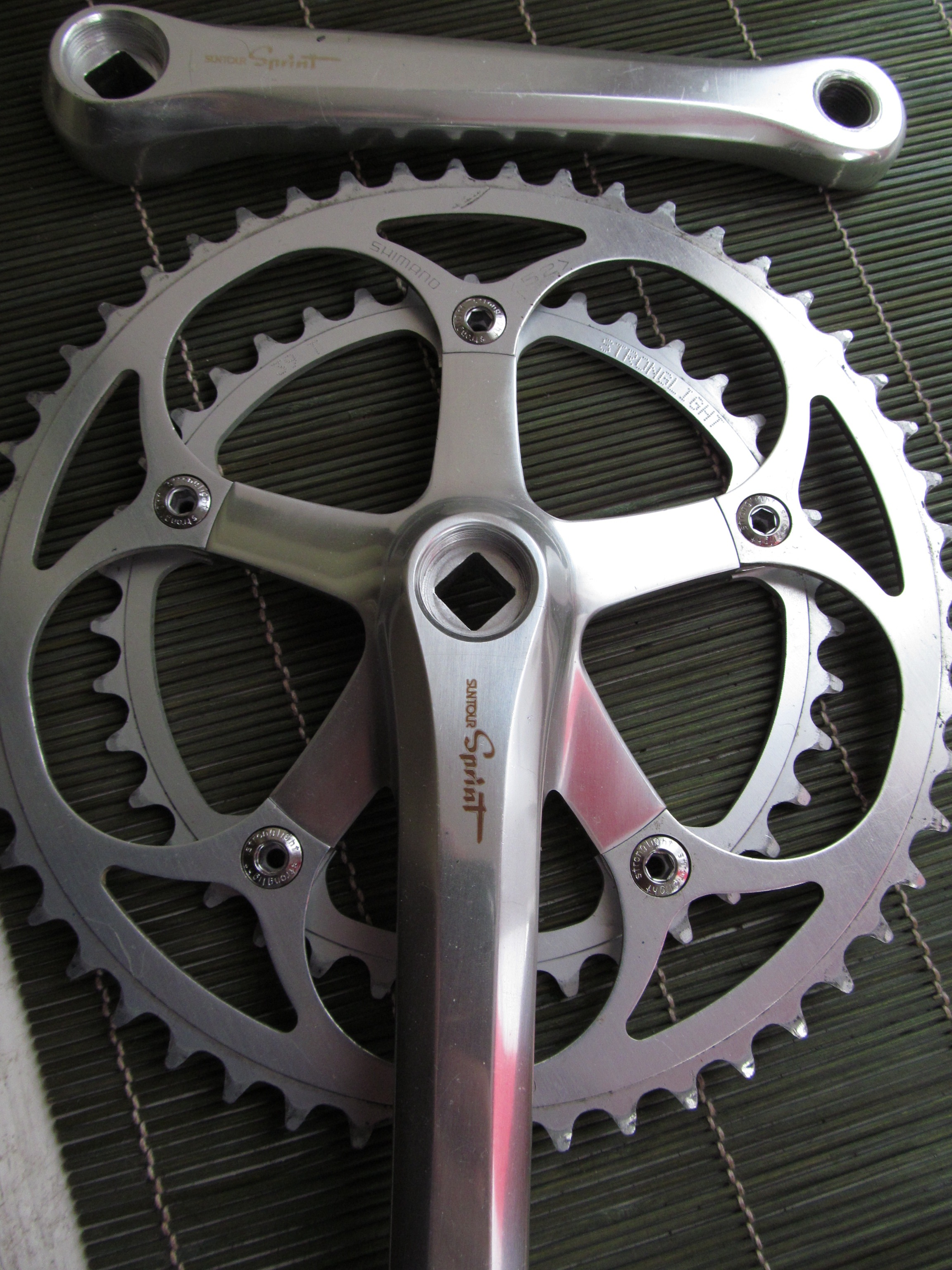
Suntour sprint crankset

In 1969, SunTour was the first Japanese gear and shifter manufacturer to introduce indexed shifting on bicycles (indexed shifting appeared at least as early as the Funiculo derailleur fitted to 1935 Schulz bicycles). Although their system, called Five-Speed Click, worked well, it proved an idea ahead of its time and did not catch on with the riding public. Another design innovation was the first practical Japanese freehub — the Unit-Hub - which combined freewheel and hub in one component (unit hubs were available at least as early as the 1938 Bayliss-Wiley, probably earlier). The freehub greatly increased the strength of the rear wheel, but the idea was not pursued.

In the early 1970s, demand created by the bike boom in the United States exceeded the capacity of European manufacturers. SunTour and Shimano filled the vacuum. SunTour focused on refining existing systems and designs for mid-level and high-end products. Like Shimano, SunTour initially did not sell complete group-sets, so it teamed with other parts makers, such as Sugino for cranksets and Dia-Compe for brakes, so it could sell a complete line of SunTour branded components. Under these types of production agreements, companies did not have design control; if a cooperating component manufacturer decided not to upgrade or redesign its products, SunTour could do little about it. Shimano decided to greatly expand its research and development staff to 200 employees, enabling the company to end its component marketing agreements in order to produce hubs, pedals, brakes, and other components on its own in competition with its former partners. In comparison, SunTour chose to continue with its existing research and development staff of some 20 persons, and remained primarily a bicycle gear and shifter manufacturer.

Unlike other bicycle component manufacturers, Suntour did not charge what the market would bear, but instead charged a price that covered costs of production plus a small profit markup. As a result, a Suntour derailleur costing $10 competed against similar level products from Campagnolo ($40) and Shimano ($20). As Suntour derailleurs and shifters could be specified on many more low- and mid-priced bicycles, the company gained a reputation with the general public as a producer of only low-end equipment. This reputation would eventually hurt sales when Suntour introduced a complete high-end component group, Superbe Pro.

Despite emerging problems, Suntour continued to achieve a number of innovations, particularly in components for mountain bikes. In partnership with Sugino, it introduced the 110/74mm BCD five-bolt triple crankset for mountain bikes, which soon became an industry standard. Next was the introduction of the Micro Drive 94/56mm BCD five-bolt compact mountain bike crankset, which saved weight, increased ground clearance, and permitted lower gearing for hill-climbing. New, short-cage rear derailleurs were provided to go with the Micro Drive cassette-type cogsets. The new system was very popular, and Shimano adopted the compact drive concept two years later. SunTour's new thumb and trigger shifters made shifting more convenient when riding off-pavement.

The company's decision to limit funding and staff for research and development caused running issues with new products. The first sign of trouble came with returns on SunTour's SR MounTech rear derailleur, caused by failures of the innovative spring-loaded jockey wheel that was fitted with a seal that proved inadequate to keep out dirt and mud. In road bicycle components, the company fared no better. SunTour had introduced the SuperbeTech derailleur in 1983 with a streamlined, enclosed parallelogram. However, the design was too fragile, with internal pivots and the return spring failing frequently. It took special tools to repair and reassemble a SuperbeTech derailleur, resulting in many unhappy customers. SunTour no longer had the resources to debug prototype designs before introducing them to the market, which cost the company in returns, repairs, and damaged reputation.

Another blow came when the yen was revalued in 1985. SunTour could no longer compete on costs with a slew of manufacturers producing in Taiwan and other lower labor-cost countries. Existing orders had been written in foreign currencies, rather than yen, so SunTour suffered a major loss. It had to borrow additional cash to finance a transfer of manufacturing facilities to Taiwan, as well as begin development of new mountain bike components.

In 1987, SunTour introduced its new attempt at an indexed shifting system, AccuShift. AccuShift came late to the market to compete with Shimano's new SIS system introduced two years before, which cost SunTour dearly. With two years of lead time, Shimano could afford to require that bicycle manufacturers equip their bikes with complete SIS shifting systems, minimizing problems with product compatibility. SunTour, on the other hand, desperately needed orders, so the company could not insist on complete SunTour component groups that had been tested to ensure compatibility with AccuShift. As a consequence, major bicycle manufacturers such as Schwinn and Raleigh installed Accu-Shift on low-end bikes using inventories of older freewheels, hubs, cables, cable housings, and chains from other manufacturers. The practice resulted in a mismatched 'system' that did not provide the critical tolerances needed for reliable indexed shifting.

=== SR-SunTour ===
In 1987, Japanese engineering company Mori Industries Inc. (with manufacturing plants in Taiwan) bought Sakae Ringyo Company.

In 1988 the SunTour name was purchased and revived by Sakae Ringyo Company, (now owned by Mori Industries Inc.) with a capital investment of 45,000,000 NT$ in Tokyo, Japan, thus becoming SR-SunTour. The new SR-SunTour parts are not compatible with the original SunTour parts.

By 1993, SunTour's share of the market had dropped to five per cent of the U.S. market. At the end of 1994, Mori decided to shut down their bicycle component business. In March 1995 Daisuke Kobayashi and Hideo Hashizume, the former owners of Sakae Ringyo, arranged a management buyout. The new management took over in July, 1995, purchasing the SunTour name and the SR factory in Taiwan. Mori Industries left the bicycle component business, selling off SunTour's Japanese facilities piecemeal and closing its U.S. offices in early 1995.

SR Suntour re-established a US presence in 2011 as SR SUNTOUR North America Inc. In 2018 they reported experiencing 'Tremendous growth' and moved into a larger facility in Ridgefield, Washington.

Until 2011 the company was manufacturing forks for Italian suspension company Marzocchi.

=== SunXCD ===
In 2012, Junzo Kawai, former president of SunTour Japan, returned to bicycle component manufacturing with a new company called SunXCD. Two years later, at age 94, he died and company president Taki Takimoto took his place as chairman. The new company makes mainly retro components, such as high flange hubs in 120mm, 126mm, and 130mm sizes, and TA cyclotourist-style cranksets.
