= Whippet (bicycle) =

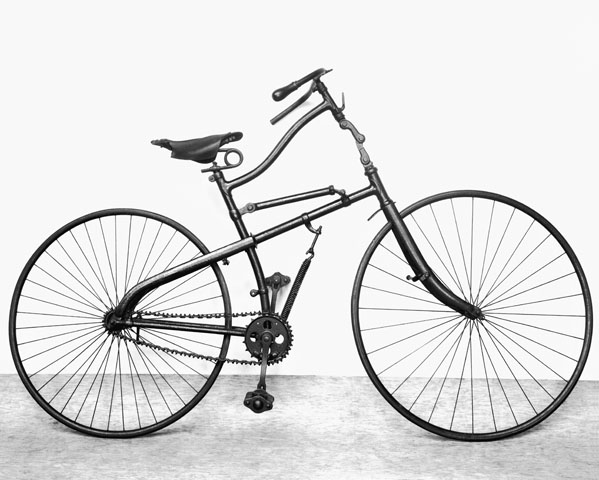
1885 Whippet safety bicycle

Whippet was a brand of safety bicycle designed by C. M. Linley and manufactured by Linley and Briggs in London. Examples exist from 1885 and 1888. They are notable for their use of springs to suspend the frame. An early external derailleur, that enabled two gear ratios and used a freewheel hub was introduced in the summer of 1894, and was available only on Whippet bicycles.

== History ==
Charles Montague Linley (1853-1933) was a very creative engineer and the Whippet bicycles were known for their innovative ideas. Linley and Biggs were working together from the early 1880s, and are named on an 1884 patent on "Improvements in Velocipedes". In 1886 at the Stanley Cycling Show they exhibited a sprung frame tricycle called the Whippet, and this was to be the trade name by which they are best known, with the Linley & Biggs company being converted to the Whippet Cycling Syndicate Ltd in 1896. The sprung frame bicycle was useful when solid tyres were used, but the complexity was no longer required after the pneumatic tyre was introduced in 1888, although the inconvenience of punctures meant it took several years before all riders were won over. Further innovations came with gearing - they were the first safety bicycle manufacturer to fit the rear hub freewheel in 1894, a pawl type with roller bearings, and the 2-speed 'Protean' gear that they used it with developed by 1899 into an early form of derailleur patented by Linley. They were also the first company to fit rim brakes, initially in slides but by 1899 they were hinged to allow for the slight irregularities that exist in all rims.

By 1899 models named the "New Whippet" had four speed 'Protean' gear, free wheel and rim brakes.

The Whippet Cycle Syndicate Ltd was wound up in 1902, and by 1907 Linley became works manager for the newly created Commercial Car Co (later known as Commer), and he patented many inventions relating to internal combustion engines, gears, etc over the next 30 years.
