= Derailleur =

Variable-ratio transmission system commonly used on bicycles

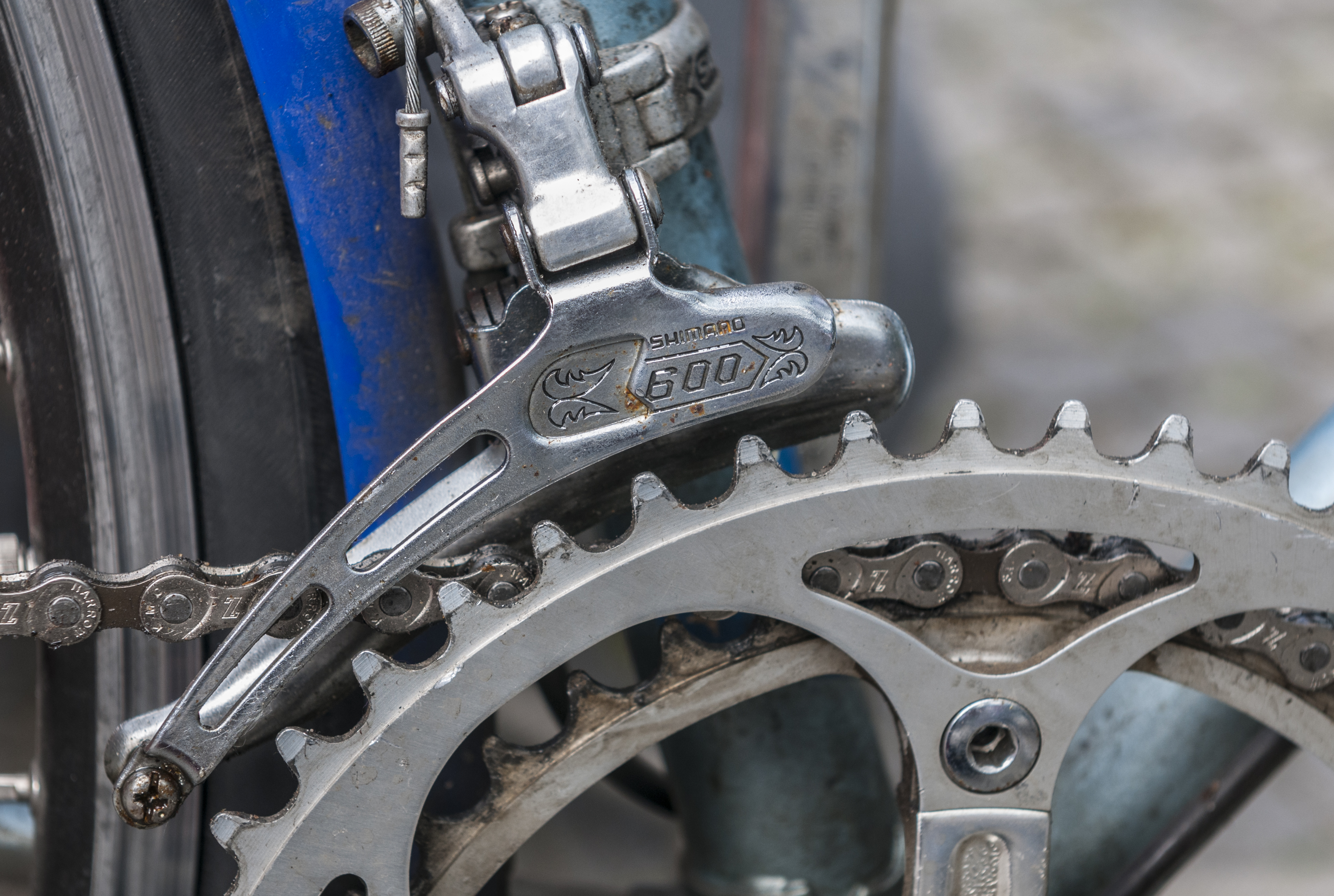
Shimano 600 front derailleur (1980)

A derailleur (/dɪˈreɪlər/ di-RAYL-ər; /dɪˈreɪljər/ di-RAYL-yər) is specifically a device that moves a bicycle chain from one sprocket to another, and more generally the entire gearset on a multiple-speed bicycle with such a mechanism.

Modern front and rear derailleurs typically consist of a moveable chain-guide that is operated remotely by a Bowden cable attached to a shifter mounted on the down tube, handlebar stem, or handlebar. When a rider operates the lever while pedalling, the change in cable tension moves the chain-guide from side to side, "derailing" the chain onto different sprockets.

== Etymology ==
The word "derailleur" is derived from the French word dérailleur ([deʁajœʁ]), literally meaning "derailer": a device used to derail a train from its tracks. Its first recorded use was in 1930.

== History ==
A modern road bicycle drivetrain with front and rear derailleurs

Various derailleur systems were designed and built in the late 19th century. One example is the Protean two-speed derailleur available on the Whippet safety bicycle. The French bicycle tourist, writer and cycling promoter Paul de Vivie (1853–1930), who wrote under the name Vélocio, invented a two-speed rear derailleur in 1905 which he used on forays into the Alps. Some early designs used rods to move the chain onto various gears. 1928 saw the introduction of the "Super Champion Gear" (or "Osgear") from the company founded by champion cyclist Oscar Egg, as well as the Vittoria Margherita* both employed chainstay mounted 'paddles' and single lever chain tensioners mounted near or on the downtube. However, these systems, along with the rod-operated Campagnolo Cambio Corsa were eventually superseded by parallelogram derailleurs.

In 1937, the derailleur system was introduced to the Tour de France, allowing riders to change gears without having to remove wheels. Previously, riders would have to dismount in order to change their wheel from downhill to uphill mode. Derailleurs did not become common road racing equipment until 1938 when Simplex introduced a cable-shifted derailleur.

In 1949, Campagnolo introduced the Gran Sport, a more refined version of the already existing, yet less commercially successful, cable-operated parallelogram rear derailleurs.

In 1964, Suntour invented the slant-parallelogram rear derailleur, which let the jockey pulley maintain a more constant distance from the different sized sprockets, resulting in easier shifting. Once the patents expired, other manufacturers adopted this design, at least for their better models, and the "slant parallelogram" remains the current rear derailleur pattern.

Before the 1990s many manufacturers made derailleurs, including Simplex, Huret, Galli, Mavic, Gipiemme, Zeus, Suntour, and Shimano. However, the successful introduction and promotion of indexed shifting by Shimano in 1985 required a compatible system of shift levers, derailleur, sprockets, chainrings, chain, shift cable, and shift housing.

The major innovations since the 1990s have been the switch from friction to indexed shifting and the gradual increase in the number of gears. With friction shifting, a lever directly controls the continuously variable position of the derailleur. To shift gears, the rider first moves the lever enough for the chain to jump to the next sprocket, and then adjusts the lever a slight amount to center the chain on that sprocket. An indexed shifter has a detent or ratchet mechanism which stops the gear lever, and hence the cable and the derailleur, after moving a specific distance with each press or pull. Indexed shifters require re-calibration when cables stretch and parts get damaged or swapped. On racing bicycles, 10-gear rear cassettes appeared in 2000, and 11-gear cassettes appeared in 2009. Most current mountain bicycles have either. Many modern, high-end mountain bikes have begun using entirely one-chainring drivetrains, with the industry constantly pushing the number of rear cogs up and up, as shown by SRAM's Eagle groupsets (1 by 12) and Rotor's recent 1 by 13 drive-train. Most road bicycles have two chainrings, and touring bicycles commonly have three.

An electronic gear-shifting system enables riders to shift with electronic switches instead of using conventional control levers. The switches are connected by wire or wirelessly to a battery pack and to a small electric motor that drives the derailleur. Although expensive, an electronic system could save a racing cyclist time when changing gears.

The three main manufacturers of derailleurs are Shimano (Japan), SRAM (USA), and Campagnolo (Italy).

== Rear derailleurs ==
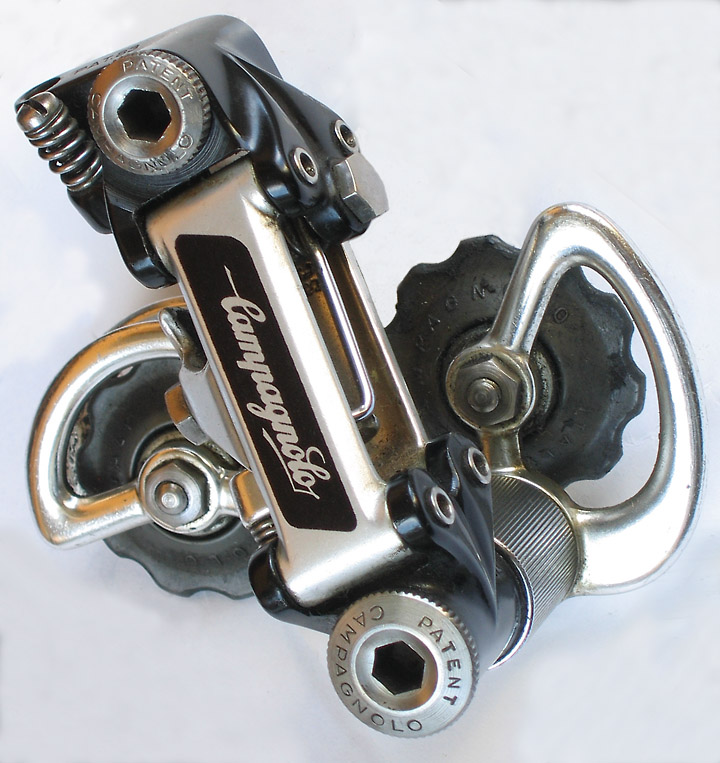
Campagnolo Super Record rear derailleur (1983)

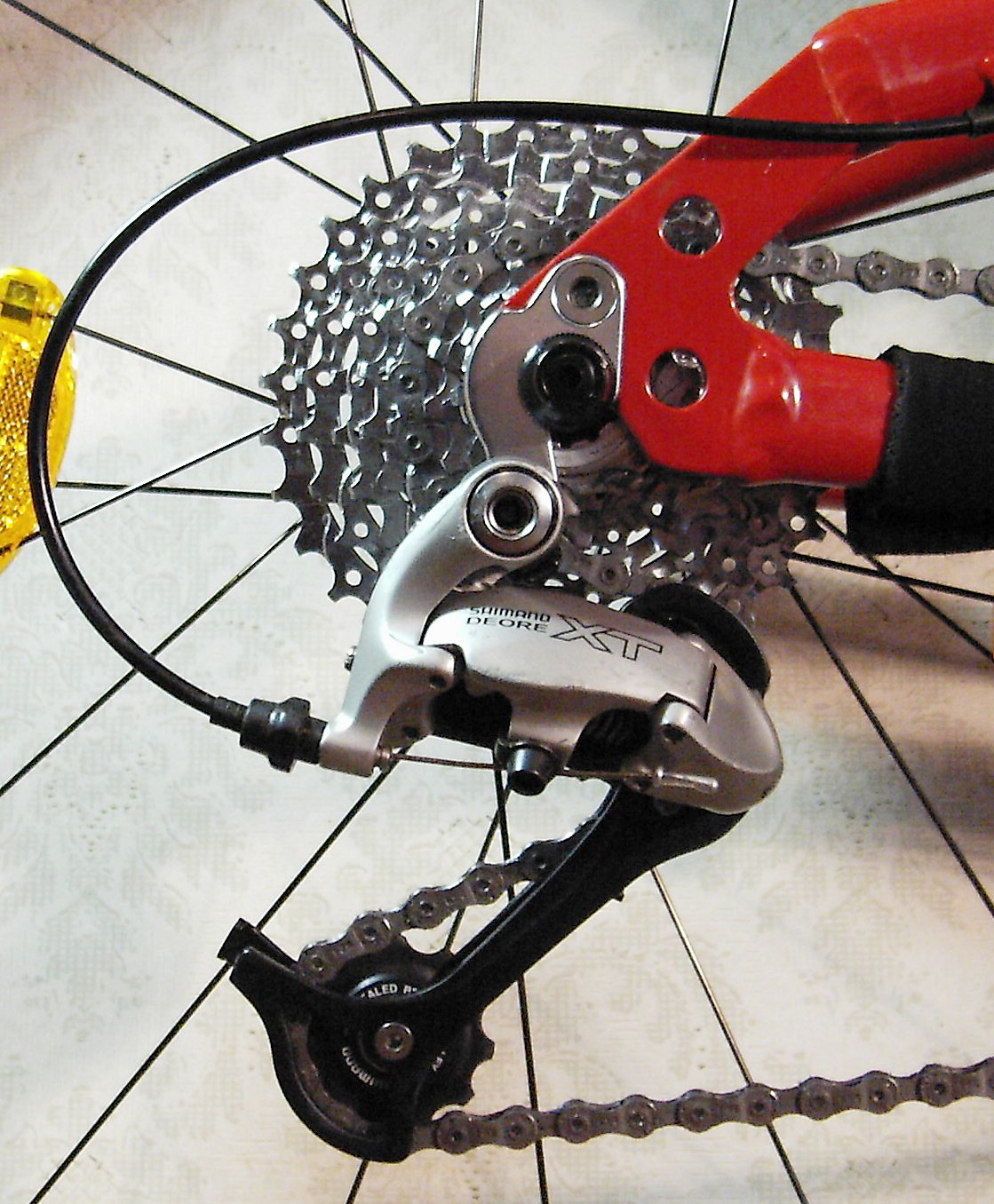
Shimano XT rear derailleur on a mountain bike

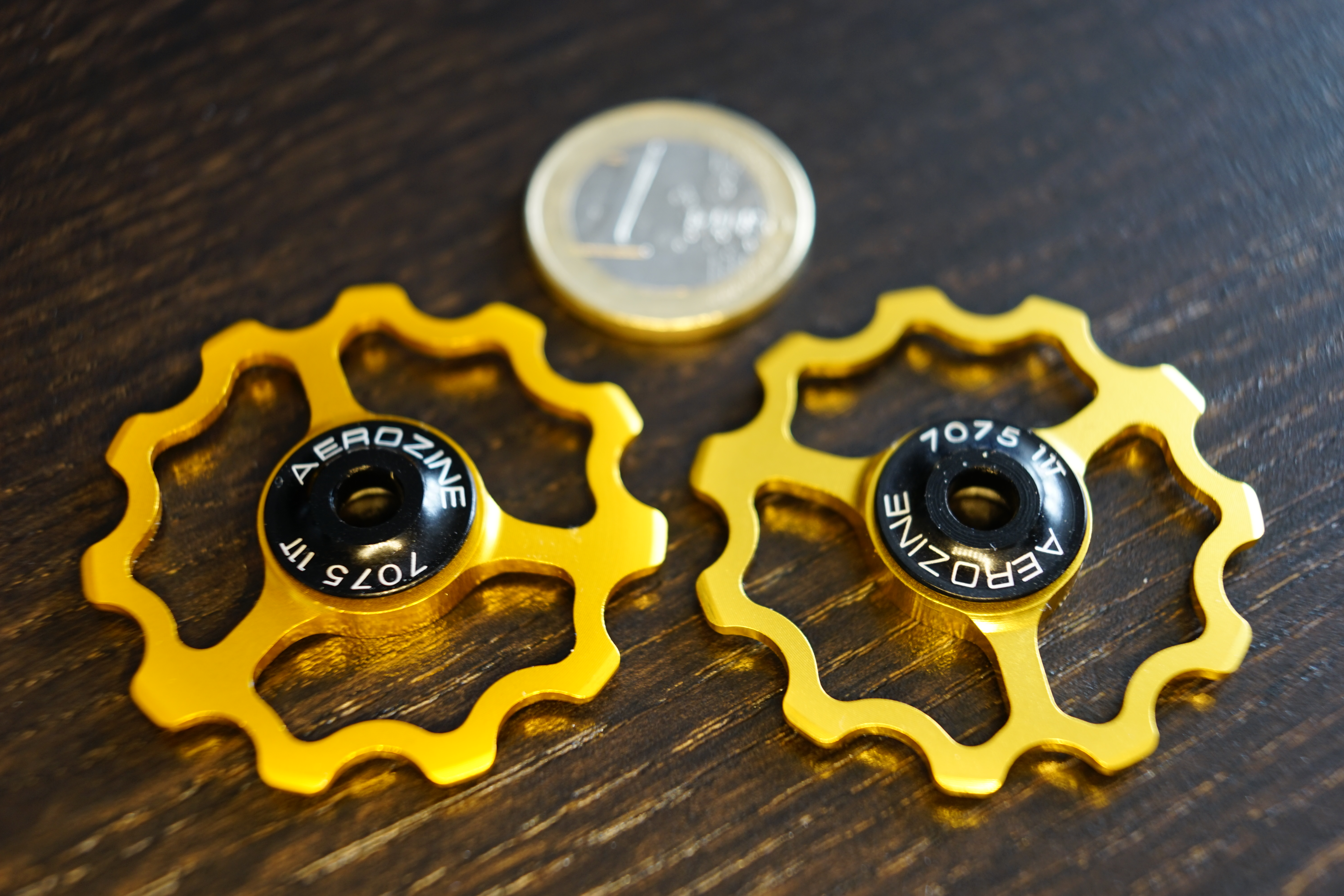
Pulley wheels for a rear derailleur

The rear derailleur has two functions: it moves the chain between rear sprockets while taking up chain slack caused by moving to a smaller sprocket at the rear or a smaller chainring by the front derailleur. In order to accomplish this second task, it is positioned in the path of the bottom, slack portion of chain. Sometimes the rear derailleurs are re-purposed as chain tensioners for single-speed bicycles that cannot adjust chain tension by a different method.

Although variations exist, most rear derailleurs have several components in common. They have a cage that holds two pulleys that guide the chain in an S-shaped pattern. The pulleys are known as the jockey pulley or guide pulley (top) and the tension pulley (bottom). The cage rotates in its plane and is spring-loaded to take up chain slack. The cage is positioned under the desired sprocket by an arm that can swing back and forth under the sprockets. The arm is usually implemented with a parallelogram mechanism to keep the cage properly aligned with the chain as it swings back and forth. The other end of the arm mounts to a pivot point attached to the bicycle frame. The arm pivots about this point to maintain the cage at a nearly constant distance from the different sized sprockets. There may be one or more adjustment screws that control the amount of lateral travel allowed and the spring tension.

The components may be constructed of aluminium alloy, steel, plastic, or carbon fibre composite. The pivot points may be bushings or ball bearings. These will require moderate lubrication.

=== Relaxed position ===
High normal or top normal rear derailleurs return the chain to the smallest sprocket on the cassette when no cable tension is applied. This is the regular pattern used on most Shimano mountain, all Shimano road, and all SRAM and Campagnolo derailleurs. In this condition, spring pressure takes care of the easier change to smaller sprockets. In road racing, the swiftest gear changes are required on the sprints to the finish line. Therefore high-normal types, which allow a quick change to a higher gear, remain the preference.

Low normal or rapid rise rear derailleurs return the chain to the largest sprocket on the cassette when no cable tension is applied. While this was once a common design for rear derailleurs, it has become relatively uncommon. In mountain biking and off-road cycling, the most critical gear changes occur on uphill sections, where riders must cope with obstacles and difficult turns while pedalling under heavy load. This derailleur type provides an advantage over high normal derailleurs because gear changes to lower gears occur in the direction of the loaded spring, making these shifts easier during high load pedalling.

=== Cage length ===
The distance between the upper and lower pulleys of a rear derailleur is known as the cage length. Cage length, when combined with the pulley size, determines the capacity of a derailleur to take up chain slack. Cage length determines the total capacity of the derailleur, that is the size difference between the largest and smallest chainrings, and the size difference between the largest and smallest sprockets on the cogset added together. A larger sum requires a longer cage length. Typical cross-country mountain bikes with three front chainrings will use a long cage rear derailleur. A road bike with only two front chainrings and close ratio sprockets can operate with either a short or long cage derailleur, but will work better with a short cage.

Manufacturer stated derailleur capacities are as follows:

- Shimano: long = 45T*, medium = 33T
- SRAM: long = 43T*, medium = 37T*, short = 30T

Benefits of a shorter cage length:

- more positive gear-changing due to less flex in the parallelogram
- better gear-changing with good cable leverage
- better obstruction clearance
- less danger of catching spokes.
- slight weight savings.

=== Cage positioning ===
There are at least two methods employed by rear derailleurs to maintain the appropriate gap between the upper jockey wheel and the rear sprockets as the derailleur moves between the large sprockets and the small sprockets. One method, used by Shimano, is to use chain tension to pivot the cage. This has the advantage of working with most sets of sprockets, if the chain has the proper length. A disadvantage is that rapid shifts from small sprockets to large over multiple sprockets at once can cause the cage to strike the sprockets before the chain moves onto the larger sprockets and pivots the cage as necessary. Another method, used by SRAM, is to design the spacing into the parallelogram mechanism of the derailleur itself. The advantage is that no amount of rapid, multi-sprocket shifting can cause the cage to strike the sprockets. The disadvantage is that there are limited options for sprocket sizes that can be used with a particular derailleur.

=== Actuation and shift ratios ===
The actuation ratio is the ratio between the amount of shifter cable length and the amount of transverse derailleur travel that it generates. Shift ratio is the reciprocal of actuation ratio and is more easily expressed for derailleurs than actuation. There are currently several standards in use, and in each the product of the derailleur's shift ratio and the length of cable pulled must equal the pitch of the rear sprockets. The following standards exist.

- The Shimano compatible family of derailleurs is stated as having a shift ratio of two-to-one (2:1), and since SRAM makes two families of components, the term has been widely adopted to distinguish it from SRAM's own one-to-one (1:1) ratio family of derailleurs. Notice that these family names do not give the exact shift ratios: the 2:1 shift ratio is in fact about 1.7 (Or 1.9 on the Dura Ace series up to 7400) rather than 2, and the native SRAM shift ratio is about 1.1. The family names of these standards are reversed by some in actuation ratio notation as opposed to that of the more common shift ratio. Thus, in Shimano systems a unit of cable shifted causes about twice as much movement of the derailleur.
- The native SRAM convention is called one-to-one (1:1). These have actual shift ratios of 1.1. A unit of cable retracted at the shifter causes about an equal amount of movement in the derailleur. SRAM claims that standard makes their systems more robust: more resistant to the effects of contamination. Some SRAM shifters are made to be 2:1 Shimano-compatible, but these clearly will not work with SRAM's 1:1 derailleurs.
- The Campagnolo convention. The shift ratios are 1.5 for modern units but their old units had 1.4 ratios.
- The Suntour's convention.

Shifters employing one convention are generally not compatible with derailleurs employing another, although exceptions exist, and adaptors are available.

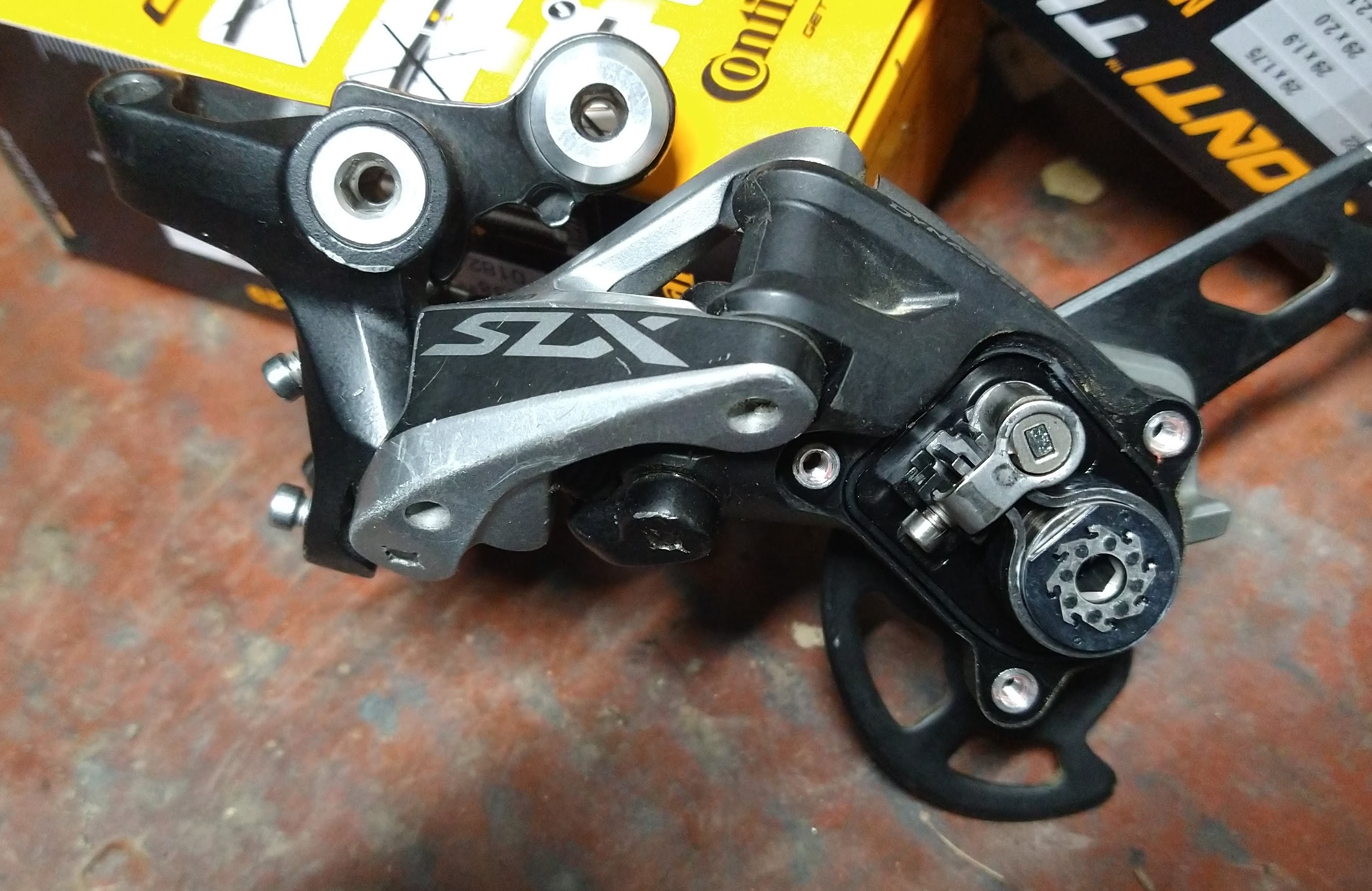
SLX Derailleur with the front plate removed, making the clutch assembly visible

=== Clutch ===
Some rear derailleurs, especially for mountain bikes, incorporate a clutch to keep the lower length of chain in sufficient tension to prevent the chain from striking the bottom of the chain stay: this is called chain slap and can damage the chain stay. Clutches are also helpful in preventing the chain from derailing from the chainring on systems without a front derailleur.

== Front derailleurs ==
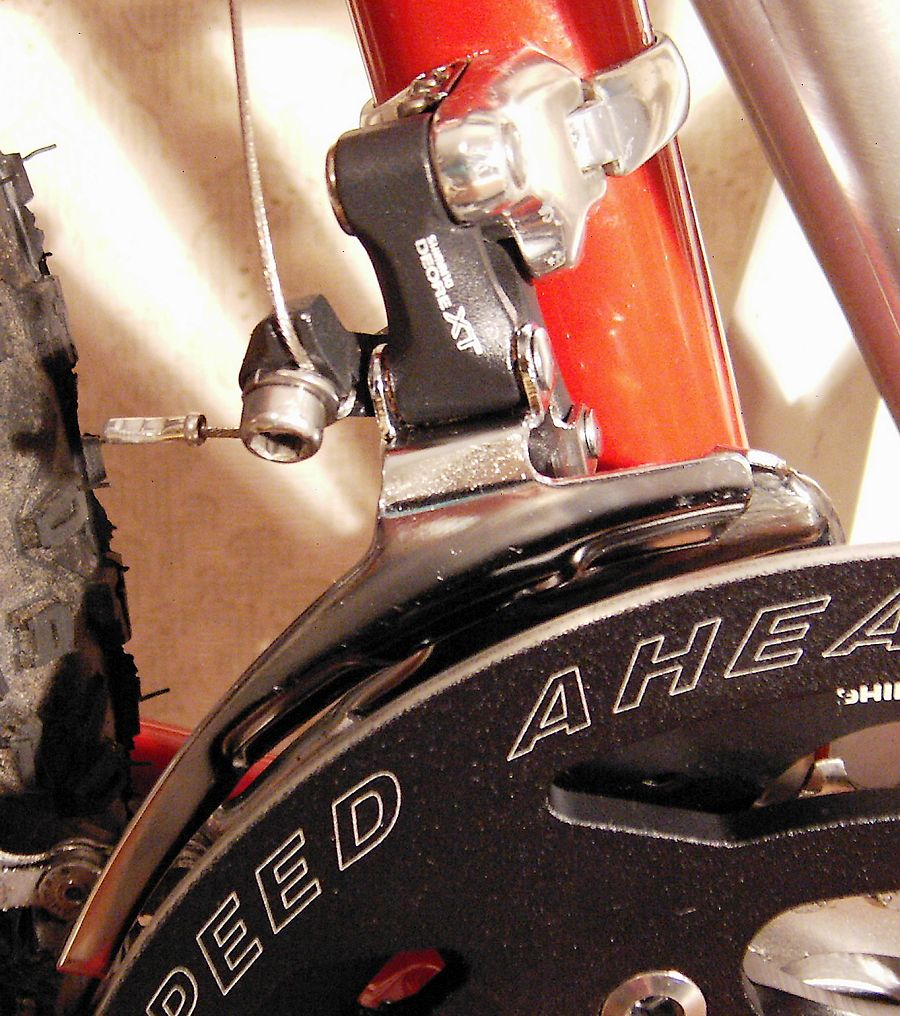
Shimano XT front derailleur (top pull, bottom swing, triple cage)

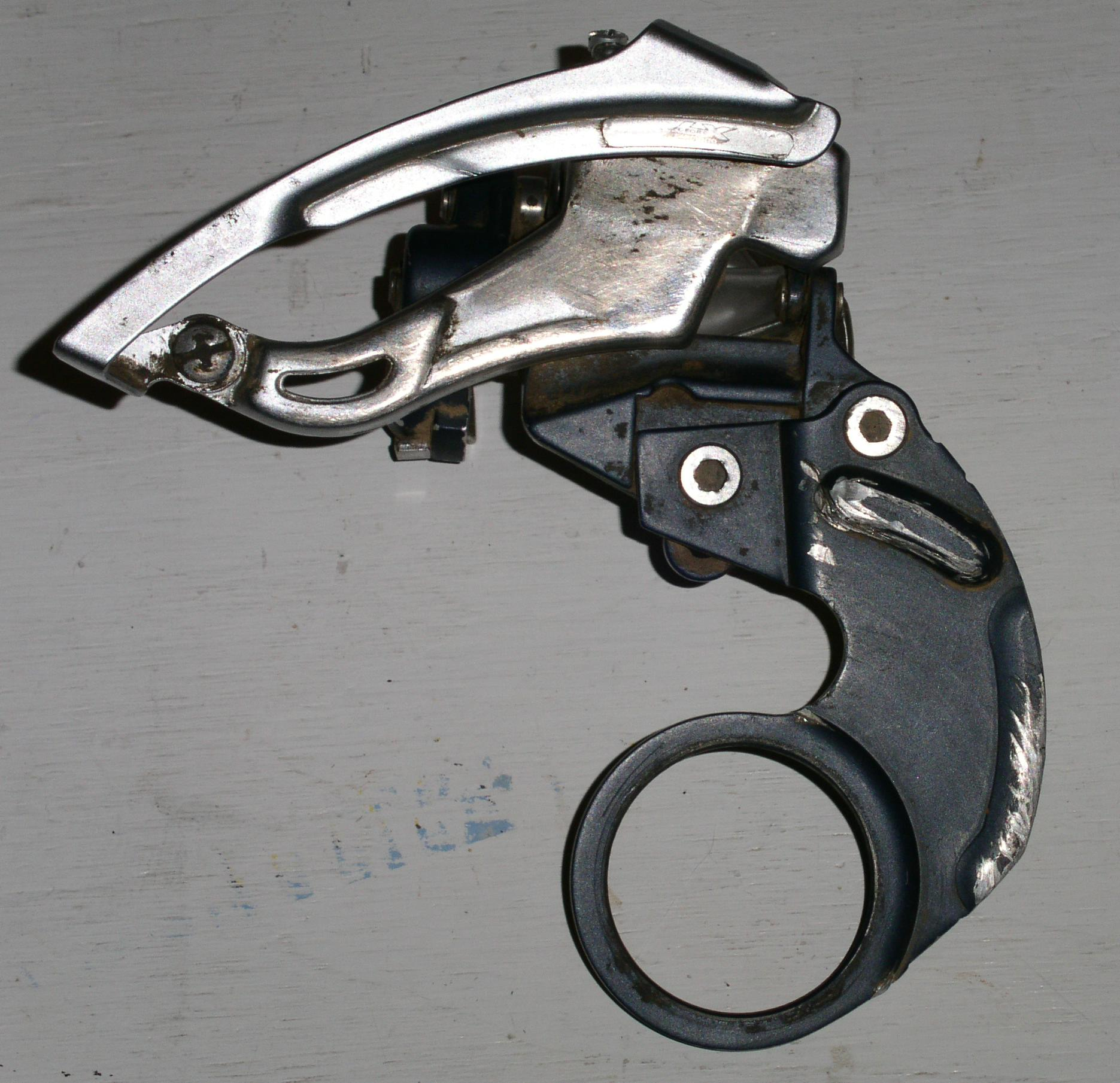
Shimano E-type front derailleur (top pull, top swing, triple cage)

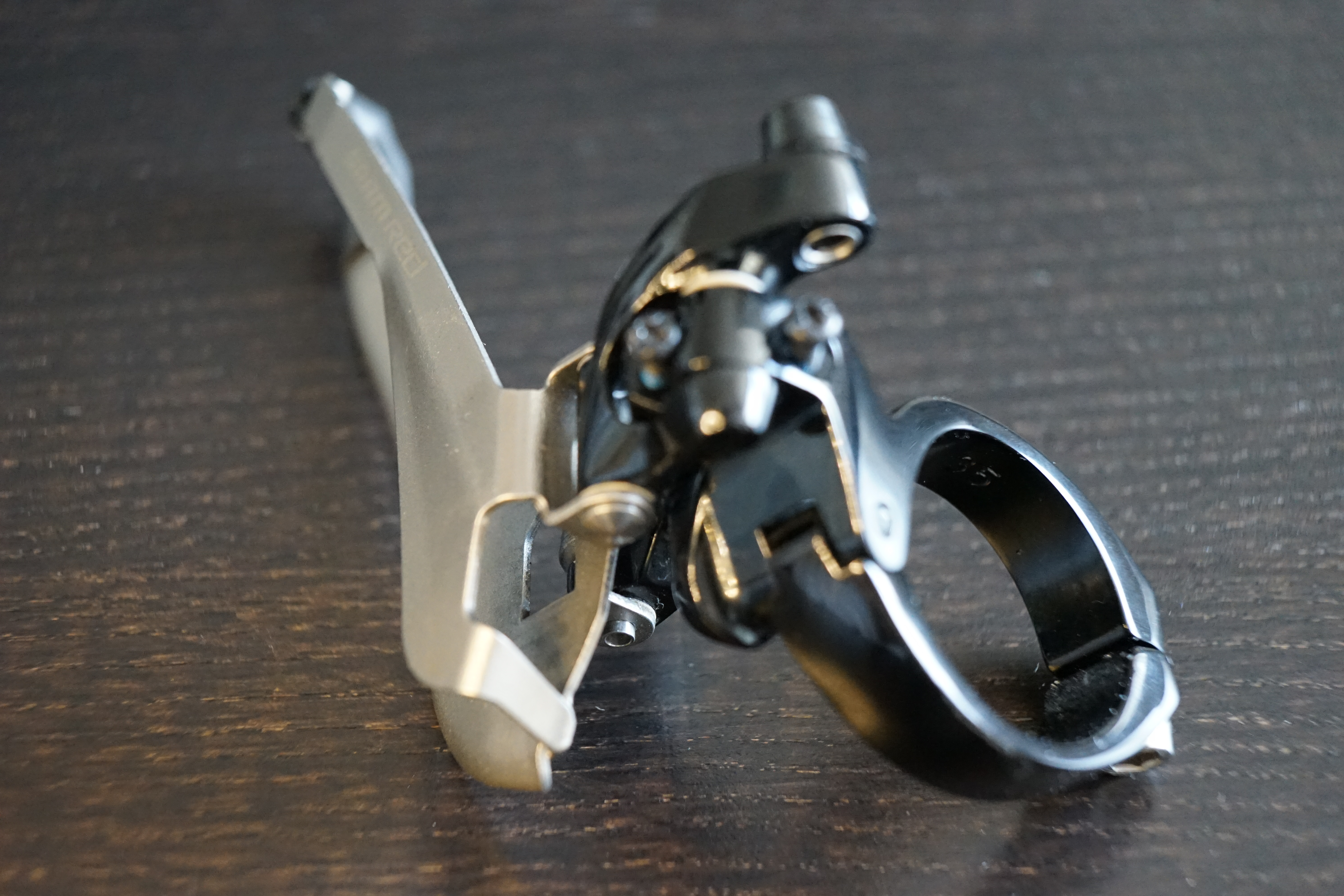
SRAM Red Black Edition front derailleur with clamp-band

The front derailleur only has to move the chain side to side between the front chainrings, but it has to do this with the top, taut portion of the chain. It also needs to accommodate large differences in chainring size: from as many as 53 teeth to as few as 20 teeth.

As with the rear derailleur, the front derailleur has a cage through which the chain passes. On a properly adjusted derailleur, the chain will only touch the cage while shifting. The cage is held in place by a movable arm which is usually implemented with a parallelogram mechanism to keep the cage properly aligned with the chain as it swings back and forth. There are usually two adjustment screws controlling the limits of lateral travel allowed. The components may be constructed of aluminium alloy, steel, plastic, or carbon fibre composite. The pivot points are usually bushings, and these will require lubrication.

Cable pull types

- Bottom pull: Commonly used on road and touring bikes, this type of derailleur is actuated by a cable pulling downwards. The cable is often routed across the top or along the bottom of the bottom bracket shell on a cable guide, which redirects the cable up the lower edge of the frame's down tube. Full-suspension mountain bikes often have bottom pull routing as the rear suspension prevents routing via the top tube.
- Top pull: This type is more commonly seen on mountain bikes without rear-suspension. The derailleur is actuated by a cable pulling upwards, which is usually routed along the frame's top tube, using cable stops and a short length of housing to change the cable's direction. This arrangement keeps the cable away from the underside of the bottom bracket/down tube which get pelted with dirt when off-road.
- Dual pull: There are some derailleurs available that have provisions for either top pull or bottom pull, and can be used in either application.

Cage types

- Double (Standard): These are intended to be used with cranksets having two chainrings. When viewed from the side of the bicycle, the inner and outer plates of the cage have roughly the same profile.
- Triple (Alpine): Derailleurs designed to be used with cranksets having three chainrings, or with two chainrings that differ greatly in size. When viewed from the side of the bicycle, the inner cage plate extends further towards the bottom bracket's center of rotation than the outer cage plate does. This is to help shift the chain from the smallest ring onto the middle ring more easily.

Swing types

- Bottom swing: The derailleur cage is mounted to the bottom of the four-bar linkage that carries it. This is the most common type of derailleur.
- Top swing: The derailleur cage is mounted to the top of the four-bar linkage that carries it. This alternate arrangement was created as a way to get the frame clamp of the derailleur closer to the bottom bracket to be able to clear larger suspension components and allow different frame shapes. The compact construction of a top swing derailleur can cause it to be less robust than its bottom swing counterpart. Top swing derailleurs are typically only used in applications where a bottom swing derailleur will not fit. An alternative solution would be to use an E-type front derailleur, which does not clamp around the seat tube at all.

Mount types

- Clamp: Until recently, most front derailleurs are mounted to the frame by a clamp around the frame's seat tube, and this style is still the standard on mountain bikes and is common on road bikes. Derailleurs are available with several different clamp diameters designed to fit different types of frame tubing. Recently, there has been a trend to make derailleurs with only one diameter clamp, and several sets of shims are included to space the clamp down to the appropriate size.
- Braze-on: An alternative to the clamp is the braze-on derailleur hanger, where the derailleur is mounted by bolting a tab on the derailleur to a corresponding tab on the frame's seat tube. This avoids any clamp size issues, but requires either a frame with the appropriate braze-on, or an adapter clamp that simulates a braze-on derailleur tab. These have become common on newer road bikes, as carbon frames no longer have a round seat tube. They are rarely seen on mountain bikes.
- E-type: This type front derailleurs do not clamp around the frame's seat tube, but instead are attached to the frame by a plate mounted under the drive side bottom bracket cup and a screw threaded into a boss on the seat tube. These derailleurs are usually found on mountain bikes with rear suspension components that do not allow space for a normal derailleur's clamp to go around the seat tube.
- DMD: Direct-Mount-Derailleur — Initiated by Specialized Bicycles, this type of derailleur is bolted directly to bosses on the chainstay of the bike. They are mostly used on dual suspension mountain bikes, where suspension movement causes changes to the chain angle as it enters the front derailleur cage. By utilizing a DMD system, the chain and derailleur move together, allowing for better shifting when the suspension is active. A DMD derailleur should not be confused with Shimano's Direct Mount, which uses a different mounting system. However, SRAM's direct mount front derailleurs are compatible with DMD, and certain Shimano E-type derailleurs can be used with DMD if the e-type plate is removed.

Because of the possibility of the chain shifting past the smallest inner chainring, especially when the inner chainring is very small, even on bikes adjusted by professional race mechanics, and the problems such misshifts can cause, a small after-market of add-on products, called chain deflectors, exists to help prevent them from occurring. Some clamp around the seat tube, below the front derailleur, and at least one attaches to the front derailleur mount.

== Use ==
Derailleurs require the chain to be in movement in order to shift from one ring or sprocket to another. This usually requires the rider to be pedalling, but some systems have been developed with the freewheel in the crankset so that the chain moves even when the rider is not pedalling. The Shimano FFS (Front Freewheel System) circa 1980 was the most widespread such system.

Chain-drive systems such as the derailleur systems work best if the chain is aligned with the sprocket plane, especially avoiding the biggest (outermost) drive sprocket running with the biggest (innermost) driven sprocket (or the smallest with the smallest, i.e. innermost with outermost). The diagonal chain run produced by these practices is less efficient and shortens the life of all components, with no advantage from the middle of the range ratio obtained.

Derailleur gears generally have an efficiency around 95%, a few percentage points higher than other gear types such as hub gears.

== See also ==
- Bicycle drivetrain systems
- Gear-changing Dimensions
- Gear inches
- Hub gear
