= Lucien Juy =

French industrialist

Lucien Charles Hippolyte Juy was a French industrialist who made derailleur gears. He is credited with making the first derailleur with a collapsible parallelogram. A hinged frame swung in and out from the frame and fed the chain to one of a number of sprockets attached to the hub. Juy's derailleurs, sold as Simplex derailleurs, were novel in having a jockey wheel to correct the tension of the chain as it moved across differently sized sprockets.

== History ==
Lucien Juy owned a bicycle shop in Dijon, Côte d'Or, France. It was there that he made the first Simplex derailleur in 1928. The bicycle historian Hilary Stone said: "It used a single pulley to tension the chain and a pair of guide plates to push the chain to each one of two sprockets. The whole arm was spring-loaded in order to tension the chain – this was the first use of the sprung top pivot which was to become an essential part of the modern indexed derailleur as we know it today. The pulley and guide plates were moved sideways on a push-rod by means of a chain pulling through the centre of the push-rod. Lucien Juy managed to persuade the management of the Alcyon racing team to fit his Le Simplex gear to their machines for the 1928 Paris–Roubaix – unfortunately the riders revolted and refused to use the new unproven gears."

By 1933 Juy claimed he was making 40,000 derailleurs a year. The derailleur was used to win four French national championships that year. His five-speed Champion du Monde model in 1936 was the first to use a chain of 3/32 rather than 1/8-inch. Antonin Magne, after whose title it was named, used the gear to win the world championship in 1936.

In 1962 Juy broke with tradition and made his front and rear derailleurs with nylon frames. A historian of bicycle derailleurs, Michael Sweatman, says: "He did not do things by halves - instead of dipping in a toe and using the odd plastic part - he jumped in up to his neck and made the entire parallelogram - both knuckles and both parallelogram plates - out of polyoxymethylene (which Du Pont branded as 'Delrin'). It was a bold, dynamic, modern and, ultimately, disastrous move." Production of all Simplex gears ended in the 1990s. A street in Dijon is named in Juy's memory.

Juy was issued 26 United States patents from 1950 to 1980, mostly for bicycle components.

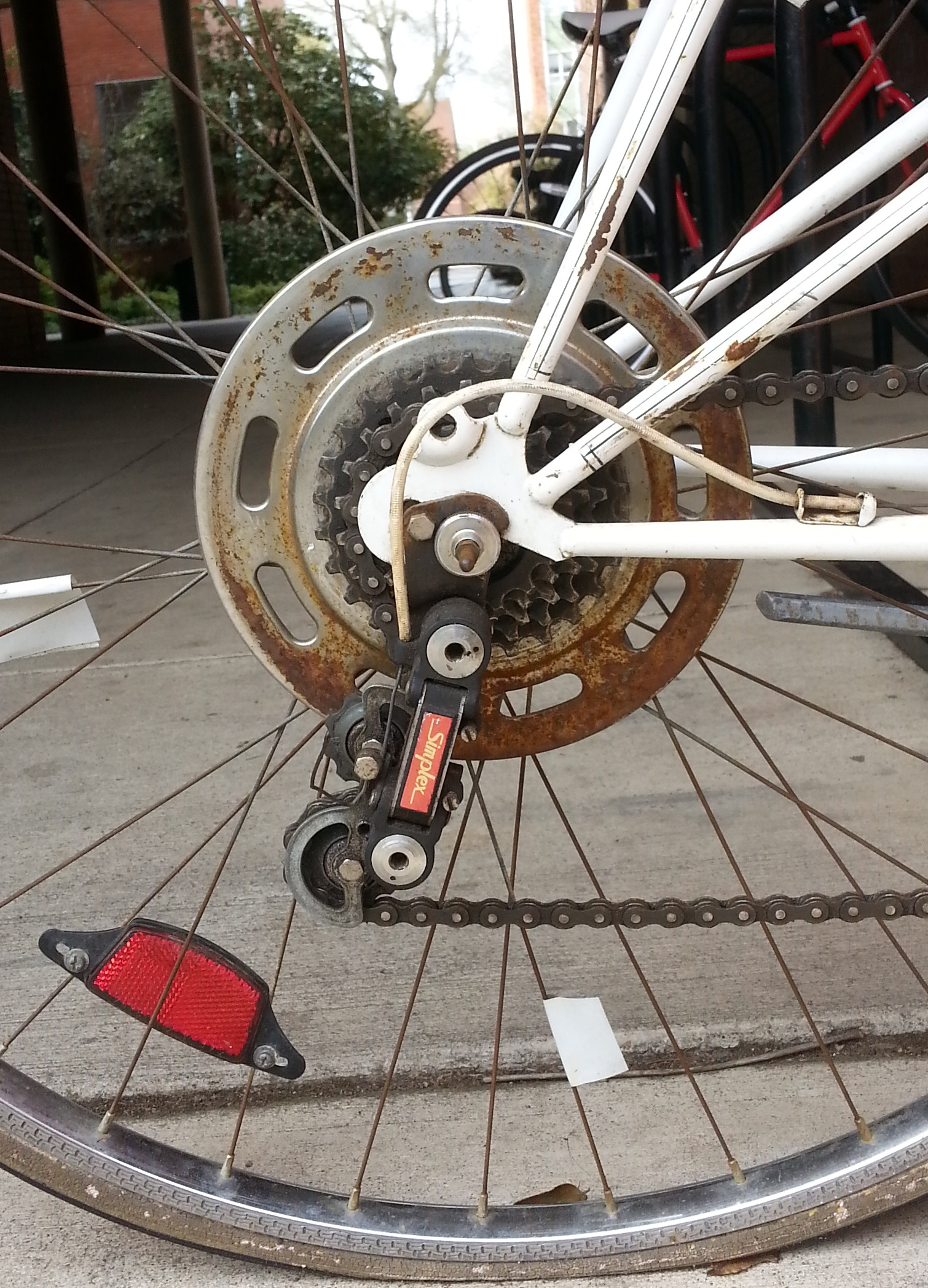
A Simplex rear derailleur, designed by Lucien Juy in France, on a 1970s-era Peugeot bicycle.
