= Selle Italia =

Selle Italia is bicycle saddle brand founded in 1897 and owned by Giuseppe Bigolin's family.

Several teams took the name Selle Italia when sponsored by the brand, including:

- GW Erco Shimano
- Selle Italia–Eurocar
- Farnese Vini-Selle Italia
- ZG Mobili-Selle Italia
- Saxon-Selle Italia

== See also ==
- Selle Royal, a company founded by Riccardo Bigolin
- Sella Italiano, a horse breed
