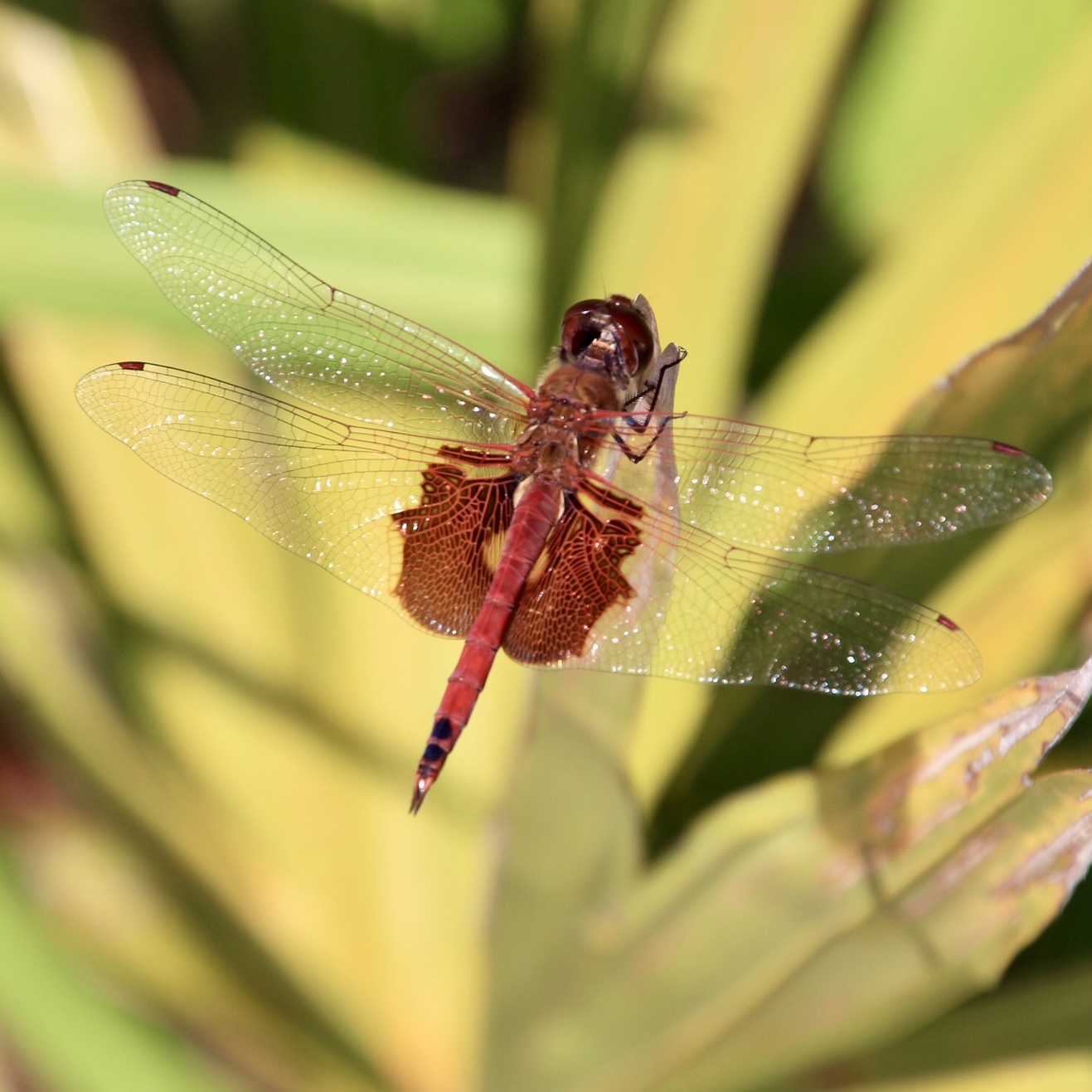

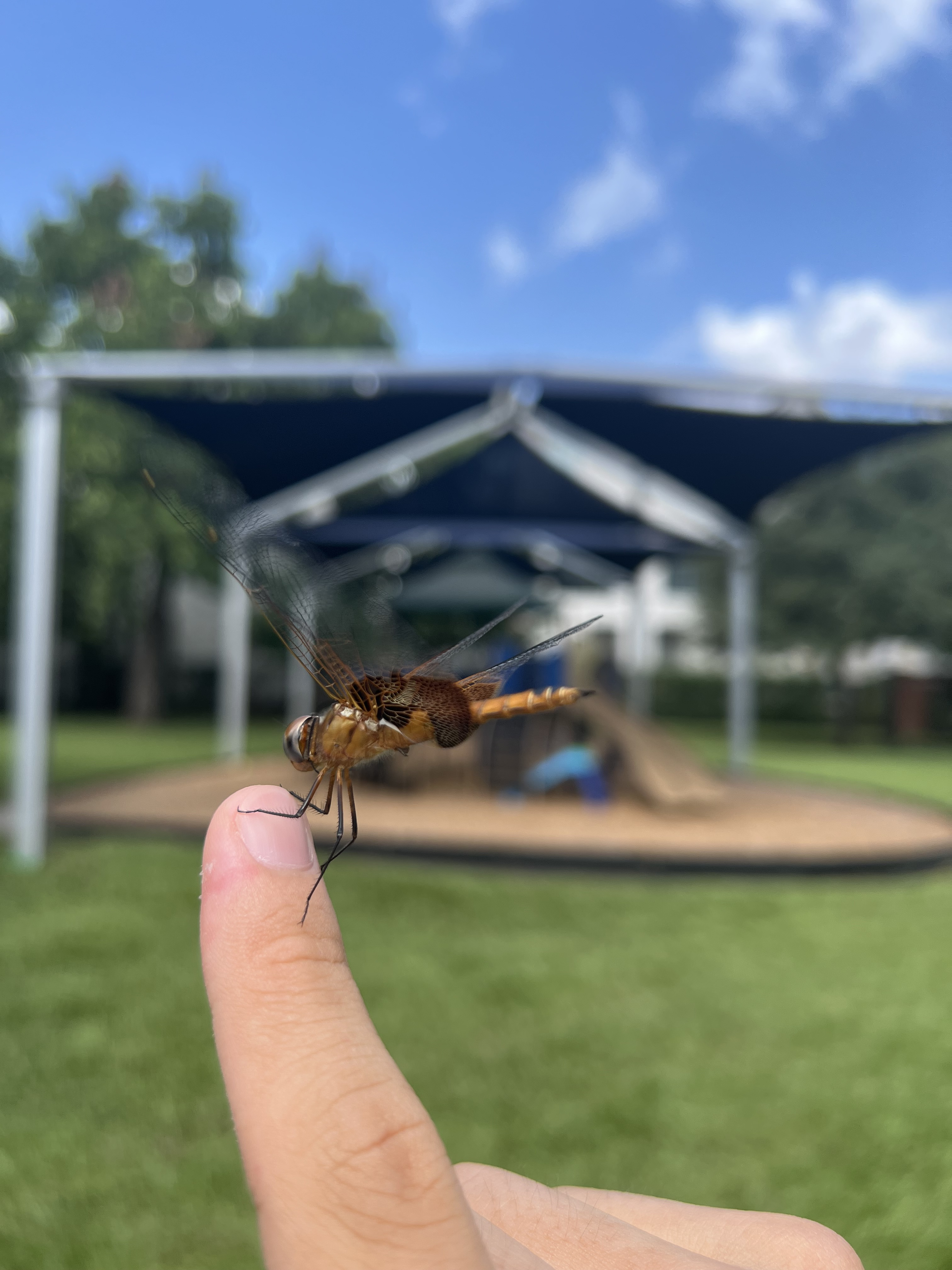

Conservation status
- Least Concern (IUCN 3.1)

Scientific classification
- Kingdom: Animalia
- Phylum: Arthropoda
- Class: Insecta
- Order: Odonata
- Infraorder: Anisoptera
- Family: Libellulidae
- Genus: Tramea
- Species: T. onusta

Binomial name
- Tramea onusta (Hagen, 1861)

= Red-mantled saddlebags =

Species of dragonfly

The red-mantled saddlebags or red saddlebags (Tramea onusta) is a species of skimmer dragonfly found in North America, Central America, and the Caribbean. It has translucent wings with red veins, and has characteristic dark red blotches at its proximal base, which makes the dragonfly look as if it is carrying saddlebags when flying. The last two bands and the cerci of these dragonflies are black.

Red saddlebags are strong, active daytime fliers that can be seen in tireless gliding flight over lawns and open areas such as parks and gardens. Their diet mainly consists of winged insects. Like their close relatives, the rainpool gliders (Pantala), saddlebag gliders have broad hindwings which are designed for hours of long distance gliding flight.

Female red-mantled saddlebags typically have bodies that are light brown or pale orange, with lighter white and brown eyes. Males have a distinctive red body color.

This dragonfly has a wide distribution across North America; it is found south of San Francisco in the west and south of the Great Lakes in the east and as far south as Nicaragua and Puerto Rico.
