= Brooks England =

Bicycle saddle manufacturer

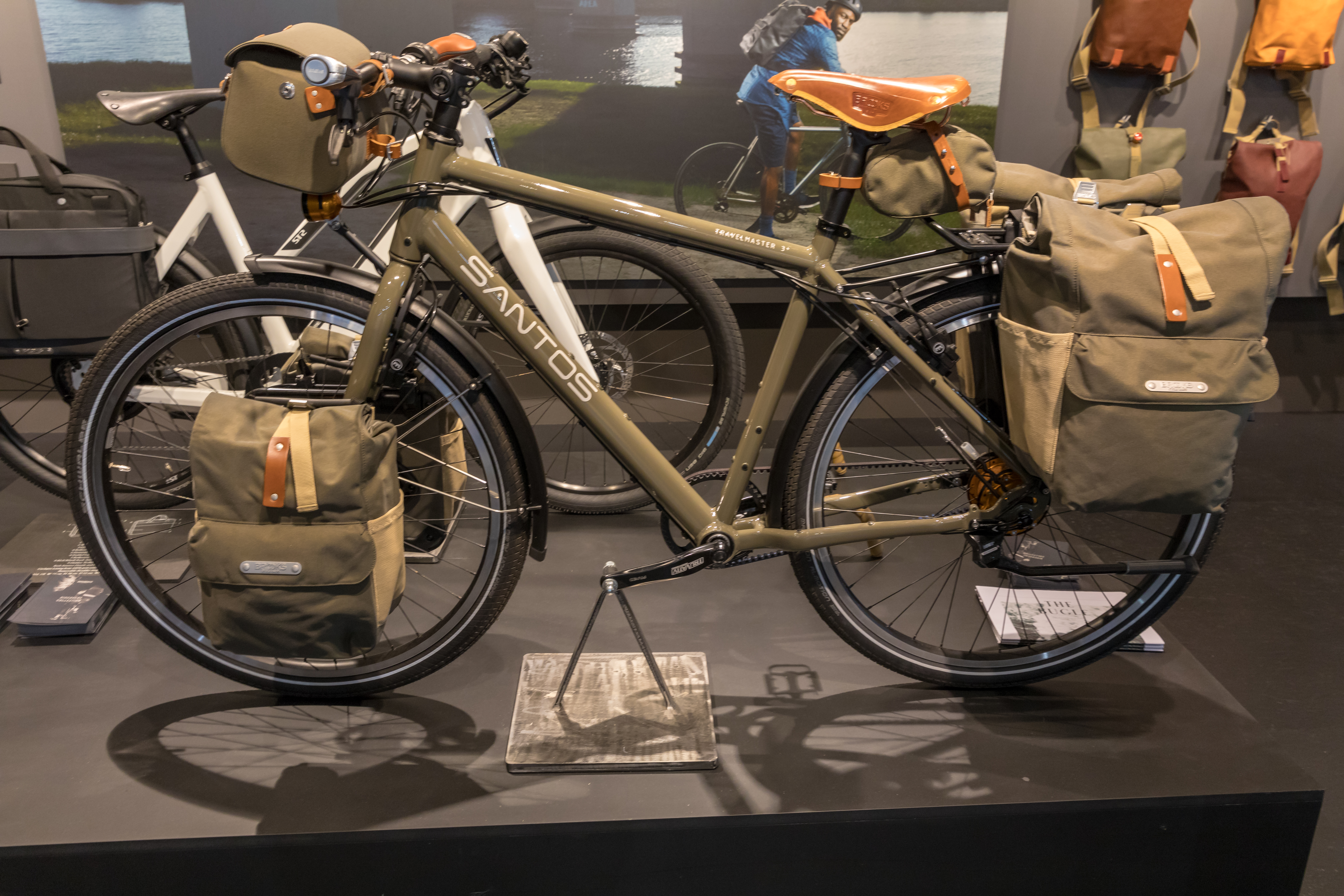
- Bicycle with Brooks saddle, handlebar ends and panniers
- Industry: Bicycle saddle manufacturer
- Area served: England
- Parent: Selle Royal group (Italy)
- Website: brooksengland.com

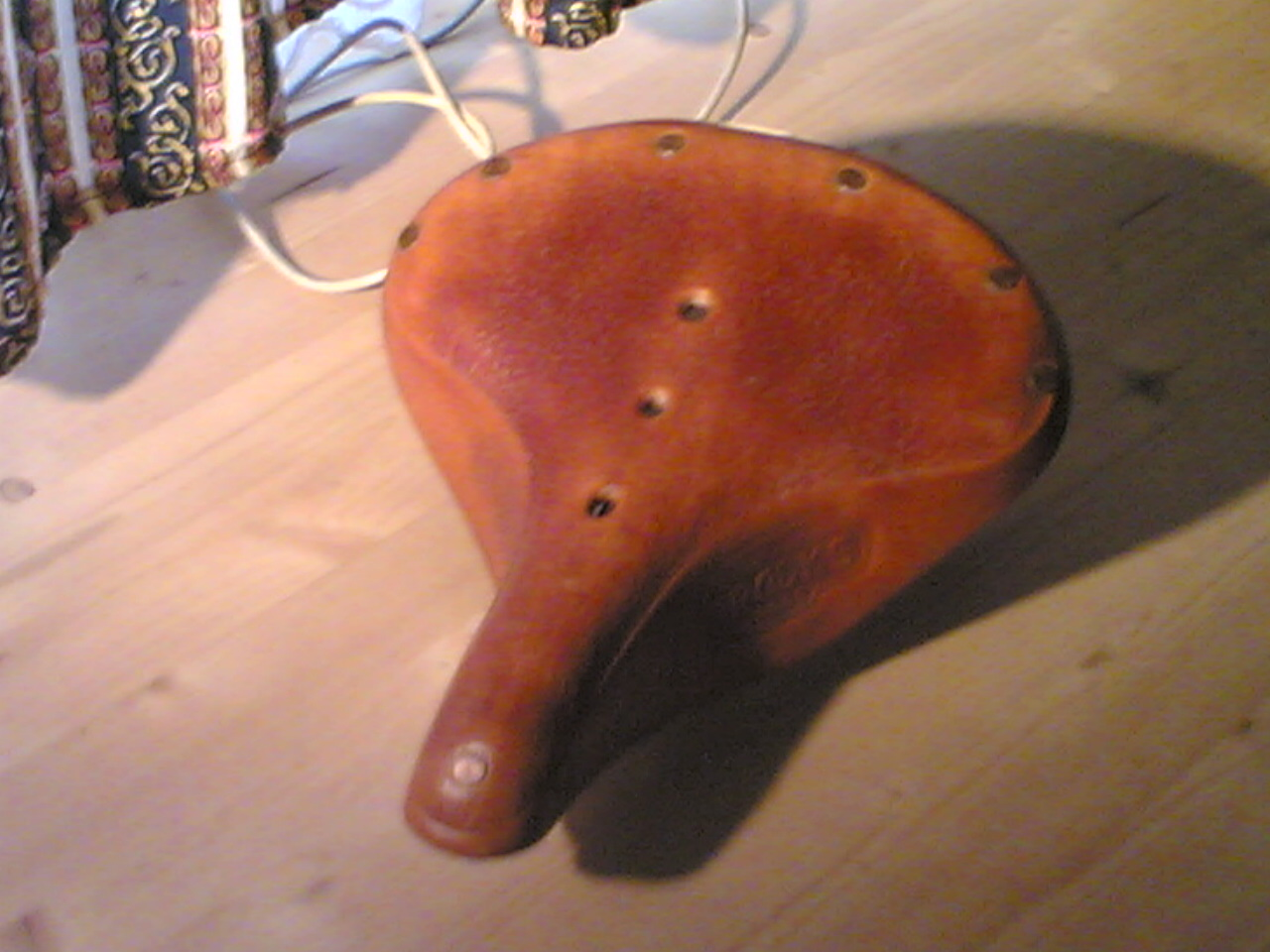
A Brooks B-67 single-rail saddle

Brooks England is a bicycle saddle manufacturer originally based in Smethwick, West Midlands, England and now owned by Selle Royal of Italy. It has been making leather goods since 1866, when it was founded in Hockley, Birmingham. In the 1880s, the production of bicycle saddles began, the first saddle patent having been filed in 1882. In a 2014 interview with Feel Desain, a Brooks spokesperson stated that according to family legend, the company began when founder John Boultbee Brooks, a horse saddle manufacturer, tried to use a bicycle after his horse died but found the wooden seat very uncomfortable. As a result, he vowed to set about solving this problem and Brooks was born.

Raleigh Bicycle Company bought Brooks in 1962. When Raleigh collapsed in 1999, Brooks was sold and subsequently went into liquidation. John Godfrey Macnaughtan and Adrian Williams were able to buy the company and keep production in England. In 2002, they sold Brooks to Selle Royal.

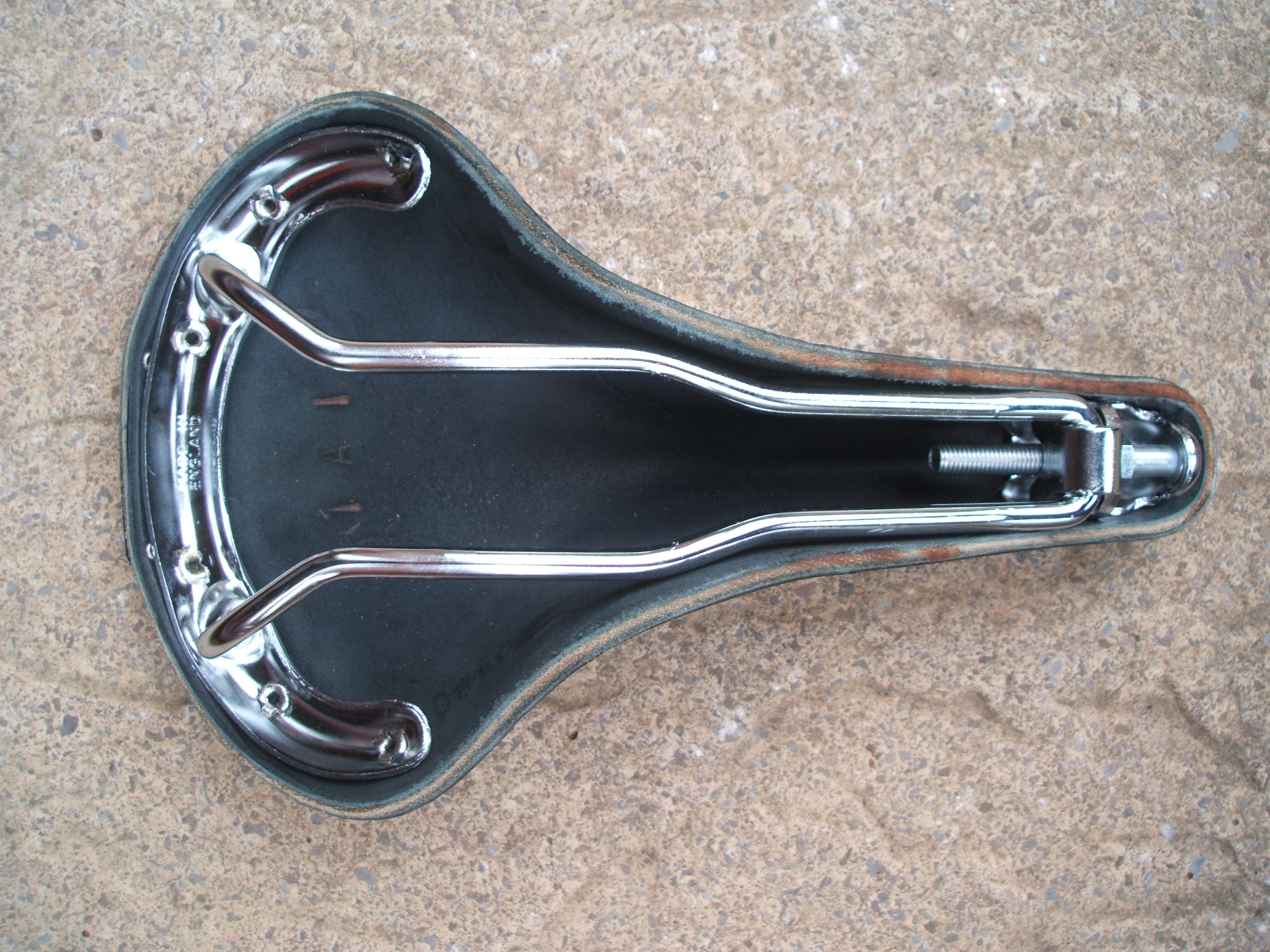
Underside of a Team Pro Classic

Leather saddles absorb and are affected by water, unlike synthetic materials. This lets them absorb and evaporate sweat instead of becoming wet, but requires care after use in wet weather. Brooks produce a dressing, Proofide, which they recommend be applied occasionally. The composition of Proofide is mainly tallow, and includes some citronella oil, which gives it a characteristic smell.

Leather saddles are two or three times heavier than plastic or carbon-fibre designs (although the titanium versions of the Team Pro, Swift and Swallow race saddles are lighter) but, for some riders, the traditional appearance and long-distance comfort make this a worthwhile trade-off.

The saddle companies Lycett and The Leatheries were taken over by Brooks. Also, Brooks were amalgamated with Wrights Saddle Co., which they eventually absorbed.
