= Selle Royal =

Italian bicycle saddle company

Coordinates: 45.6483181°N 11.6698328°E

- Type: Joint-stock company
- Industry: Bicycle saddle manufacturer
- Founded: 1956; 70 years ago
- Founder: Riccardo Bigolin
- Headquarters: Pozzoleone, Italy
- Area served: Worldwide
- Key people: Barbara Bigolin
- Products: Saddles for bicycles
- Revenue: EUR 100 million (2012)
- Website: selleroyal.com

Selle Royal Spa is a company from Vicenza, Italy, founded in 1956 by Riccardo Bigolin, producing saddles for bicycles. In 1965, a formal establishment of Selle Royal Sp.A. was made in Vicenza for the production and distribution of bicycle saddles. Polyurethane foaming production system was chosen in order to be able to maximize production across the chain. Selle Royal then released the first patent of vacuum technology for ergonomic shaped design production.

In the 90's, Selle Royal Sp.A. developed and patented a revolutionary "soft-solid" material named as Royalgel. Royalgel claims to be the only saddle gel that doesn't age, harden, or migrate, delivering unbeatable comfort and durability.

With the 2010 acquisition of China's Justek, Selle Royal Spa was stated to be the world's largest manufacturer of bicycle saddles.

== History ==
- 1956: Riccardo Bigolin founded Selle Royal
- 1967: Riccardo Bigolin (with Feltrificio Bassanese) and his brother Giuseppe Bigolin acquired Selle Italia srl (founded in 1897); Riccardo later ceded its 50 % share to Giuseppe Bigolin and his wife
- 1970: Selle Royal develops a production technology based on a particular polyurethane foam
- 1980s - 1990s: Selle Royal Spa has become a partner of the main houses that produce bicycles.
- 1980: Selle Royal develops the RVS, an automated vacuum production system, which allows the saddle to be joined directly to the foam
- 1990: Selle Royal develops a gel for the saddle for the recreational market, based on an exclusive polyurethane gel patented by Bayer
- 1996: Selle Royal opens Selle Bra for production in Brazil
- 1997: Selle Royal launches Fi'zi:k
- 2002: Selle Royal acquires Brooks England, thus giving the company three independent brands of saddles
- 2005: Selle Bra and Metal Ciclo merge to form Royal Ciclo
- 2006 - 2010: Selle Royal began direct distribution through dealers H2 (USA) with Continental Tyres and A4, (Italy and France, Austria since 2018) of proprietary and thirdy brands.
- 2007: Selle Royal acquires Crankbrothers
- 2010: Selle Royal acquires 52% of Justek, China
- 2011: Selle Royal acquired PEdAL ED, operating under Via Vittorio Emanuele 119 - 36050 Pozzoleone (VI), ITALY - P.IVA. 04013940244 since 2016
- 2013: Brooks England purchased Pannier ltd.
- 2015: Justek became Selle Royal China Vehicle, with two production sites (Jiangyin and Tianjin)
- 2016: Opening of SR56 Inc, a R&D Center in Ogden, Utah

== See also ==
- List of bicycle parts
- List of Italian companies
- Colnago
