= Curve Creative Studio =

Italian marketing company

- Type: Private
- Industry: Marketing, advertising, branding
- Founded: 2012
- Founders: Giovanni Sgro; Luciano Aiello; Marco Gallo
- Number of locations: Turin, Italy; New York City, United States; Las Vegas, United States
- Area served: Worldwide
- Services: Strategy, creativity & brand development

Curve Creative Studio is a creative communications, marketing and branding agency based in Turin, Italy.

== History ==
Curve Creative Studio was founded by Giovanni Sgro, Luciano Aiello, and Marco Gallo, who all returned from working abroad in the United States, Australia and Brazil respectively to open the agency. After spending some time working from one of their homes, they then moved to an office in the centre of Turin. The agency celebrated its third anniversary in July 2015. In the same year, Giovanni left the company, which remained under the leadership of Luciano Aiello and Marco Gallo. Since 2015, Curve Studio has created a Digital Division - Curve Digital Studio - specialized in augmented reality and virtual reality.

== Notable campaigns ==
The agency has worked on campaigns for a number of clients in different sectors. In 2013, Curve Creative Studio worked on a campaign for Martini & Rossi’s 150th Anniversary, for which it collaborated with artist Kurt Perschke, who was working on his RedBall project at the time. Curve Studio has worked with Uber, Ferrero, Airbnb, FCA Italy, Esselunga, Lavazza, Facebook Italy, Meta (for the Binario F project), Italo, Compagnia di San Paolo and Museum Card Association Abbonamento Musei Piemonte Torino. Through Uber, the agency has also collaborated with AS Roma and Como Calcio.

Since 2017, the agency has collaborated with Italian brand Molecola and designed the new bottle Molecola 90-60-90, the first 100% cola of Italy. The characteristics of the product are inspired by classic elements of Italian culture, fashion, style and screen divas such as Sophia Loren. The resulting bottle is a seductive shape with a woven texture, imprinted into the glass, reminiscent of a high fashion dress. Among the others, in 2018 the project won two International Design Awards (IDA) Gold Prizes in Los Angeles.

Since 2020, Curve Creative Studio has been Uber’s reference agency in Italy, developing national campaigns across the country. One of the most recognized projects was the anamorphic billboard installation at Rome’s Fiumicino Airport and Termini Station, launched as part of the creative campaign.

Since 2023, the agency has managed the social media presence of the Lavazza Museum in Turin, located in the company’s new headquarters, considered a key cultural and branding asset for Lavazza.

== Side project ==
=== Feel Desain ===
Curve Studio has its side project Feel Desain, an online magazine that offers every day a fresh insight into the emerging design scenario including innovation, product design, fashion, graphics, art and so much more. The paper magazine was released in 2014, while the second issue in May 2018 on the occasion of Forward Festivals in Munich, Germany.

=== The Torineser ===
Among Curve Creative Studio’s independent initiatives is The Torineser, a visual editorial project inspired by the French initiative The Parisianer. Launched in 2021, The Torineser explores the city of Turin through a series of monthly illustrated covers that reinterpret its architecture, atmosphere, and cultural identity. Though not an actual magazine, the project acts as an ongoing artistic and cultural narrative of the city.

Over time, The Torineser has evolved from a creative experiment into a recognized cultural project, with collaborations, special editions, and installations in public spaces such as old, disused newsstands. It has also been featured at major events like the Turin International Book Fair. As noted by Corriere della Sera, it is "an imaginary magazine that is becoming a business".
