= Saddlebag =

Bag attached to a saddle

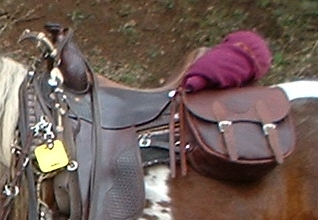
Saddlebags on a Western saddle

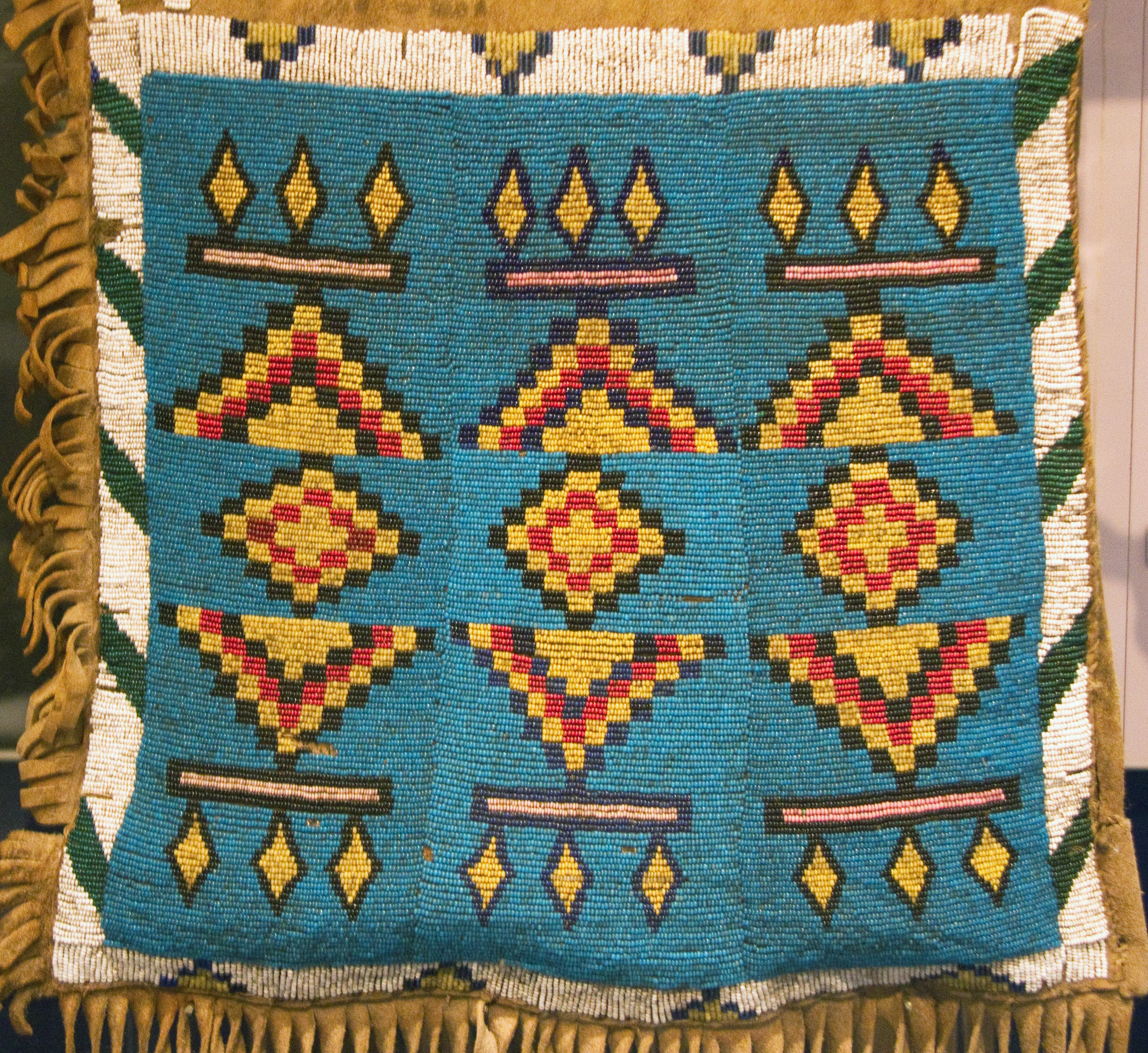
Traditional Blackfoot women's saddlebag

Saddlebags are bags that are attached to saddles.

== Horse riding ==
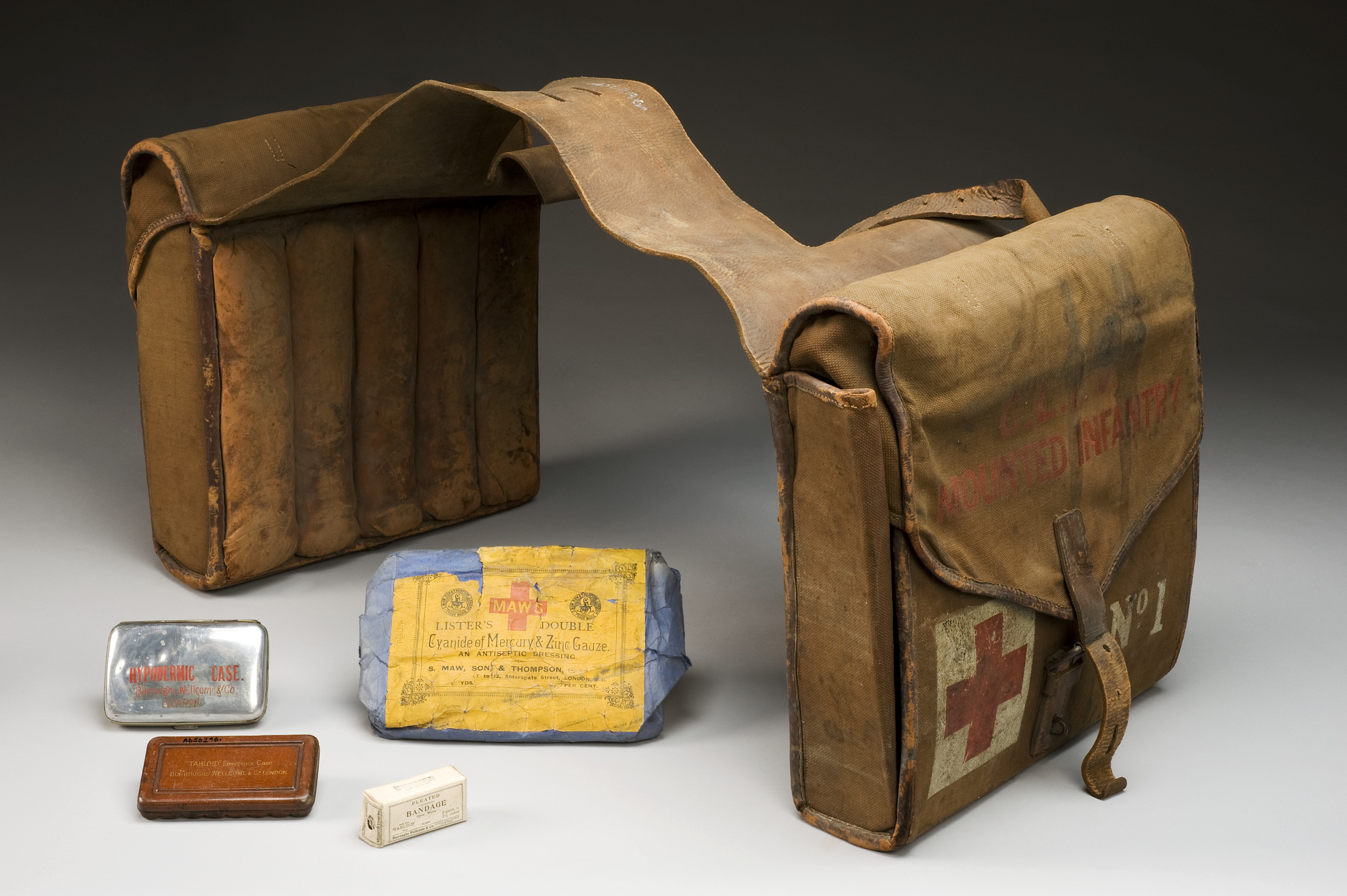
World War I pannier-style saddlebags containing a first aid kit

In horse riding, saddlebags sit in various positions, on the back, side, or front of the saddle. Most attach to the saddle by straps and ties. They can be made from various materials. Although leather was the traditional material, it is heavier and requires more maintenance than many modern versions. There are several types: Pommel bags (which sit in front of the saddle), traditional paired saddlebags (which lie on the hips of the horse, on either side of the cantle), and assorted smaller bags such as a cantle bag (a small tube-like bag that sits just behind the saddle), or a single small saddle bag that may be carried on the off-side (right hand side) of an English saddle.

== Indigenous Background ==
The saddle bag was created by the Pikini Blackfeet tribe and White Mountain Apache. Those same groups, plus the tribes it was carried through, used the saddle bags. They started being created sometime in the early 1800s. These saddle bags were used for transportation of medicines and drugs, and to hold their belongings.Saddle bags were typically made of hide, specifically from buffalo.

== Pack animal ==
Pannier-style bags are sometimes fitted over a pack saddle used for packing gear on a horse or other pack animal (often, a mule or donkey) rather than for carrying a rider. In Turkish Anatolia, Iran and Baluchistan, saddlebags are traditionally woven in wool, with a front face decorated with Soumak and a plainer flatwoven back. Slits are left along the opening for a rope to close and secure the bag to the pack animal.

== Bicycle ==
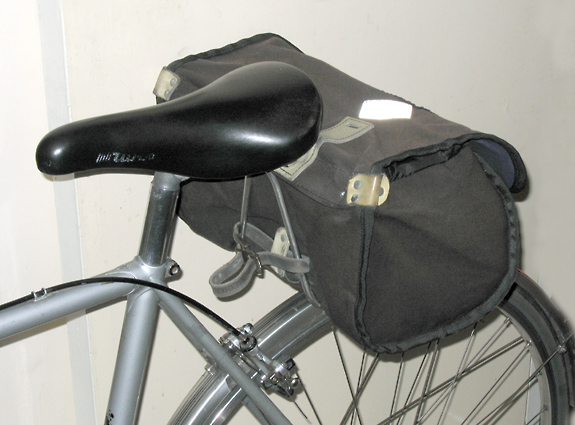
Bicycle saddlebag

In bicycling, a saddlebag or seat bag is a bag attached under the saddle or seat. Smaller bags are typically used to hold a few items such as spare inner tubes, puncture repair kit, tools, rain gear, food, first-aid kit, etc. Seat bags are common on touring bicycles, racing bicycles, and cross country mountain bikes.

Bags range from tiny to large (over 25 liters). Smaller bags, known as seat bags, wedge packs, or seat packs fit completely under the saddle. Larger bags which project behind and sideways are usually called saddlebags; a well-known example is the Carradice Long Flap, for many years a staple of British cycle tourists especially on the weekends.

Recumbent bicycles have much larger seats than the saddle of a conventional bicycle, and special bags are available which attach to the seat; these are also called seat bags but are typically the size of small touring panniers.

== Motorcycle ==
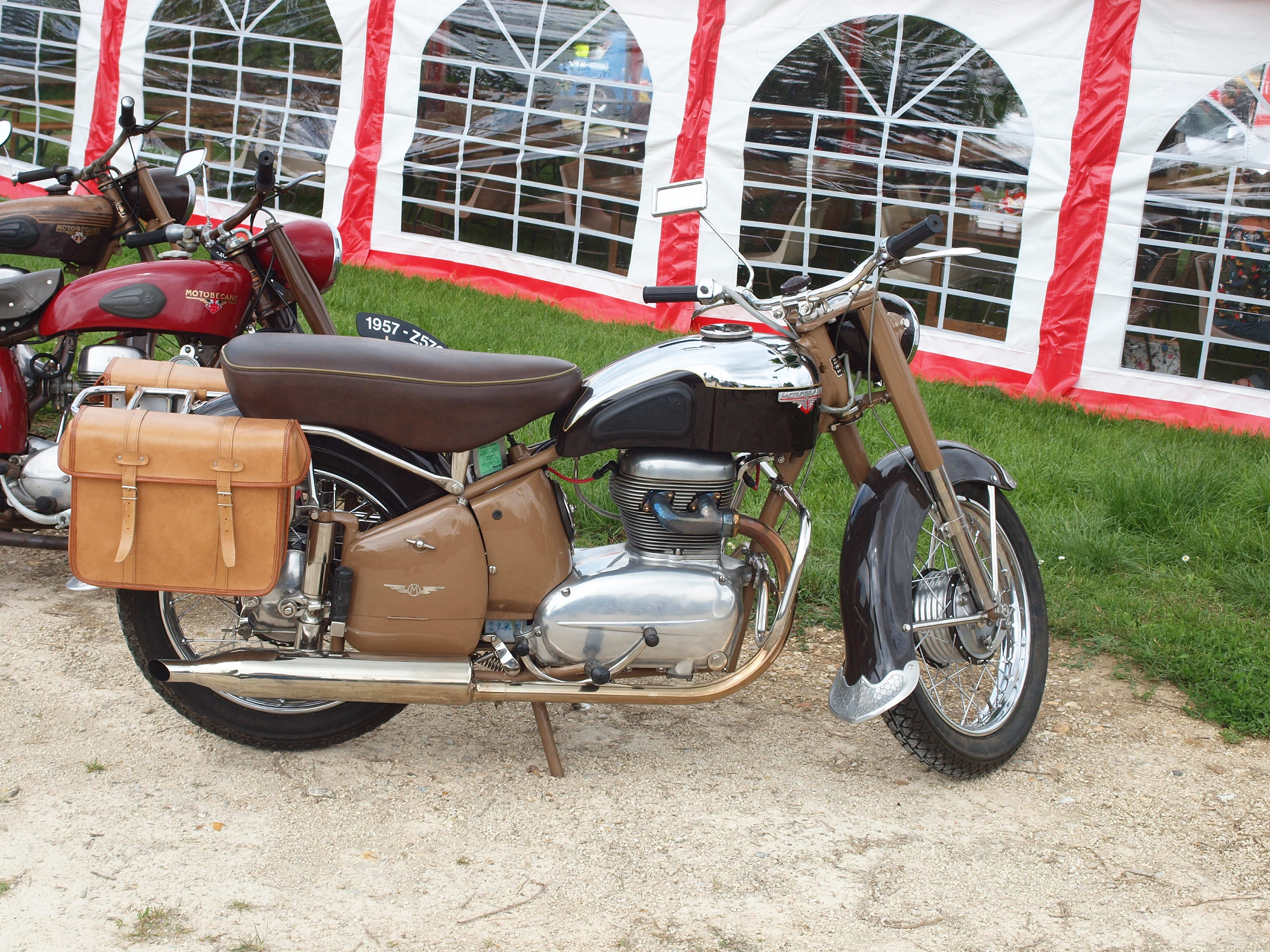
A vintage motorcycle equipped with saddlebags.

On a motorcycle, modern panniers are normally hard-shell cases mounted behind the seat and on either-side of the rear wheel, attached to a framework (which bolts to the motorcycle frame) known as a carrier. Modern panniers are made to be quickly-detachable.

Historically, the origins were in military use for despatch riders, where soft, often canvas-type woven material bags were fitted to the motorcycle by rudimentary frames enabling the rider to carry documents securely. After hostilities ended, any left-over items including the motorcycles could be obtained from army-surplus depots, particularly after World War II during the 1950s when there was an increase in motorcycle use as a cheap form of transport.

Saddlebags also are available as modern motorcycle accessories (similar to western saddlebags described above) to place across the rear portion of the motorcycle seat, making them quickly detachable. They can then be carried over the arm or shoulder of the rider.

Made of leather or vinyl (leathercloth or imitation leather) with stiffening, they are known as Throwovers and come in different shapes and sizes to be used as travel luggage or a handy temporary container for items such as shopping.

== See also ==
- Outline of cycling
- Pannier
- Saddlebag, 2000 novel by Bahiyyih Nakhjavani
