= Seatpost =

Tube that extends upwards from the bicycle frame to the saddle

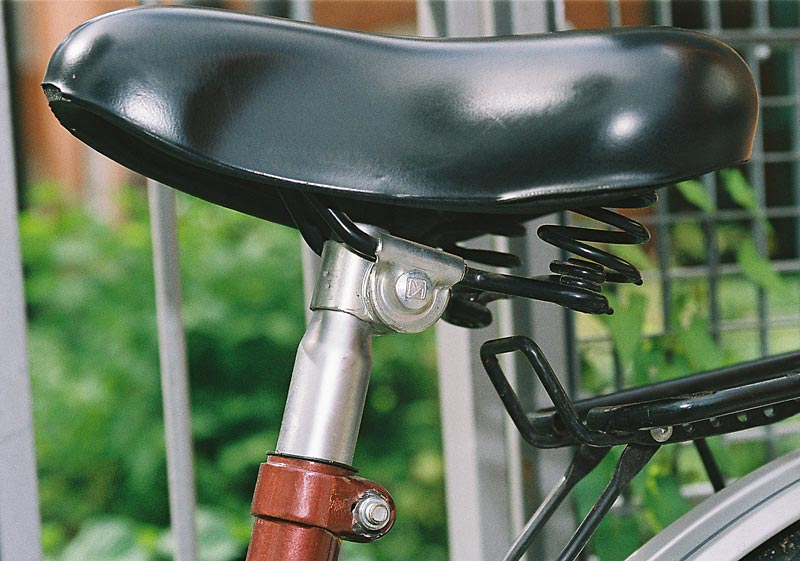
A "plain" seatpost (silver) connects the saddle to the frame (red).

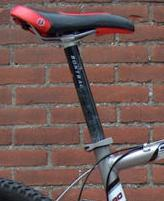
A microadjust seatpost (black) of a Trek Fuel 80 mountain bike.

A seatpost with a significant setback on a BMX bike.

A bicycle seatpost/seat post, seatpin, saddlepole, saddle pillar, or saddle pin is a tube that extends upwards from the bicycle frame to the saddle. The amount that it extends out of the frame can usually be adjusted, and there is usually a mark that indicates the minimum insertion (or maximum extension). Seatposts can be made of steel, aluminum, titanium, carbon fiber, or aluminum wrapped in carbon fiber.

== Attachment points ==
Seatposts generally clamp directly onto saddle rails with which they must be compatible, while old or inexpensive seatposts slide into a separate clamp that then clamps the saddle rails.

To attach it to the bicycle's main frame, the seatpost is inserted into the seat tube, which must be of a very slightly larger diameter (or a cylindrical shim can be used). The seatpost is held in place by squeezing the top of the seat tube with a tightening ring (temporarily reducing its diameter; a vertical slit cut into the tube allows this to happen without crumpling) until the tube firmly hugs the post where it leaves the frame. A hole for a pinch bolt (also known as a "binder bolt") may be built into the frame for this purpose, or a "seatpost clamp" may be purchased separately (but must be sized to closely fit the diameter of the seat tube). Whether integrated or separate, the seatpost bolt can have a simple nut, can be an Allen bolt, or can include a quick-release mechanism, with a handle that releases the clamp without tools. A quick-release allows easy height adjustment of the seat, though increases the risk of seat theft unless it is also used to detach the seat when parking.

== Sizes ==
The size of the seatpost is dependent upon the internal dimensions of the seat tube of the bicycle frame. They come in various diameters, lengths and offsets. Offset is the distance between the centerline of the seatpost tube, and the centerline of the clamp area. Shims are often available to adapt a too-small seatpost to a too-large seat tube.

=== Diameters ===
Seatpost diameters generally range from 22 mm to 35 mm in 0.2 mm increments. The most common size is 27.2 mm (1.07 in) for most bikes, especially for the higher-quality models. BMX bikes commonly use 25.4 mm seatposts. In some modern bikes with thicker alloy or carbon tubing, larger diameters such as 30.9 mm are used. Tapering seatposts often have a diameter of 22.2 mm (7/8 in) at the top. Folding bicycles often have the seat post diameter of 33.9 mm.

Sheldon Brown collected and published a list of seatpost diameters on his website, evidence of the common problem of finding compatible replacements.

=== Length ===
Lengths range from 75 mm to 430 mm. Mountain bike seatposts tend to be longer than road bicycle seatposts.

=== Offset or layback ===
Offset or "layback" can range from 0 mm to 45 mm. A seatpost with offset is necessary when the seat tube angle of the frame is too steep to give the desired saddle setback (the horizontal distance between a plumb line hung from the nose of the saddle and the bottom bracket spindle). Conversely, an "in line" post may be required if the seat tube angle is too slack. Some saddles, notably Brooks leather saddles, have relatively short rails, allowing less adjustment of setback, and changing the seatpost or inserting a saddle adjuster may be the only way to achieve the correct position.

== Types ==
=== Plain ===
This type, usually found on older bikes, less expensive bikes, or kids bikes, consists of a tube which may decrease in diameter for the last inch or so (2.54 cm) and a separate clamping mechanism at the top. One bolt tightens the clamp to the rest of the seatpost and to the saddle rails at the same time.

=== Micro-adjustable ===
They can be divided into two types; ones which can adjust the saddle angle continuously, and ones in which the saddle angle can only be adjusted to a certain number of positions.

=== Integrated ===
Some high end road and track bicycle frames are made from one piece of molded carbon fiber with an integrated seatpost that is cut to length depending upon the rider, also known as a seat mast. The advantage is that it is lighter, can be molded into an aerodynamic shape, and removes the need to clamp an irregular tube shape. The disadvantage of this setup is that the seatpost height is not as adjustable. There is usually 2-3 centimeters of adjustment with the clamping device.

=== Aero ===
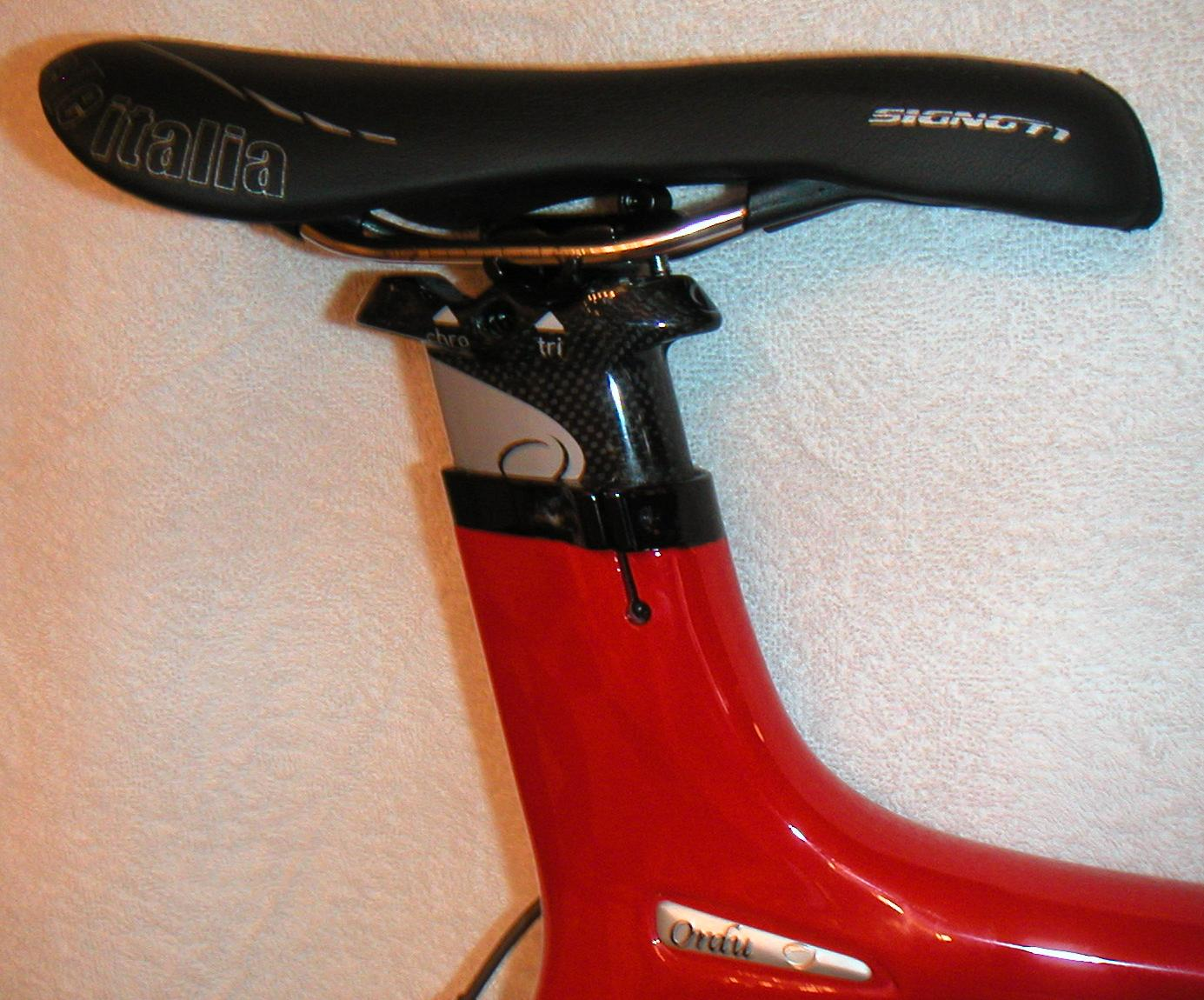
An aero seatpost in an aero seat tube held with two pinch bolts on an Orbea Ordu.

As alternatives to the integrated seatpost mentioned above, some seatposts merely have an aerodynamic shape that either matches the shape of the aero seat tube or is only not round above a certain point. In the case of aero seat tubes, there are a variety of clamping mechanisms for such seatposts that include pinch bolts and wedges. Aero seatposts are typically proprietary designs for a specific frame model and thus cannot be mounted on bikes of other manufacturers.

=== Suspension ===
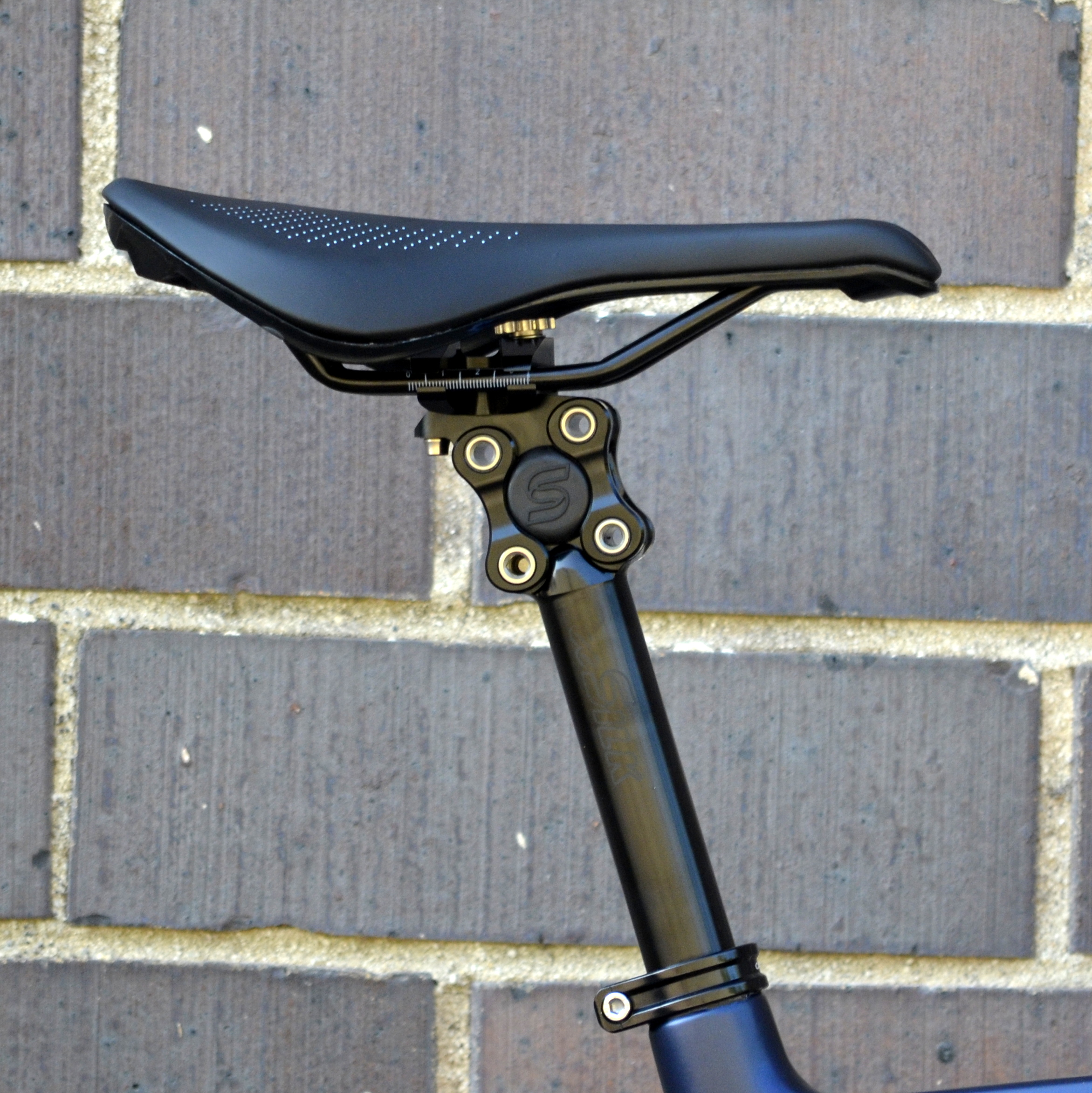
Suspension seatpost (parallelogram type).

Suspension seatposts allow the saddle to move up and down with either a telescoping or parallelogram mechanism and incorporate a spring, an elastomer, or compressed air and possibly a damper to insulate against bumps. The preload of the spring may be adjustable. These seatposts are most common on hybrid and mountain bikes. Suspension seatposts usually come in fewer diameters, and shims are more likely to be necessary.

=== Pivotal ===
Pivotal seatposts are common on BMX bikes. They have a concave semicircle of ridges at their top that matches the convex semicircle of ridges on the bottom of a pivotal saddle. The two semicircles are held together with a bolt to attach the saddle to the seatpost. Pivotal seatposts are currently expanding rapidly in popularity with mountain bikes.

=== Seatmast and cap ===
Some bikes, such as Trek Madones, provide saddle height adjustment with a seatmast and cap arrangement. The seatmast is an extension of the seat tube above the top tube, and the cap slides into it, clamps in place, and attaches to the saddle.

=== Dropper ===
Dropper seatposts (also known as dropper posts or droppers) on mountain and gravel bikes can be remotely adjusted while riding using a lever or switch on the handlebar. This can be used to quickly lower the saddle and position it out of the way to allow for better body positioning and maneuverability on technical sections. The same lever or switch can then be used to return the saddle to its normal position for better pedaling efficiency. Most dropper seatposts use a hydraulically damped air or coil spring with cable, hydraulic, or electronic actuation.

Matej Mohorič used a dropper seatpost on his road bike to help him win the 2022 Milan–San Remo one-day race.

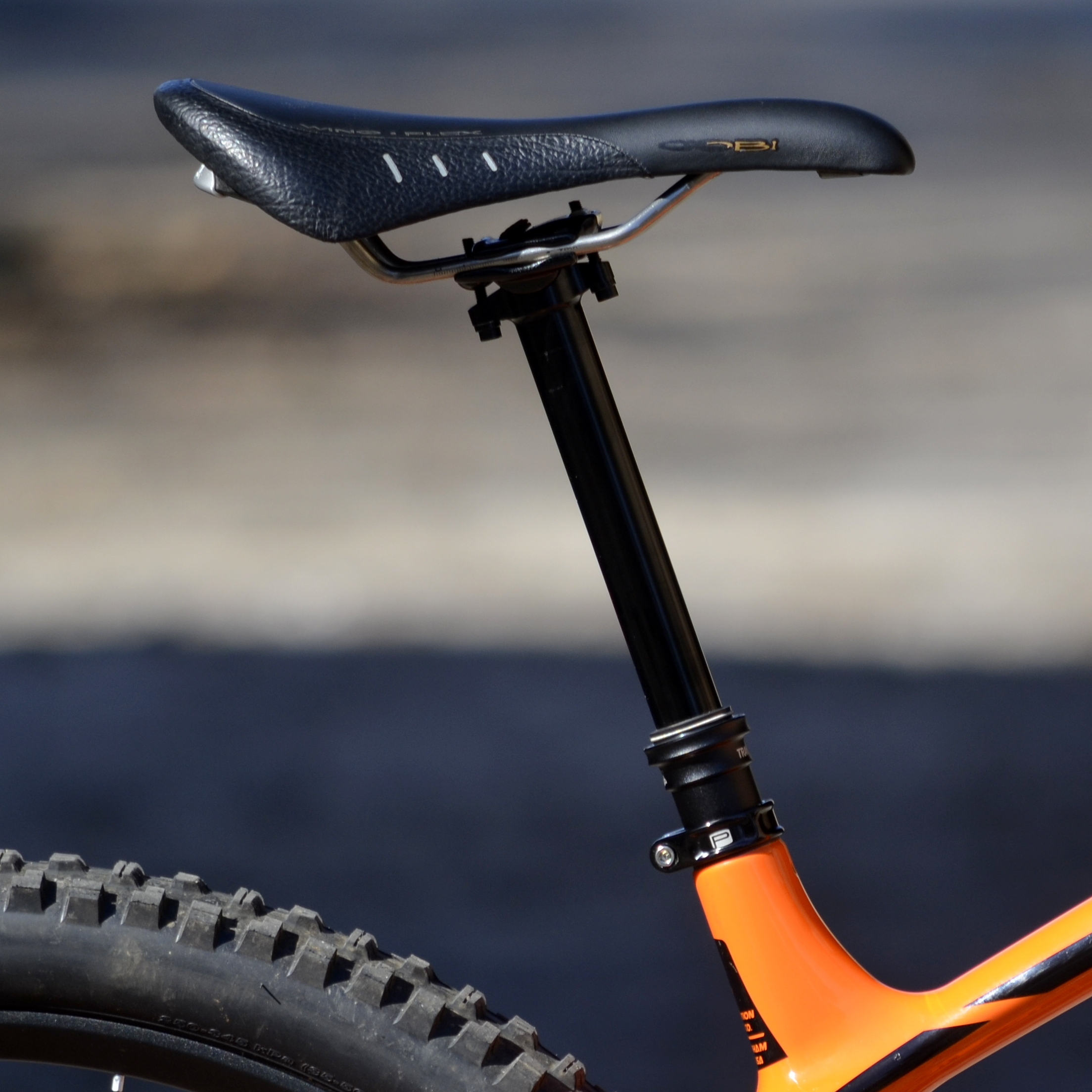
Extended dropper post.

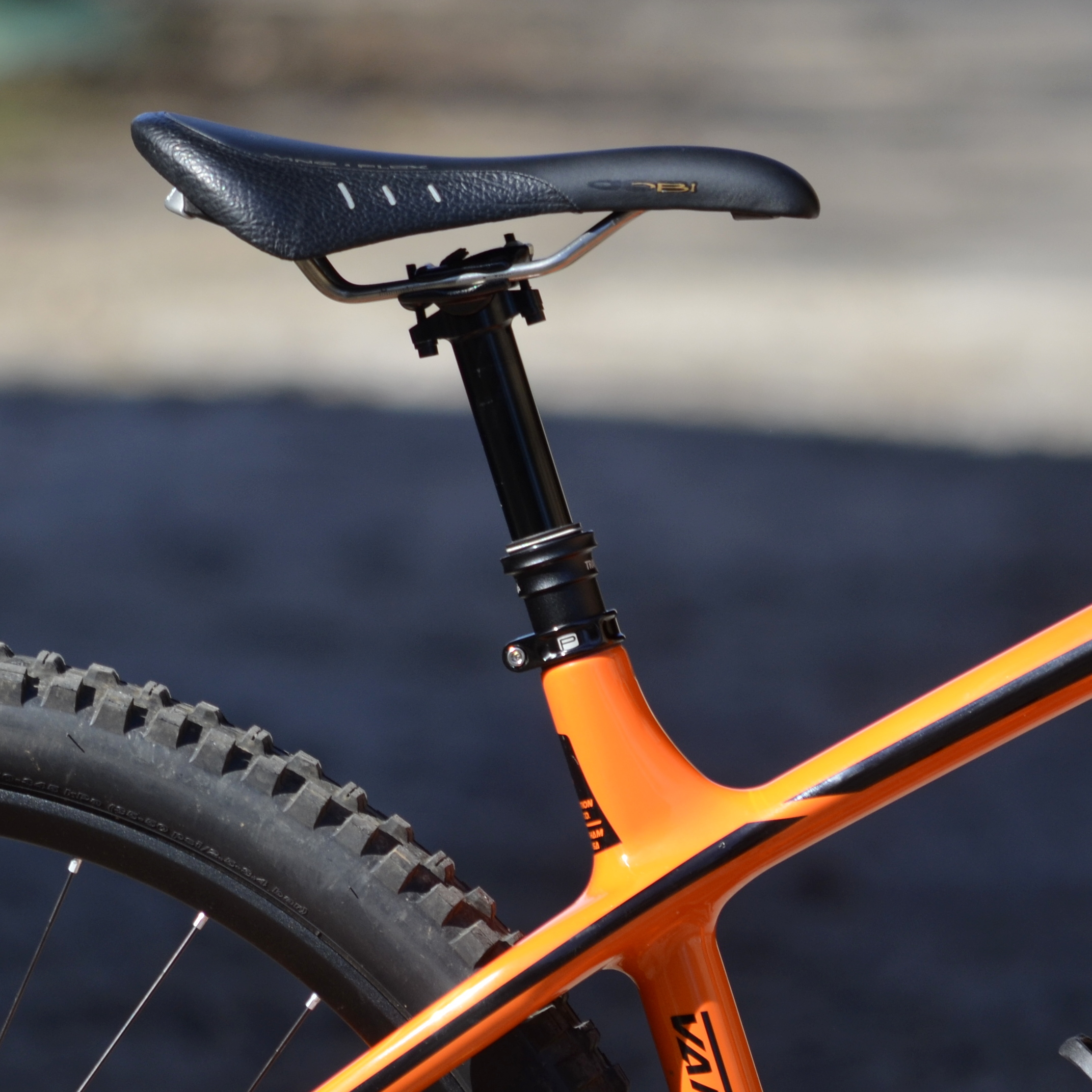
Lowered dropper post.

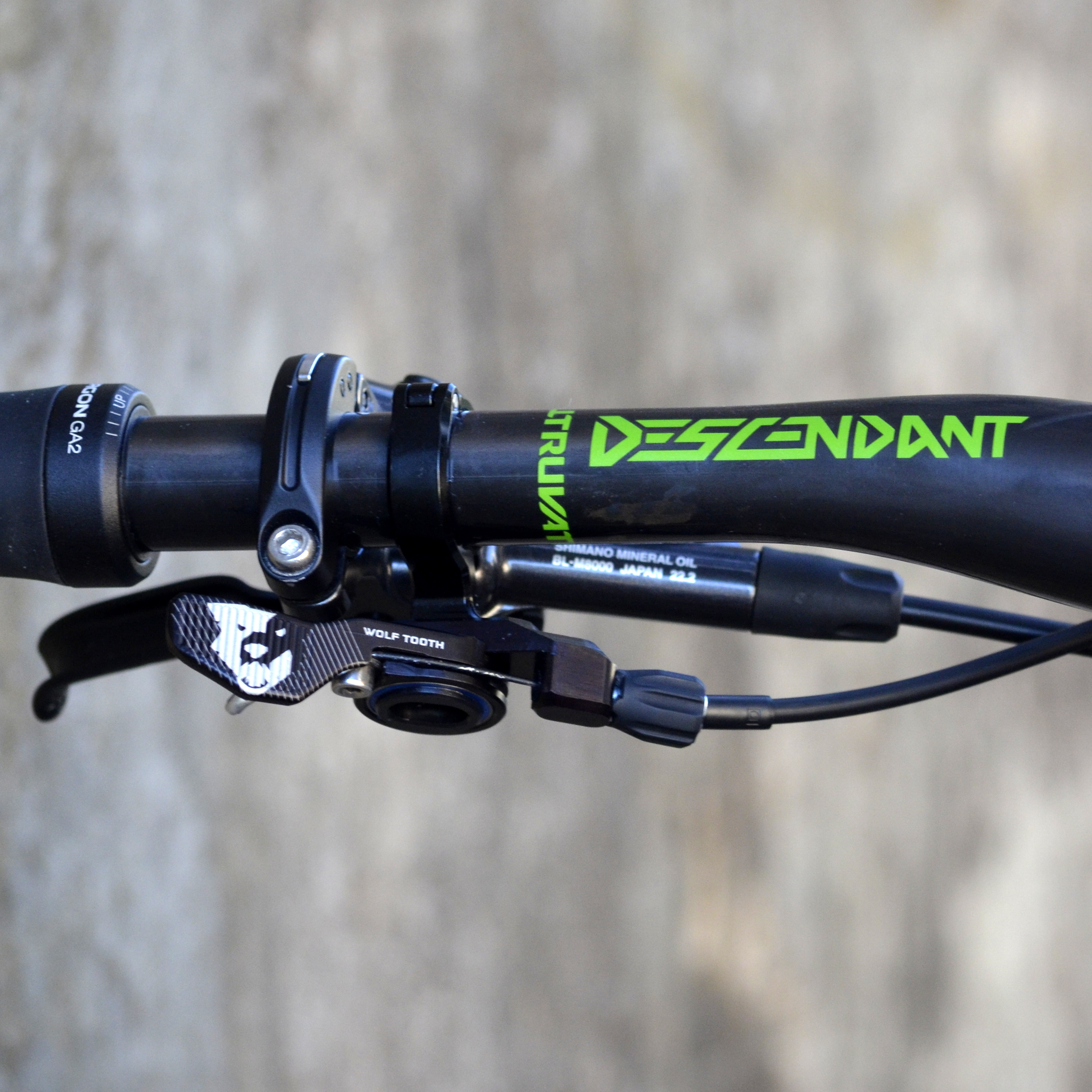
Control lever for a dropper post mounted on handlebars.

== Maintenance ==
Seatposts should be periodically removed from the frame, cleaned, greased and refitted to prevent the seatpost seizing in the frame. This is particularly important with bikes which do not have mudguards (fenders) that are regularly ridden in wet conditions. Care should be taken not to overtighten the bolt or quick-release lever which clamps the post in the frame, especially where this acts on two brazed lugs rather than a separate clamp-on collar. Overtightening can bend or break the frame lugs or strip the threads in a separate collar. Metal seatposts should be very well greased, with the slot in the bicycle's seat tube also filled with a smear of grease. This helps to prevent water from running down the seat tube.

There is some controversy about whether to grease carbon seatposts or not. There does not yet appear to be a consensus. There are now specialty products, referred to as "carbon prep" or "carbon paste", specifically for the interface between carbon and most other materials.
