= Bicycle seat =

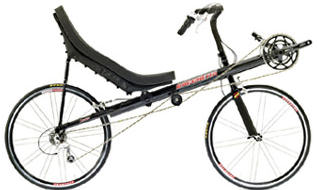
A Corsa bacchetta bicycle with a curved seat.

A bicycle seat, unlike a bicycle saddle, is designed to support the rider's buttocks and back, usually in a semi-reclined position. Arthur Garford is credited with inventing the padded bicycle seat in 1892, and they are now usually found on recumbent bicycles.

Bicycle seats come in three main styles: mesh, hardshell and combination.

== Seat types ==
=== Mesh ===
A typical mesh seat consists of a metal frame with mesh stretched over it and secured with adjustable straps, zip ties, string or shock cord.

=== Hardshell ===
Hardshell seats are normally made of a composite material such as GRP or carbon fibre although metal and wood versions do exist. A hardshell seat is normally covered with some-form of padding, this is usually closed or open cell foam although some extreme racing machines do not have any padding on the seat to reduce weight and increase efficiency. Hardshell seats are generally used at more reclined angles than mesh seats.

Some riders complain of excessive road noise vibrating through the hardshell seat. Also, the hardshell seat is "closed", providing no ventilation, which may cause excessive sweat to build up on the cyclist's back on hot days.

=== Combination ===
A combination seat has a padded hard seat base with a mesh back.

== Children's bicycle seat ==
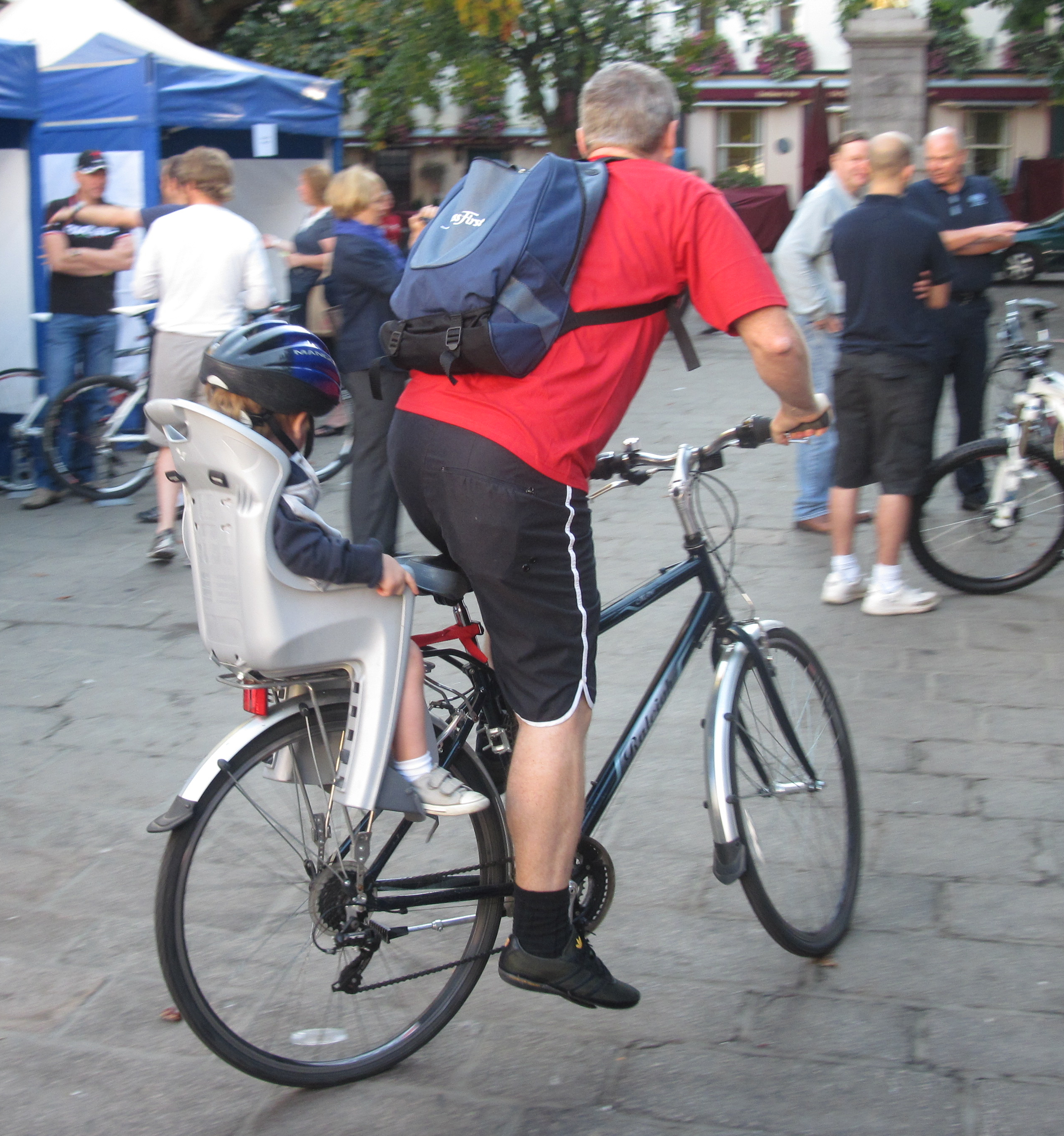
Children's bicycle seat

Some bicycle seats are designed for transporting children. They can be used to bring small children along during commutes and errands, or for recreational purposes.

The American Academy of Pediatricians recommends only children at least 12 months old be placed in children's bike seats to allow sufficient head and neck control, and the use of a helmet. However, some companies describe their seats as being designed for children 9 months or older.

Children's bicycle seats can be attached on the front or back of the bike. Rear-mounted seats can be mounted on the rear rack, onto the frame of the bike itself. Front-mounted seats are usually attached to the handlebar stem and are recommended only for babies and small toddlers, since they can usually only carry around 40 pounds. Some are designed for kids as young as 9 months old. Rear-mounted seats, in contrast, can hold more weight and older children: sometimes reaching 50-pound loads, they are usually best for 4 to 5-year-old children.

Some bicycle seats for children are built to carry older children, and are mounted onto the frame tube (the top tube or down tube) of a bicycle ahead of the rider’s saddle or, alternatively, on a sturdier version of the rear rack. These seats are generally intended for older children who can sit upright independently and often include integrated footrests; they are typically suitable for children from around three years of age up to a maximum stated weight, often around 35–40 kg, depending on the model and frame dimensions. Since they don't incorporate dedicated harnesses or meet the same safety standards as purpose-built child bicycle seats, they are only recommended for children who can maintain balance and grip of their own.

Alternatives include trailers and cargo carriers.

== See also ==
- Bicycle saddle
- Saddlebag
