= Bicycle saddle =

One of 5 contact points on an upright bicycle

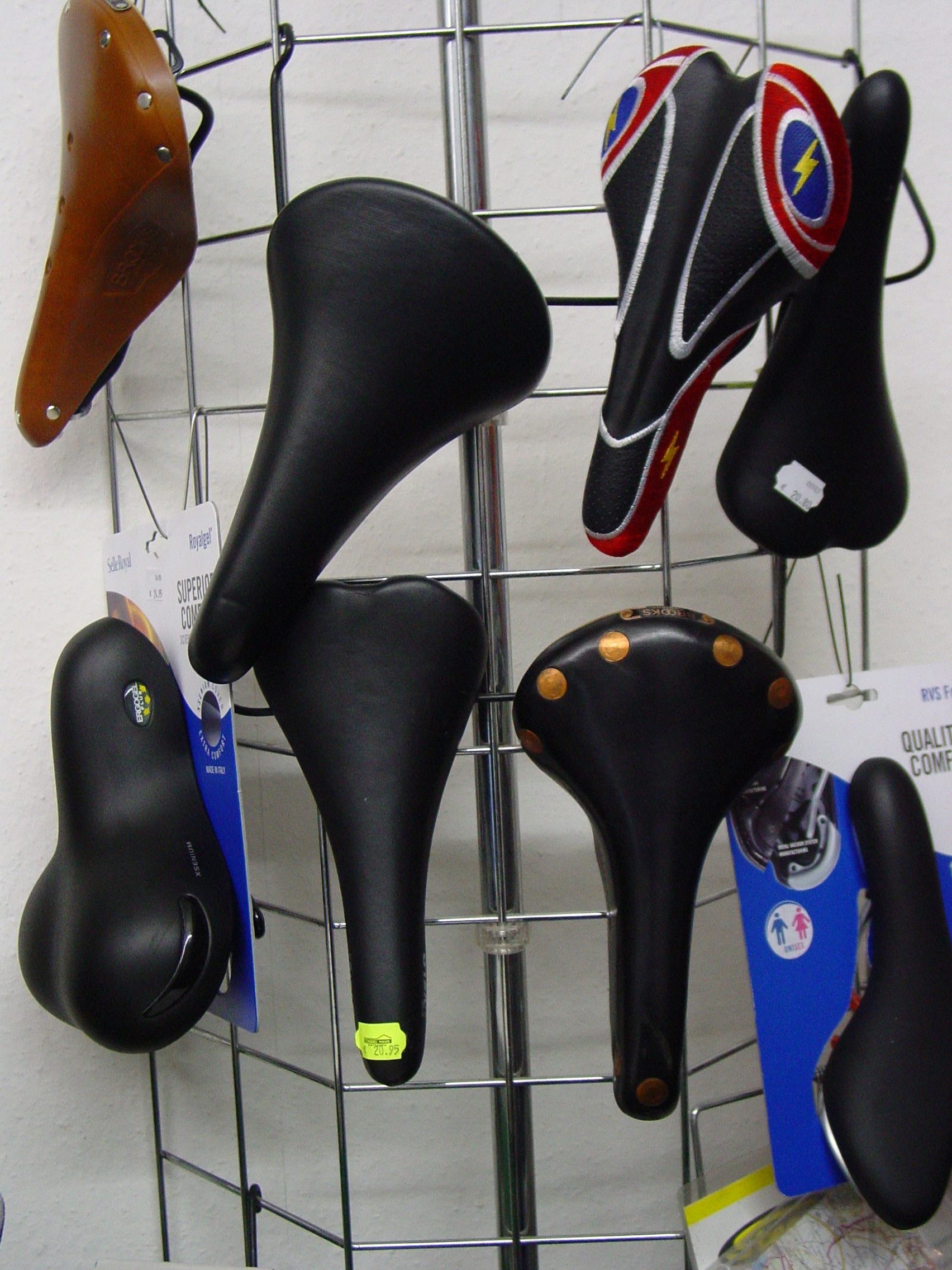
Various types of bicycle saddles

A bicycle saddle, sometimes called a bicycle seat, is one of five contact points on an upright bicycle, the others being the two pedals and the two handles on the handlebars. (A bicycle seat in the specific sense also supports the back.) The bicycle saddle has been known as such since the bicycle evolved from the draisine, a forerunner of the bicycle. It performs a similar role as a horse's saddle, not bearing all the weight of the rider as the other contact points also take some of the load.

A bicycle saddle is commonly attached to the seatpost and the height of the saddle can usually be adjusted by the seatpost telescoping in and out of the seat tube.

== Components ==
Typical saddles are composed of a few identifiable components.

=== Shell ===
The shell creates the shape of the saddle. The nose of the saddle is the foremost part. It is usually rounded. The shell can be made from several materials.

Most modern saddles have a hard shell made from a moulded piece of plastic, such as nylon. Carbon fiber may also be used.

Leather saddles do not have a hard shell. Instead a moulded piece of thick leather is stretched, like a taut hammock, between the front and rear ends of the rails. Traditional leather saddles such as those made by Brooks have been used for many years. Such a saddle is generally more comfortable after a break-in period during which it conforms to the shape of the rider, so long as the basic shape is right to start with.

=== Cover ===
Most saddles use some form of padding on top of the hard shell (often closed cell foam, gel, or gel-foam) followed by an outer cover consisting of spandex, vinyl, artificial leather, or leather.

Saddles designed for hard use e.g. mountain bike or BMX style riding, may have additional cover reinforcements such as Kevlar sewn to the cover to withstand abrasion on those areas most prone to abrasion.

=== Rails ===
The rails of a saddle are the connection point to the rest of the bike. They run along the underside of the saddle from the nose to the rear. Most saddles have two parallel rails that the seatpost clamps to, but designs vary from one to four rails. Rails provide fore and aft adjustment of the saddle, usually about 2-3 cm (an inch) or so. They can be made of solid or hollow steel, titanium, aluminum, manganese, or carbon fiber, typically trading off cost, weight, strength, and flexibility. A recent innovation, used with carbon shells and rails, is for the rails to be integrated into the shell for their entire length.

Rail configurations include:

- 2-rail "standard" round 7 mm diameter
- 2-rail oversize (typically for mountain bikes and BMX)
  - Round 8 mm diameter
  - Round 9 mm diameter (common)
- 2-rail carbon fiber (newer)
  - 7 mm round
  - 7 mm × 9 mm oval
  - 7 mm × 10 mm oval
  - 8.5 mm round
  - 9.6 mm round
- Single-rail I-beam (newer)
- 4-rail (e.g. wider Brooks leather saddles)
- Proprietary systems

=== Saddle clamp ===
The part that connects the rails to the seatpost is known as the "saddle clamp". It may be built into the top of the seatpost, or the seatpost may be essentially a pipe that provides a cylinder at the top (often 7/8 in (22 mm)) for a separate clamp to attach. The upper attachment point must be compatible with the rail configuration (though the two-rail 7 mm round configuration is very common), and the lower attachment point must match the diameter of the seatpost if not built in. The shape of some unusual saddles also makes them physically incompatible with certain seatpost, clamps, or frames, due to bumping into other parts or blocking adjustment or attachment bolts.

The most common type of sold-separate clamp has a single horizontal bolt-with-nut which goes behind the top of the seatpost. Tightening this bolt brings together four pieces of metal (two on each side) which have round slots to grab and hold standard-size rails. The inner rail grabbing pieces have interlocking grooves on the other side that interface into disc shapes on the outer sides of the central post-grabbing piece. Continued tightening of the bolt causes the central piece to close very slightly around the top of the post. To adjust the saddle's position, loosening the bolt allows the rails to slide forward and backward and to tilt up and down around the axis of the bolt.

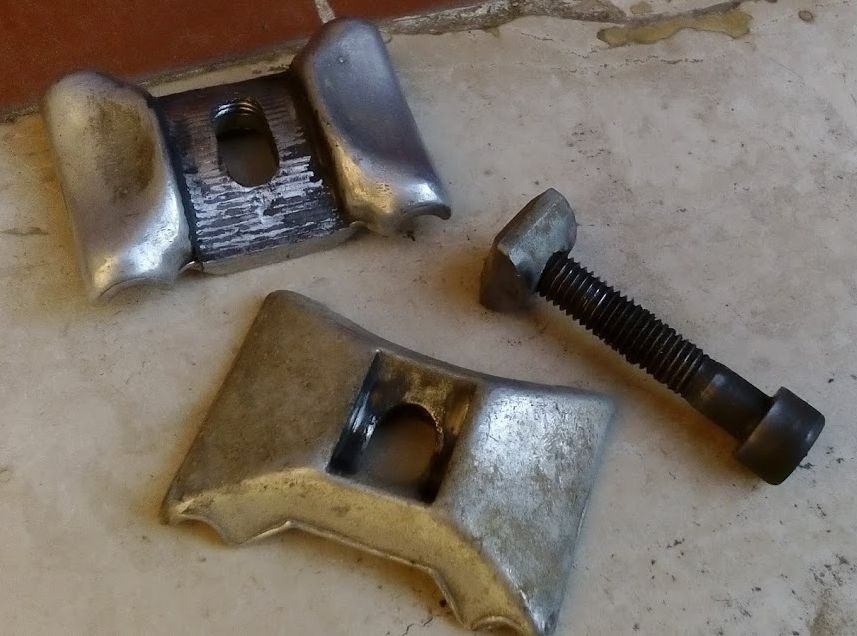
Parts of a single bolt saddle clamp. The ridges on the bottom section are worn. This clamp will not hold the seat in place.

There are two common types of built-in saddle clamps for standard rails, both associated with genericized trademarks:

- "Campagnolo" seatposts (older) use two vertical bolts to hold the two rail-grabbing pieces together. Loosening one bolt allows forward-and-back adjustment of the saddle; loosening one and tightening the other adjusts up/down tilt. In some cases, there is a separate bolt that controls tilt around a dedicated pivot. Because these systems do not rely on grooves, the tilt adjustment is continuous rather than stepped, and these are known as microadjust seatposts.
- "Laprade" seatposts (newer) use a single vertical bolt (typically an Allen bolt) which when tightened pushes two rail-grabbing pieces together. The lower surface of the lower rail-grabbing piece is convex and grooved, matching a concave groove on the top of the seatpost. The curve allows the up/down angle of the saddle to be adjusted when the bolt is loosened, and loosening also allows the rails to slide forward and back. Depending on the saddle angle, the vertical bolt is not perpendicular to the angle of the rails, but the grooves prevent the interface from slipping and adopting a completely horizontal angle. This angular adjustment mechanism is known as pivotal and is common on BMX bikes. Because the grooves are finer than the grooved discs in the sold-separately saddle clamp, sometimes Laprade-style posts are also marketed as "microadjustable" even though the adjustment is not continuous as with the Campagnolo style.

I-beam rails are long and allow a wide fore-aft adjustment range. I-beam saddle clamps use two clamping bolts for grab pieces holding the single rail. Other historical saddle clamp variations included the Ideale saddle/Zeus post combination, which used a special seatpost designed to forgo the need for a clamp in order maximize weight savings.

=== Suspension ===
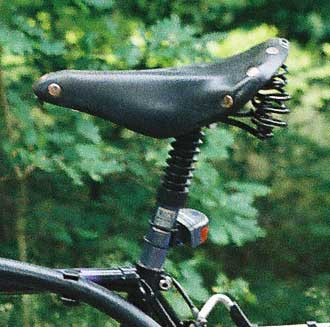
A Brooks leather suspension saddle mounted on a suspension seatpost.

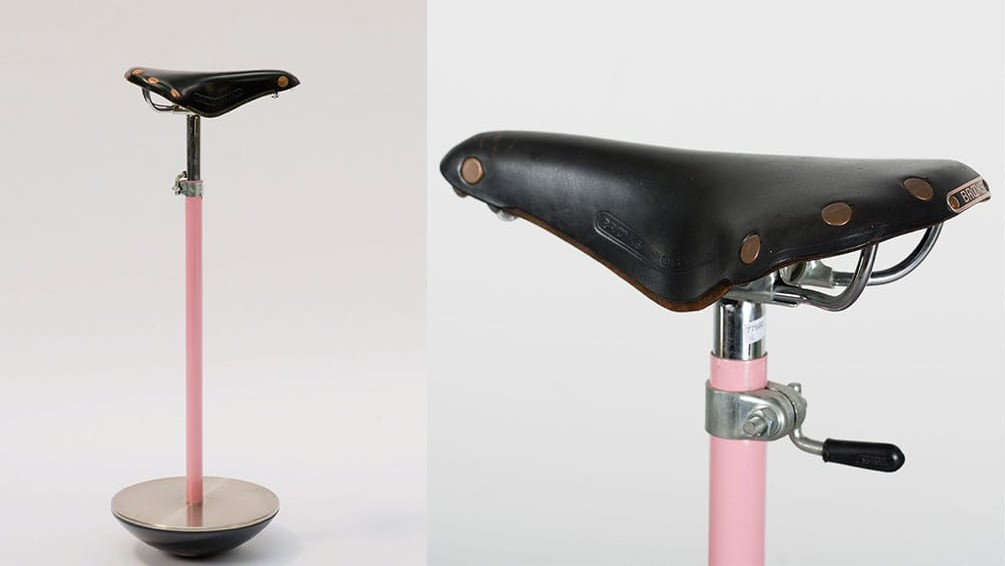
Sella stool designed by Achille and Pier Giacomo Castiglioni for Zanotta (1957)

A saddle may contain one or more suspension components to improve rider comfort by absorbing or deadening vibration and shock transmitted by the frame and seatpost.

Saddles may incorporate gel, gel-foam, and/or multiple-density foam padding or lining to cushion impacts from the roadway, while integrated saddle rails may be designed with added length in order to flex vertically, providing limited shock and bump absorption.

Another method encountered on recreational, comfort, or 'cruiser' saddles is to attach a pair of steel coil springs to the rear terminus of the saddle rails, affixed at their other end to the rear of the saddle. Some newer suspension designs replace the twin coil springs with four or more elastomer donut-type springs. By using interchangeable elastomers with variable densities the suspension saddle can be tuned to the rider's weight and riding style.

Yet another method of suspension utilizes a web-spring platform made of eight or more coil springs mounted horizontally beneath the saddle shell. These springs are connected to each other at the approximate center of the saddle, with the ends connected radially to the perimeter of the saddle frame, forming a spider's web. A shock transmitted to the seat is partially absorbed by this web-spring platform. In an effort to cut cost and weight, some suspension saddles utilize a skeletonized, flexible nylon frame in lieu of the steel web-spring.

Saddles may incorporate two or more of these suspension designs in an effort to provide additional comfort and shock absorption, as they have since cycling first became popular in the 1880s.

== Adjustment ==
The position of the saddle should be adjusted relative to the bottom bracket, not to the ground or handlebars. For example, if the reach to the handlebars is too far, it is better to get a shorter stem than to move the saddle forward of its ideal location. More accurately, saddle height should be adjusted relative to the position of the pedals as fitting different pedals or different length cranks would also mean the saddle needs to be re-adjusted. In practice, the distance from the top of the saddle to the center of the bottom bracket is used as the saddle height, e.g., setting up a new bicycle using measurements from another, as this is easier to measure. Other methods and calculations are used for determining seat height, such as LeMond's formula. Some saddles now provide an even greater level of adjustment by making the front and rear width adjustable to properly fit a cyclist's anatomy.

=== Height ===
The saddle height should be set so that when pedaling, the legs have a slight bend even when the pedals are at their furthest distance. This means that if the saddle height is properly adjusted, on bikes with traditional geometry, the rider cannot place both feet flat on the ground when seated on the saddle. If they can, their saddle is too low, unless the bike is a recumbent bicycle, crank-forward, BMX or other form of special bicycle.

=== Tilt ===
The saddle should be nearly level, although the height of the handlebars and style of cycling will cause this to vary. In professional bicycle racing, UCI rules require that the saddle be within 3° of level.

=== Fore and aft ===
Conventional wisdom dictates that the saddle should be positioned so that when the crankarms are horizontal and the feet are on the pedals the head of fibula of the forward leg is approximately above the pedal spindle in a vertical line. However, several authors argue that there is no anatomical basis for this. Furthermore, the relative position of saddle and bottom bracket varies between road racing, track and triathlon bicycles.

The range of adjustment differs for each saddle, and the comparison of saddles for increased ranges of adjustment can be confusing owing to their different shapes. In comparing them, it is the range of adjustment of their comfort points that need considered, and because the matter is largely subjective, giving it proper attention is difficult to do. The range of fore-aft adjustment for double-rail saddles rarely exceeds 2-3 cm (an inch) or so, but advertisers claim that I-beam saddle designs can give up to 200% more adjustment range than some of these.

When the fore-aft adjustment range of the saddle needs further extension than the clamp affords, it may be possible to add a saddle adjuster. One such adjuster mounts on the existing saddle clamp and allows up to 40 mm of increase or decrease in the fore-aft position of the saddle. Another method for increasing the fore-aft adjustment is the swept-back seatpost, where the seatpost has a curve in it over the 150 mm (6 in) or so before the saddle. Because of the gentle sweep of the tube, the top part of the seatpost cannot fit within the seat tube, so this solution is useful only for high seat positions.

== Sizes ==
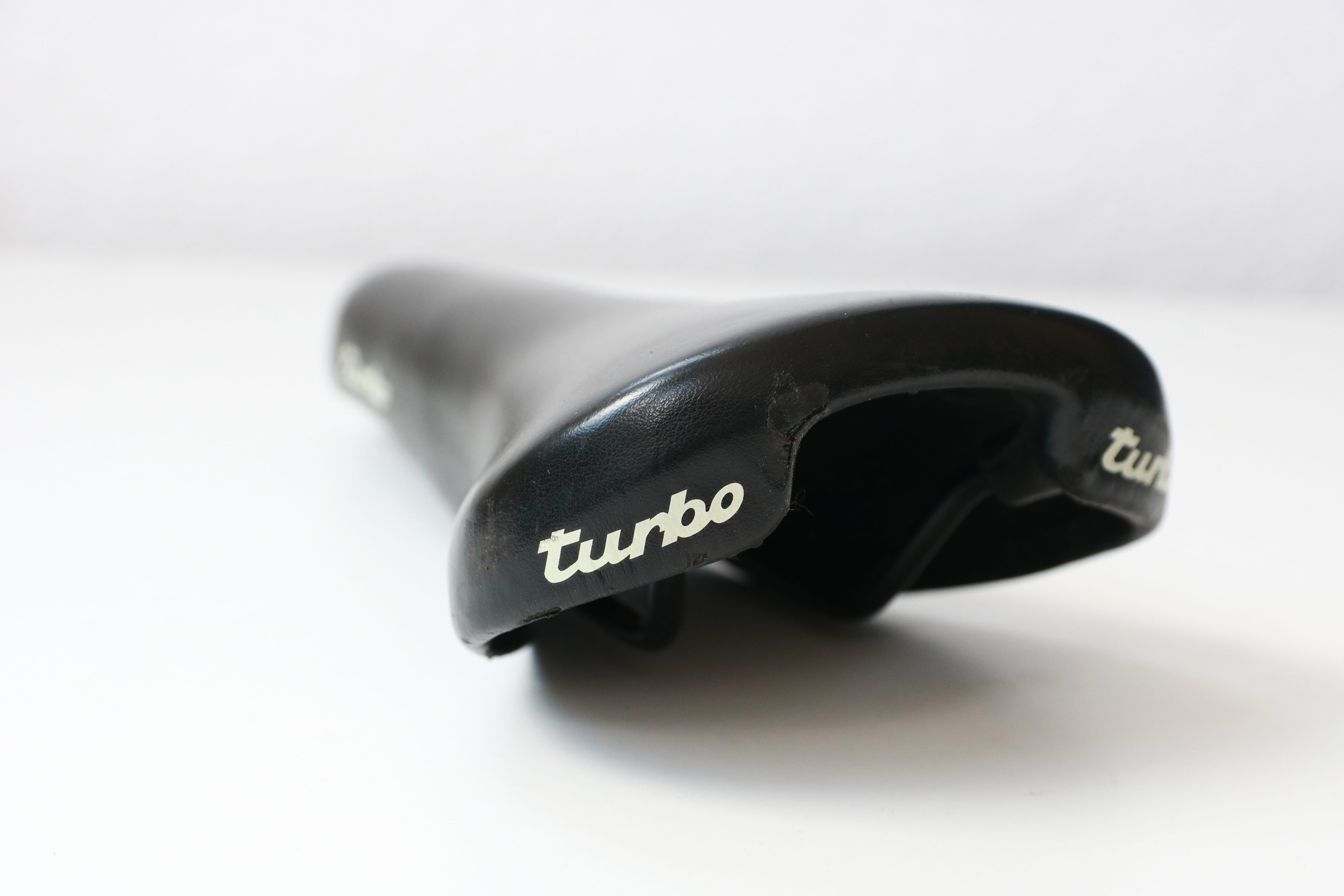
Selle Italia Turbo classic road saddle

While small saddles are available for children's bikes, the primary size parameter for adult saddles is width. Performance saddles, such as for racing, tend to be narrow. Comfort saddles, often found on hybrid bicycles, tend to be wide.

== Variations ==
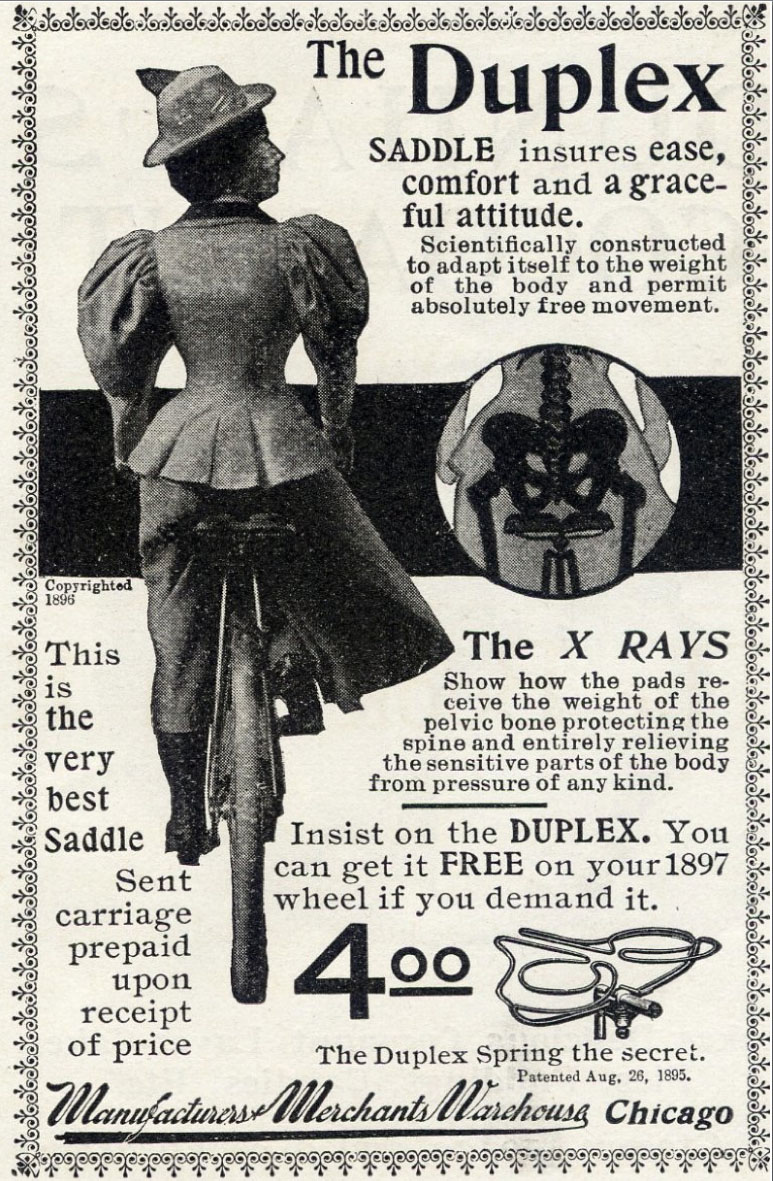
An 1890s ad for a saddle that supports the sitz bones, with a central hollow. "Anatomical saddles" were popular at the time

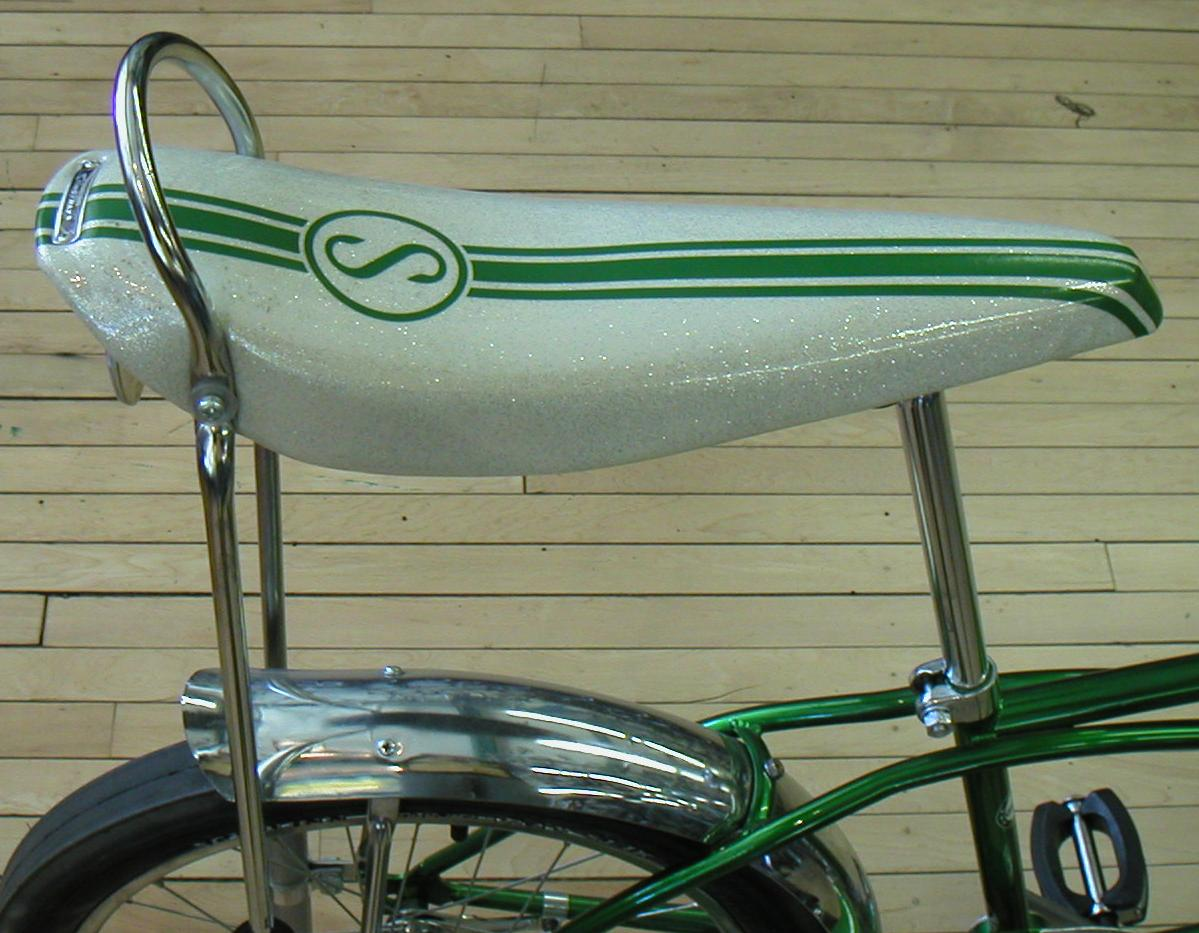
A "banana seat".

Several variations have been developed, either for aesthetic reasons, or to address issues mentioned in the next section.

Cutaway saddles have a hollow on the midline.

No-nose or noseless saddles do not have the front nose (also called horn) part of the seat. This is to eliminate the crushing injuries experienced by riders. In standard seats the weight of the rider is often supported at the contact point between the pelvic bone and nose of the seat. The high pressure caused by the small contact area causes crushing injuries in the perineum over the center of the nose, and the muscles and tendons connecting to the interior side of the "sit bones" (ischial tuberosities) at the back of the inner thighs over the sides of the "nose". The "no-nose" seats eliminate the nose, and support the body at the bottom of the "sit bones", spreading the body's weight over a larger contact area causing lower peak pressure areas to avoid the crushing injuries caused by standard seats. No-nose seats require different bracing forces to keep the rider from slipping down. This is often done by keeping the legs or arms under moderate constant tension which can cause additional effort on the part of the rider. While not adopted by competitive cyclists, no-nose saddles have been shown to improve erectile function among cyclists suffering from ED. A 2008 study measured ED and genital numbness among bicycling police officers who used traditional saddles versus the same officers after using no-nose saddles for six months. The number of officers experiencing genital numbness fell from 73% to 12%. Cases of erectile dysfunction also fell significantly. This research won the Bullard Sherwood Award of the National Institute for Occupational Safety and Health, for intervention research.

Women-specific saddles were introduced and widely marketed in the early days of cycling. For instance, the 1898 "Christy Anatomical saddle", developed by Spalding, was designed with a hollow seat for avoiding any friction on the genitalia. Side-saddles like "The Lady Ariel Side-Saddle Ordinary" were also made.

One type was designed and marketed in 1992 by women's-equipment designer Georgena Terry. Others are produced by several manufacturers. Differences may include a wider seat area, shorter nose, and center relief.

A banana seat is a long saddle, usually supported at both ends, popular on wheelie bikes. The rider can choose where they sit on it. It is sometimes used to carry a passenger.

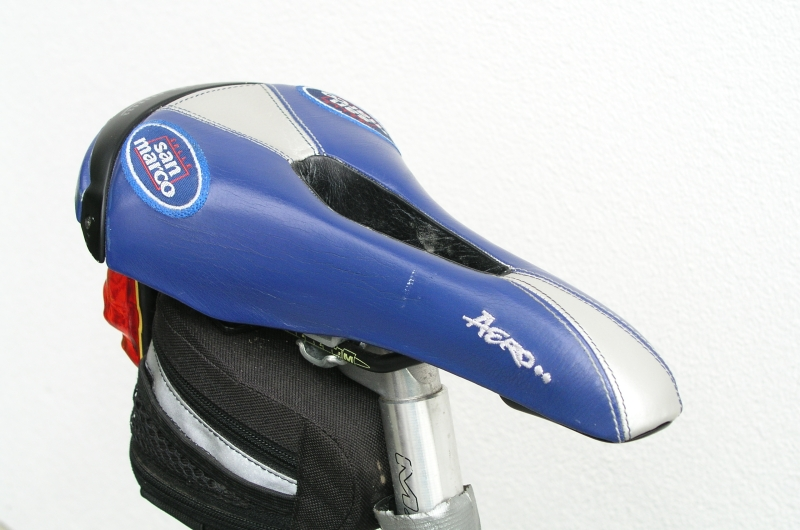
A Selle San Marco saddle for women (cutaway)

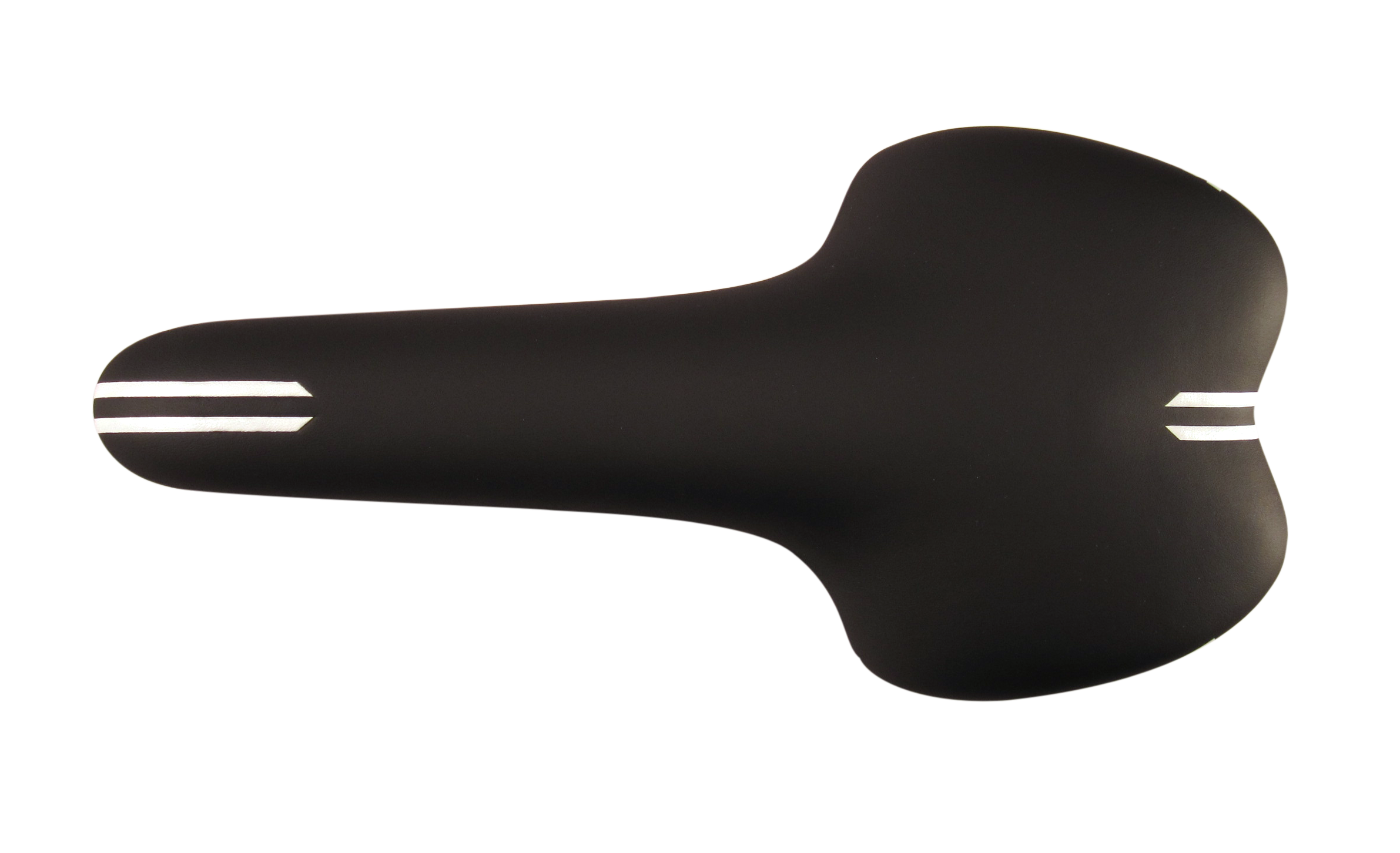
Anatomical racing bicycle seat

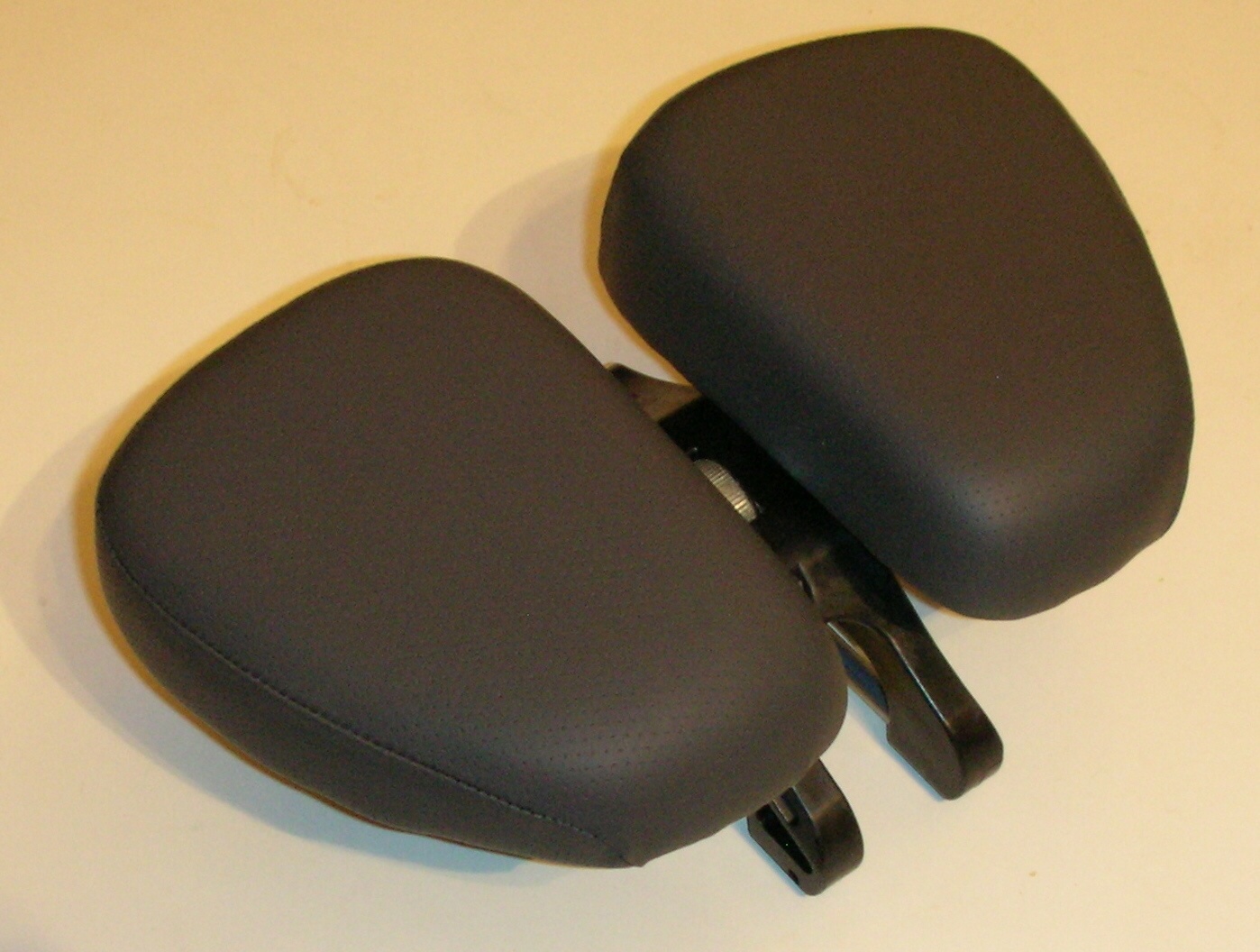
Ergonomical saddle EasySeat II (Hobson)

A video on the health benefits of no-nose saddles

== Issues ==
Several issues associated with sitting on traditional bicycle saddles have been identified. These are prevalent in occupations with heavy bicycle use, including police. The pressure of the saddle on the perineal area after prolonged bicycling has been found to cause perineal folliculitis, furuncles, lymphedema, and chafing. Some women have had difficulties urinating or sustaining sexual intercourse after prolonged periods on their bike saddle.

=== Crotch pressure ===
Though riding an upright bicycle improves the cardiovascular system and can therefore actually improve the erectile function among men, riding a bicycle for prolonged periods of time with an unhealthy cycling technique can still cause problems for both men and women due to a reduced blood flow in the crotch area. Some male riders—survey data published in 2005 indicated around 5%—may ultimately get erectile dysfunction problems if a poor cycling technique is used with prolonged pressure on the perineum. Both men and women may also get reduced sensitivity in the crotch. A sign of these problems can sometimes be a tingling sensation in the area when stepping off the bicycle after a ride, as blood flow surges back into the area again. This issue is more related to the cycling technique than the saddle type, although there are special, more anatomically correct, designs to relieve crotch pressure as well. Examples of such designs include the cutaway saddles and noseless saddles. Cutaway saddles resemble regular saddles in their design, but with the middle part cut out to reduce pressure on the perineum among men. Noseless saddles are basically two separate saddles next to each other, with one smaller "saddle" per buttock. Such saddles achieve a similar relief of pressure by using a different design.

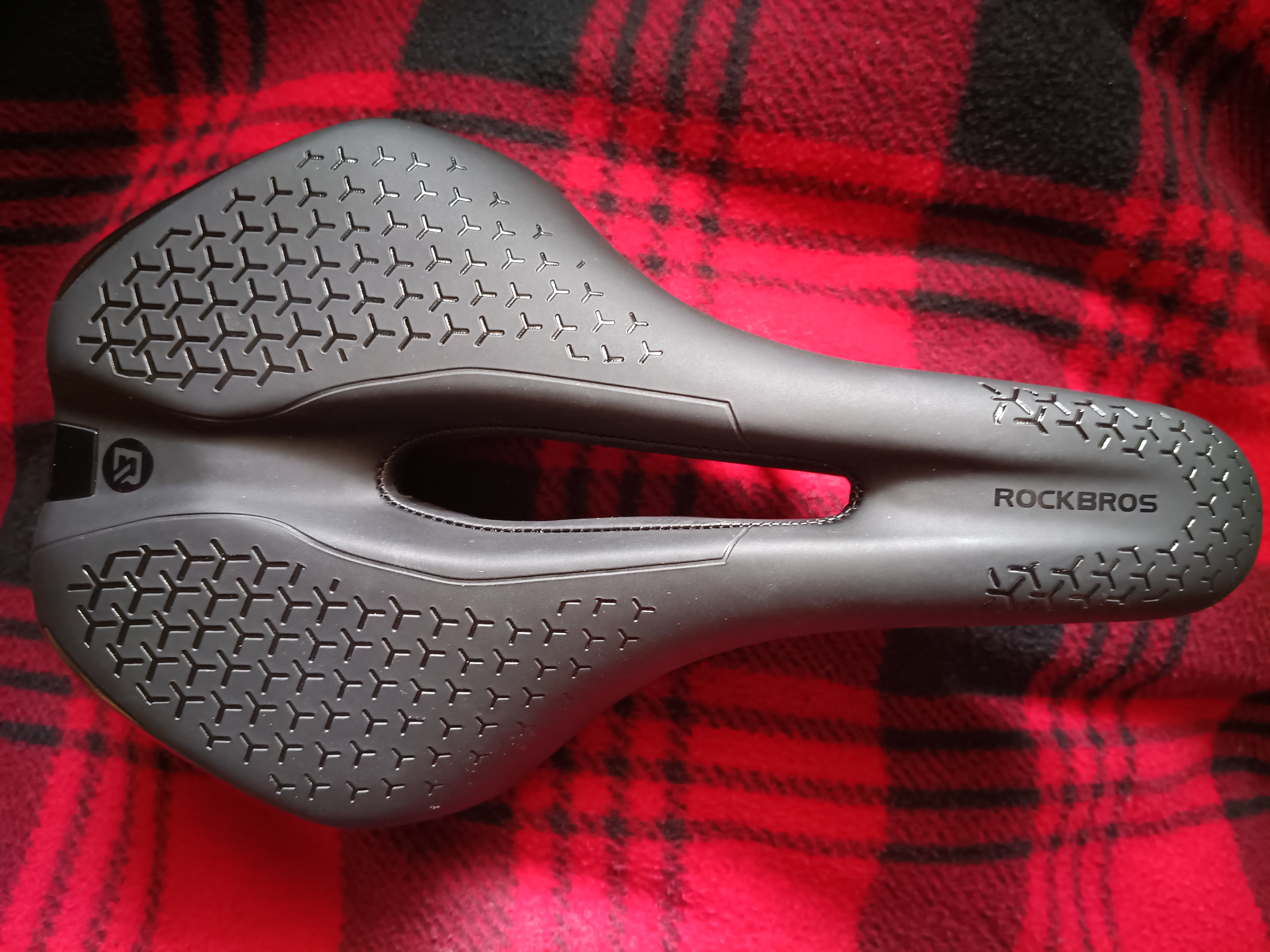
Sport bicycle saddle with a central relief channel (cut-out) designed to reduce pressure on the perineum

Some useful techniques to reduce crotch pressure while cycling include:

- Ensuring the saddle is roughly horizontally aligned, or only slightly nose up. Having overly upwards nose alignment will directly increase the perineum pressure, while a downwards alignment will reduce the sit bone support of the pelvis, again resulting in an increased perineum pressure.
- Standing up occasionally, such as on hills and when accelerating.
- Adjusting seating position from time to time. For example, sitting closer to the rear when cycling on hills and only sitting on the nose for brief periods.
- Sitting up now and then without leaning forward as much.

=== Detumescence and genital numbness ===
In 2014, the largest ever study of cyclists found no correlation between cycling and either erectile dysfunction or infertility. In previous studies, bicycle riding had been correlated with genital numbness, erectile dysfunction (ED) and perianal hematoma, and several studies had shown that long-distance cyclists have an increased incidence of ED as compared to the general population. ED and genital numbness were thought to result from compression of the cyclists' perineal region while sitting on their saddles. 50–91% of cyclists experience genital numbness. To alleviate the problem, manufacturers have designed a number of bicycle saddles that purport to allow greater blood flow through the pudendal artery. These saddles vary in shape, width, and padding and have been studied to determine any actual effects on cyclists' health. (However, most current research excludes discussion of female sexual dysfunction and genital numbness.)

The studies have shown that wider saddles tend to increase penile blood flow while cycling, though wider seats also induce chafing and impede a cyclist's full range of leg motion. A downward-tilted saddle relieves pressure on the perineum and the "sit bones" (ischial tuberosities), thus improving a cyclist's perineal blood flow. Most saddles include padding, generally foam or gel. Gel padding tends to distribute pressure in the perineum and provide higher levels of penile oxygenation than does foam padding. However, width and design have proved to be more important than the amount of saddle padding in determining the intensity of perineal distress the cyclist suffers. In fact, some researchers have postulated that extra padding, foam or gel, can result in an increased prevalence of pain in the sit bones.

== See also ==
- Bicycle seat
- Outline of cycling
