= Feel Desain =

Italian blog

Feel Desain is a blog aimed at the creative industries. It features general articles, inspiration, and visual communications related to categories including Adv, Architecture, Art, Design, Digital, Photography, Events, Fashion & Graphic Design, and also runs giveaways of selected products for readers.

Based in Turin, the online magazine has a particular focus on Italian products, designers and artists, but also regularly publishes articles about other projects from around the world. The articles are written in English.

Feel Desain also has a section called 8 Questions With..., featuring interviews with influential people in the world of creativity and design, such as founder of Red Dot, Peter Zec, architect Carlo Ratti, and illustrators such Elisa Talentino and Fernando Cobelo.

In 2014 Feel Desain released its first paper magazine called Feel, while in May 2018 the second issue was launched during Forward Festivals in Munich, Germany, with 2,000 visitors and more than 40 speakers.

== History ==
Feel Desain was launched on 10 September 2010 by creatives Luciano Aiello and Marco Gallo, who aimed to make a creative community, and inspire others to make their way in the world of creativity.

On 4 December 2011, Feel Desain became a contributor to the blog section of La Stampa online, where Luciano Aiello, Marco Gallo and Rossella Quaranta are responsible for maintaining a section named Istantanee.

In 2012, Feel Desain's founders started Curve Creative Studio, a communication agency based in Turin, and Feel Desain became the agency's sister company.

Feel Desain has been an official media partner of a number of international design festivals, such as Design Days Dubai, Designmonat Graz, Forward Festivals, Saudi Design Week, Torino Graphic Days, NYCxDesign and Design Miami Basel, as well as international graphic design contest Posterheroes and collaborative project Ladies, Wine & Design Turin by Jessica Walsh. Moreover, Feel Desain is part of VICE Digital Network.
