= Georgena Terry =

American bicycle designer

Georgena Terry is an American bicycle designer and businesswoman who began the first women-specific bicycle company, Terry Precision Cycling, in 1985.

== Biography ==
Raised in Alabama in the United States, she gained a degree in mechanical engineering from Carnegie-Mellon University and worked at Westinghouse Electric’s nuclear services division during summer breaks. While working at Xerox Corp in Rochester she began making bicycle frames for friends. The bicycles were hand-built with frame geometries and wheel sizes designed to better fit women, and her business grew rapidly from 20 bicycles in 1985 to 5,000 in 1987.

She developed and patented a design of bike saddle specifically for women in 1991 and handlebars with reduced diameter to suit people with smaller hands in 1994. The saddles featured the now-common cut-away centres and Terry now produces ergonomic saddles for both men and women.
