= Pedal-powered vehicle =

Pedal-powered vehicle may refer to:

== Air ==
- Human-powered aircraft
- Human-powered airship
- Human-powered helicopter

== Amphibious ==
- Amphibious cycle

== Land ==
- Bicycle
- Bicycle trailer
- BMX bike
- Boneshaker (bicycle)
- Cargo bike
- City bicycle
- Cruiser bicycle
- Cycle rickshaw
- Cyclo-cross bicycle
- Fatbike
- Flat bar road bike
- Folding bicycle
- Go kart
- Hotchkiss Bicycle Railroad
- Hybrid bicycle
- Model car
- Mountain bike
- Party bike
- Pedelec
- Penny-farthing
- Porteur bicycle
- Prone bicycle
- Quadracycle
- Recumbent bicycle
- Road bicycle
- Roadster (bicycle)
- Safety bicycle
- Small wheel bicycle
- Tandem bicycle
- Touring bicycle
- Trailer bike
- Tricycle
- Unicycle
- Utility bicycle
- Velocar
- Velocipede
- Velomobile

== Water ==
- Hydrocycle
- Pedalo
