= Fitness bicycle =

Fitness bicycle may refer to:

- Stationary bicycle
- A type of hybrid bicycle which exhibits road bike speed and upright comfort join together for aggressive fitness rides or long commutes.
