= Soma Fabrications =

SOMA Fabrications
- Company type: Private
- Industry: Bicycles
- Founded: 2001; 25 years ago
- Headquarters: San Francisco Bay Area, U.S.
- Products: Bicycle frames and other parts
- Website: www.somafab.com

SOMA Fabrications is a designer and importer of bicycles, frames, parts and accessories based in the San Francisco Bay Area. It was established in 2001 and owned by bicycle parts wholesaler The Merry Sales Co.

The SOMA Fabrications brand came about when Bradley Woehl, owner of American Cyclery bicycle shop asked Jim Porter, President of The Merry Sales Co. if he could uses his sources in Taiwan to produce a line of chromoly steel bicycle frames. Woehl and Porter have collaborated on product ideas for the brand ever since.

SOMA sells frames for cyclo-cross, touring/cargo, mixte, mountain, road, and track bikes as well as tires.

SOMA was an early manufacturer of flared drop handlebars for use on dirt bicycles.
