= Uppadine Cycles =

British bicycle manufacturer (1940s-1970s)

Uppadine Cycles was a British manufacturer of bicycles from the 1940s until the early 1970s. They were located in Doncaster. Models included traditional road bicycles and a tandem.
