= John Richard Dedicoat =

John Richard Dedicoat (born 1840, Birmingham; died 1903) was the inventor of the pencil-sharpening machine, bicycle bell, and other bicycle related items. Apprenticed to James Watt, he went on to become a bicycle manufacturer and made and sold the "Pegasus" bicycle.

Dedicoat designed a spring step to assist in mounting bicycles with high seats. Some people found it quite an effort to hoist themselves into the saddle from the step. Dedicoat's invention was based on the action of a groom, who, when a lady puts her foot in his hand in mounting a horse, gives her a lift into the saddle; so with this step it was pushed down against a spring until a catch held it. The step rocked on a hinge which turned as the leg was straightened and released the spring, the rider then getting a lift of 5 or 6 inches just at the moment he was reaching for the saddle. It was very pretty but had one defect: if the spring was too strong for the weight of the rider, it did its work too well, and shot him not into the saddle, but over the handles.
