= Bicycle handlebar =

Steering control for bicycles

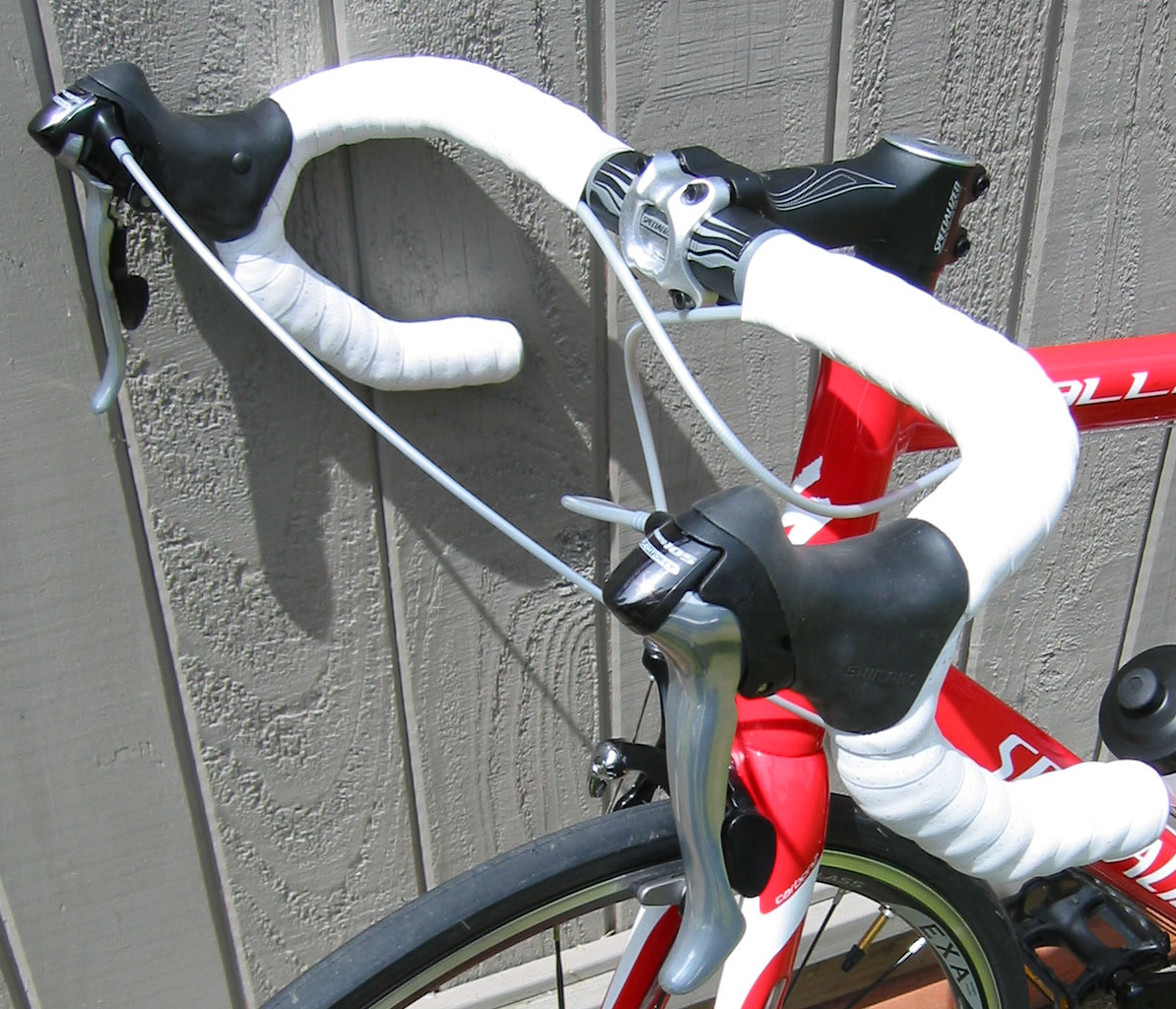
Drop handlebars (of the "ergo" or "anatomic" variety)

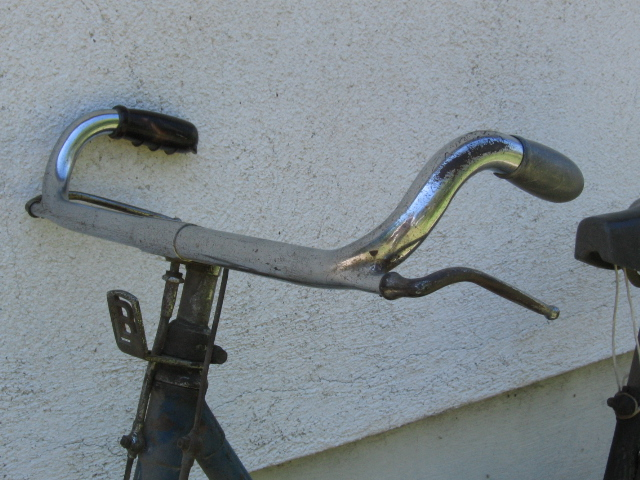
Porteur type bicycle handlebar, from an Italian Bianchi bicycle, circa 1940

A bicycle handlebar is the steering control for bicycles. It is the equivalent of a tiller for vehicles and vessels, as it is most often directly mechanically linked to a pivoting front wheel via a stem which in turn attaches it to the fork. Besides steering, handlebars also often support a portion of the rider's weight, depending on their riding position, and provide a convenient mounting place for brake levers, shift levers, cyclocomputers, bells, etc.

== History ==
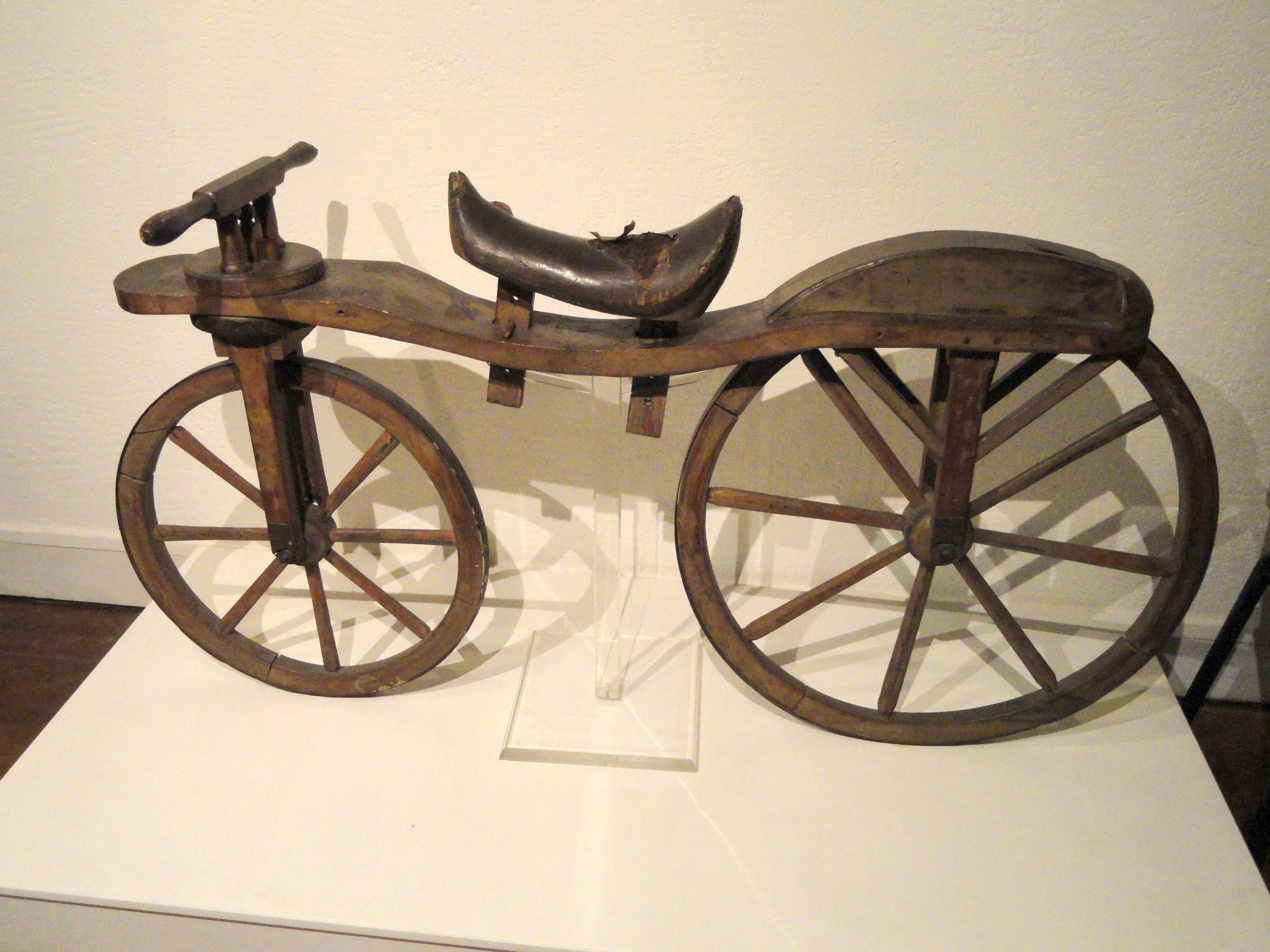
Handlebar on an 1818 draisienne by Niépce

The dandy horse, or draisienne, invented by Karl Drais and the first vehicle with two wheels arranged in tandem, was controlled by a bar connected to the front steering mechanism and held by the riders' two hands. The first handlebars were solid bars of steel or wood, depending on the manufacturer. Curved, moustache-shaped, drop handlebars became popular in the 1920s. Whatton bars were developed in attempt to improve the safety of penny-farthings. Handlebars made of wood, instead of steel, were used on safety bicycles to reduce weight in the 1890s. Although aluminum had been used to make bicycles as early as 1935, it was considered unsafe for handlebars until Cinelli produced them in 1963.

== Types of handlebar ==
Handlebars come in a variety of types designed for particular types of riding.

=== Drop ===
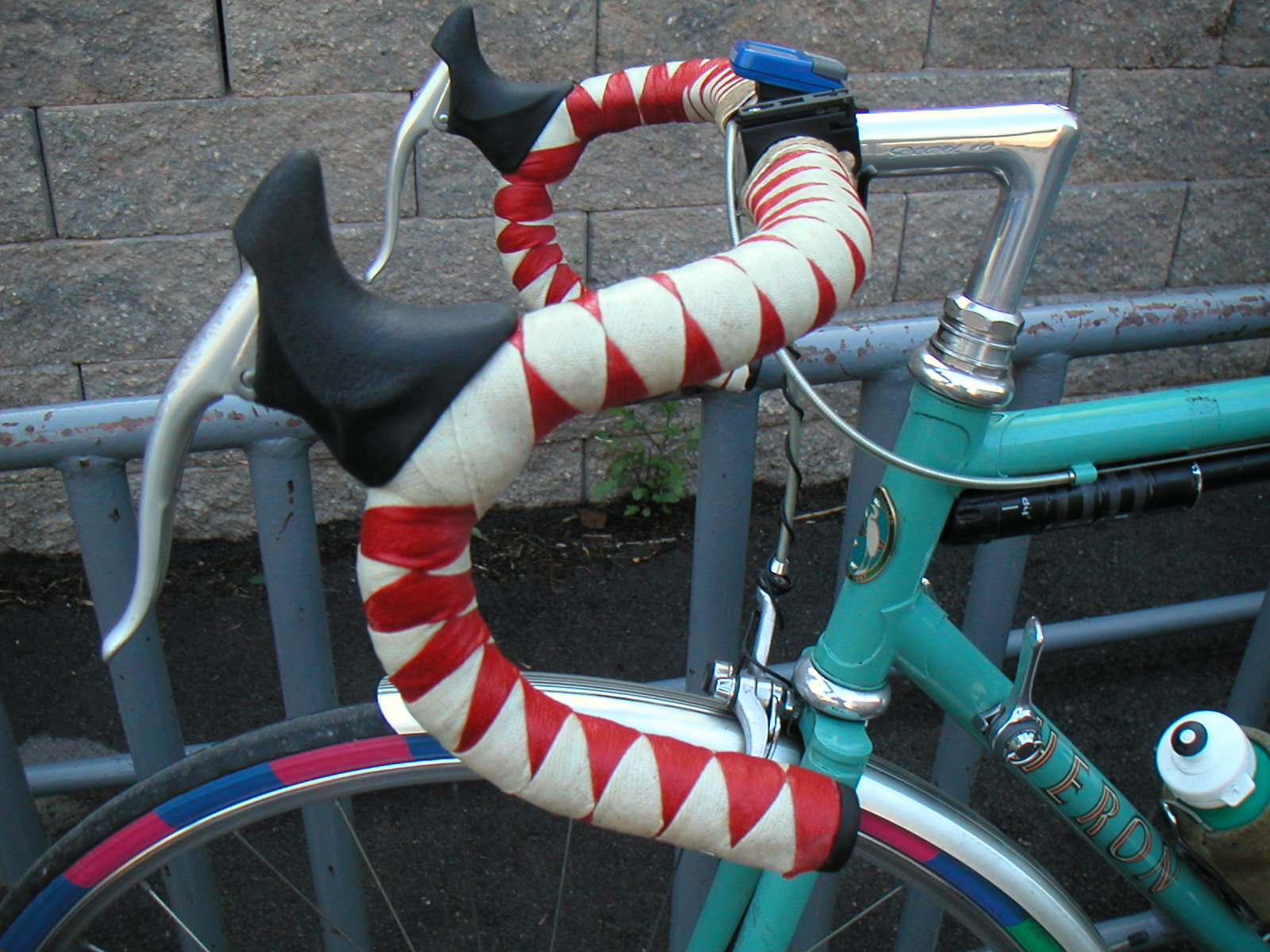
Conventional drop handlebars with harlequin cloth tape wrapping

Typical drop handlebars feature a straight central section attached to the stem, with each end curving first forwards and down, and then back towards the rider at a lower position. These are a very popular type of handlebar, and their exact shape and purpose leads them to be further categorised as follows.

Standard

These classic racing handlebars, as used on road or track bicycles. The bars are designed with three basic parameters; reach, drop and width. They can be further classified into three categories: classic, typically having a long reach and a deep drop, compact, featuring shorter reach and a shallow drop, and ergo or anatomic, described below. Drop bars may have one or two longitudinal indentations so that the brake and shift cables protrude less when they are wrapped under the bar tape. They may also have a flattened top section.

Track

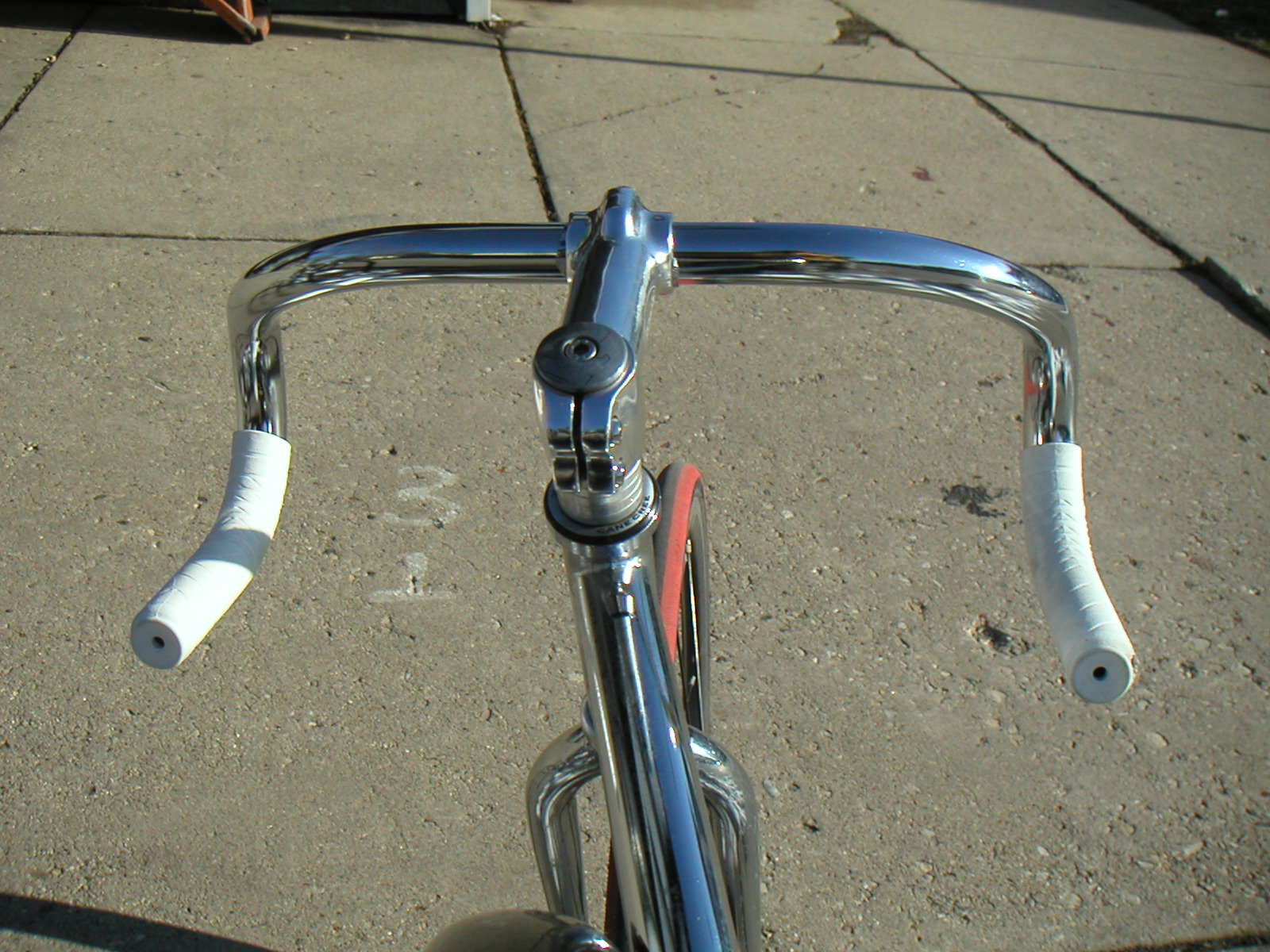
"Track" style bars with large-radius curve

Track drop bars are a variation of bars designed for the typical riding positions of track bicycle racers. Track drops are characterized by large, sweeping ramps, effectively precluding the top and brake hood hand positions, but promoting the rider's use of the ends, or "hooks". Track bars are designed for use without brake levers, but recently experienced a surge in popularity on use with fixed gear bikes, and as such have been adapted to fit levers and hand positions.

Ergo or anatomic

The shape of the drop may be a simple, traditional curve, or it can have a flat spot (straight section) which some riders find to be more comfortable for their hands. These bars may be described as ergo or anatomic.

Some manufacturers have relegated the term anatomic to this curvature shape, while adopting the term ergo to instead describe non-cylindrical tubing cross-sections on the upper flat portion of the bar, intended to be more comfortable when riding in the upright position.

Randonneur

Drop bars that rise slightly from the center in a shallow U, and the drop portion of the bars is set wider than the curve at the top. Designed to be slightly more comfortable than a straight drop bar for bicycles used in Audax riding. However the popularity of these bars has plummeted over the last 20 years as more and more cycle-tourists, brought up on mountainbikes, choose to use one of the 'flat' bar variations either using bar-ends or 'butterfly' bars for their holidays. However the popularity of 'gravel' bikes has seen them make a come-back.

Drop-in

At one time, manufacturers and racers experimented with drop-in bars that had an additional extension in toward the head tube at the rear end of the drops. This was intended to offer an even more aerodynamic position, due to low and narrow placement of the hands, than just the drops, while still remaining legal for mass-start races. Their popularity has since waned.

Dirt drop

Primarily for riding off-road or on dirt, these handlebars are flared out at the ends of the handlebar. This style was used in the 1980s during the early period of mountain biking. Initially the flared portion in these handlebars was bent by hand, but now are available from manufacturers such as Salsa Cycles and SOMA Fabrications.

=== Bullhorn ===
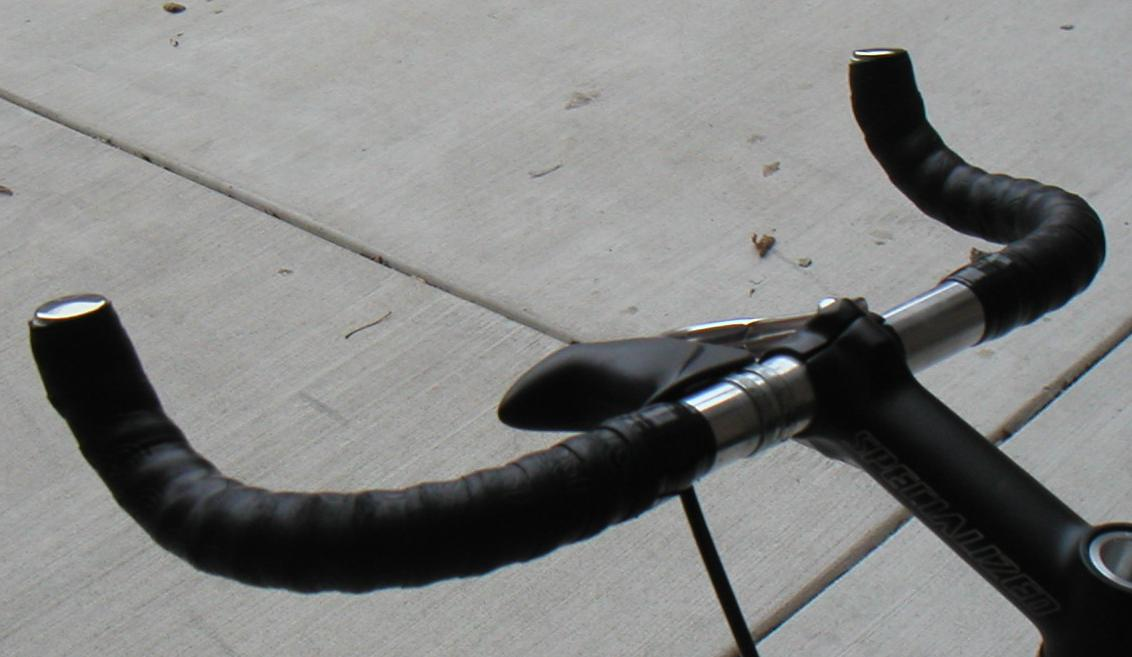
Cut down drop bars repurposed as bullhorn handlebars

Bullhorn (or pursuit) handlebars, curve up and forward. They are often paired with dedicated clip-on triathlon bars when used on the road (see above), and are also popular by themselves on track, single-speed, and fixed-gear bicycles.

This style of handlebar is named after the discipline of track racing where it was originally used, and has the common nickname of "bullhorn bars" for their appearance, especially when the rider's body position is fully extended to lean forward and maintain control of the bicycle.

Improvised bullhorn bars may be constructed simply by cutting the drops off drop bars and then mounting them upside down so that the remaining start of the drop provides a slight upward hook for resting the hands, although this does not provide as much forward extension (reach) or lowering (if desired, normally for time-trial based use) as purpose made bullhorns. These are sometimes called "flopped and chopped" or "flipped and clipped" bars, and if this is to be done, care should be taken to properly remove the sharp edges from the cuts, and to properly tape and plug the bar ends for safety purposes.

=== Bullmoose ===
The bullmoose style was common on early mountain bikes. The stem and bars are a single unit and where the single top section of the stem would be, there are instead 2 bars joined at the quill to the rear and connected to the conventional handlebar section in the front, at two off-center locations, forming a triangle. This type of handlebar is usually very large, allowing for an easy breath intake under stress. However, being heavier than contemporary flat or riser bars and being less customizeable in height and distance from the body of the rider, they progressively disappeared.

=== Flat ===
Flat bars are the standard handlebars equipped on mountain bikes, hybrids, and recently on fixed-gear bicycles and flat bar road bikes. A flat bar is a nearly-straight tube, in most cases slightly bent toward the rider. Many penny-farthings and early safety bicycles had flat handlebars. The angle between the slightly swept-back ends of the handlebar and the axis of the stem clamp is known as the sweep angle.

=== Riser ===
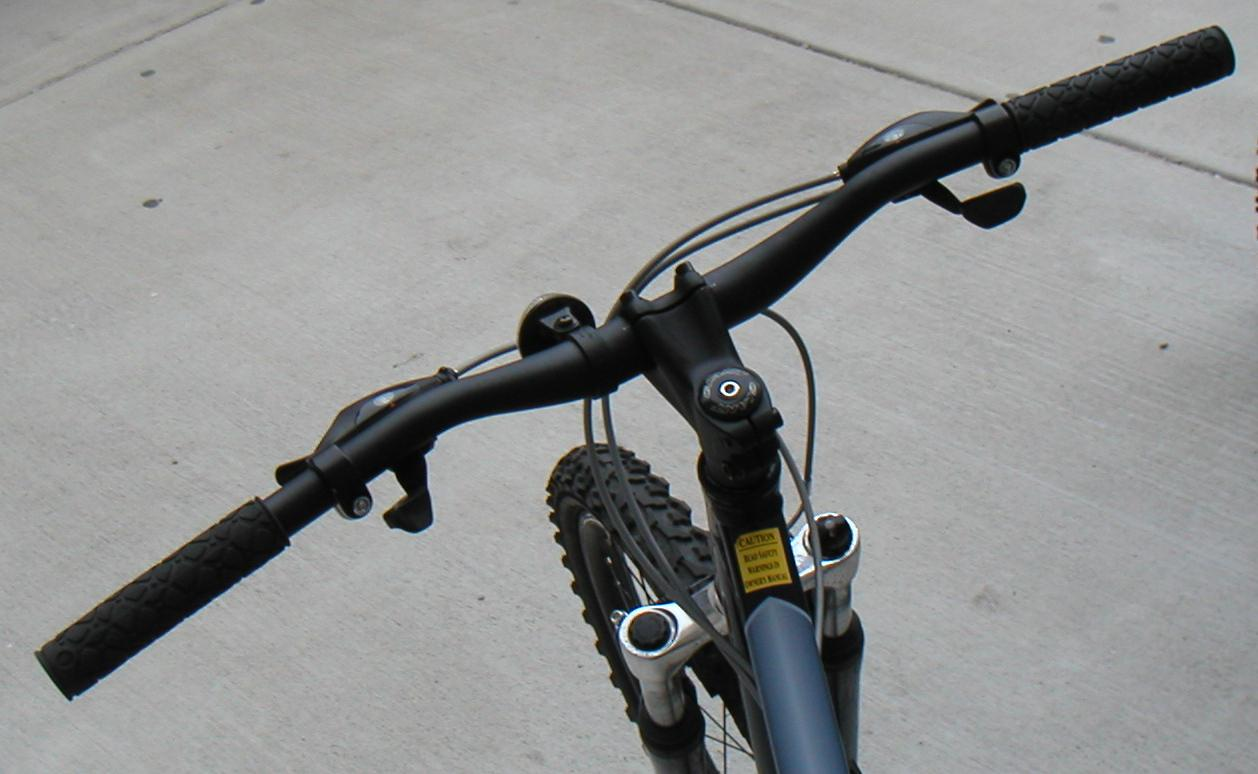
Riser handlebars on a mountain bike

A riser is a variation of the flat bar in which the outer sections of the bars rise from the center clamp area by about 15 to 50 mm. Both flat and riser bars may be appended with bar ends, providing more hand positions.

=== Triathlon or aero bars ===
Triathlon bars or aerobars include various styles of aerodynamic handlebars for racing bicycles and particularly time trial bicycles. Included are narrow, bolt-on extensions that draw the body forward into a tucked position, pursuit bars that spread the arms of the rider but drop the torso into a slightly lower position, and integrated units that combine elements of both designs.

Using aero bars may allow a rider to reduce time on a 40 km time trial by 90 seconds.

Triathlon bars are commonly used in triathlons and time trial events on road and track. However, they are illegal in most mass-start road races or any other event where drafting is permitted because, while aerodynamically advantageous, they tend to draw the hands away from brakes, make the rider slightly more unstable on the bike, and can be dangerous in the event of an accident. Further, they are not useful in sprints or shorter climbs where power is of greater importance than aerodynamics.

Specialized shift levers (known as bar-end shifters) do exist that can be installed on some triathlon bars so that they can be reached without moving the hands from the aerodynamic position. The complementary brake levers in this handlebar configuration are placed in the ends of the accompanying pursuit bars.

Aero bars are a recent addition to road racing time trials, with Greg LeMond first using them in the 1989 Tour de France. In a controversial time trial on the final day, LeMond used them to beat yellow jersey wearer Laurent Fignon by 58 seconds, changing a 50-second deficit into an 8-second lead. Fignon protested at the use of these bars but was unsuccessful.

=== BMX ===
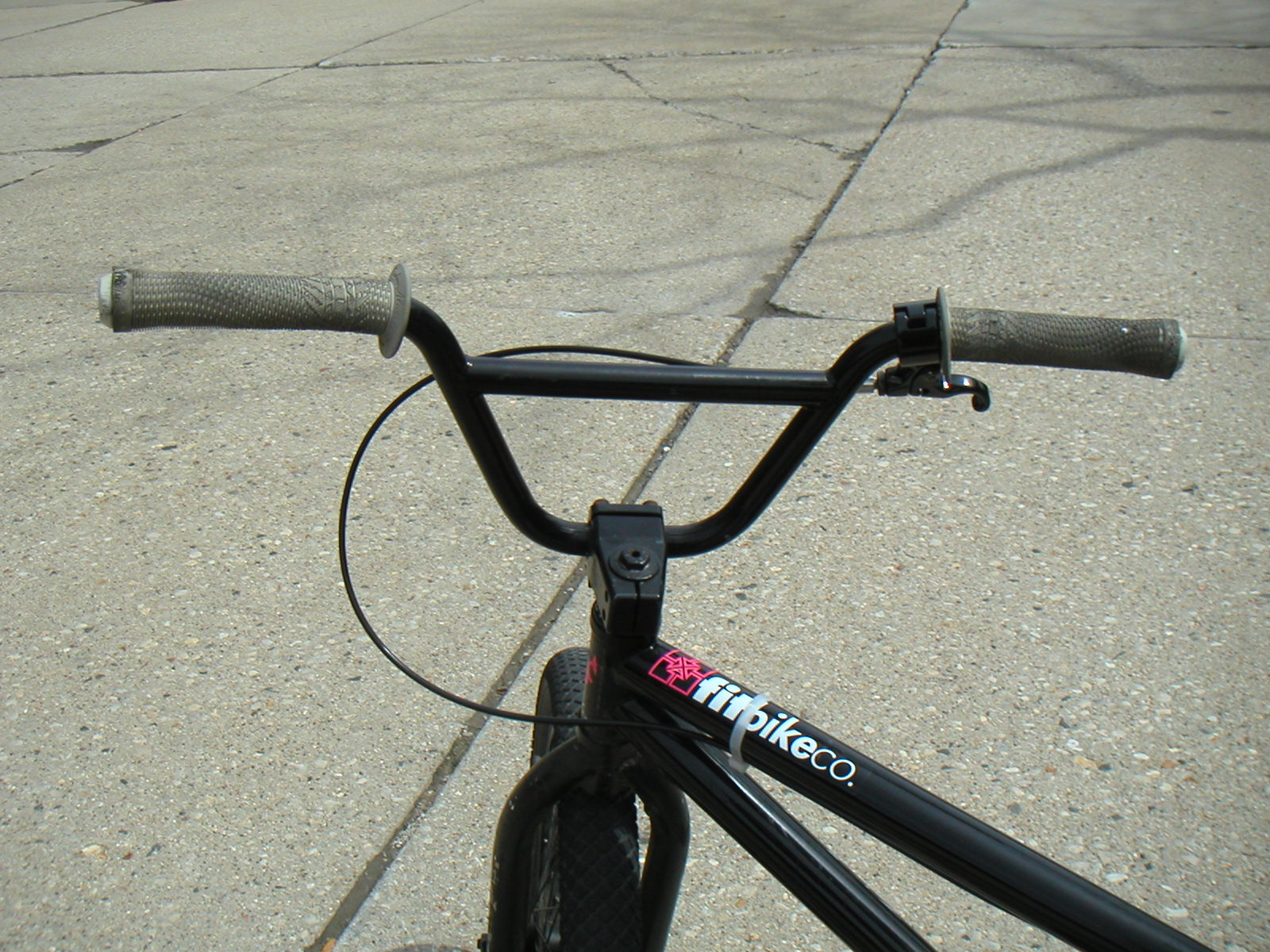
BMX-style bars with cross brace

BMX style handlebars, as used on BMX bicycles, have more rise than straight bars and usually have a cross brace to provide rigidity and strength.

=== Upright or North Road ===
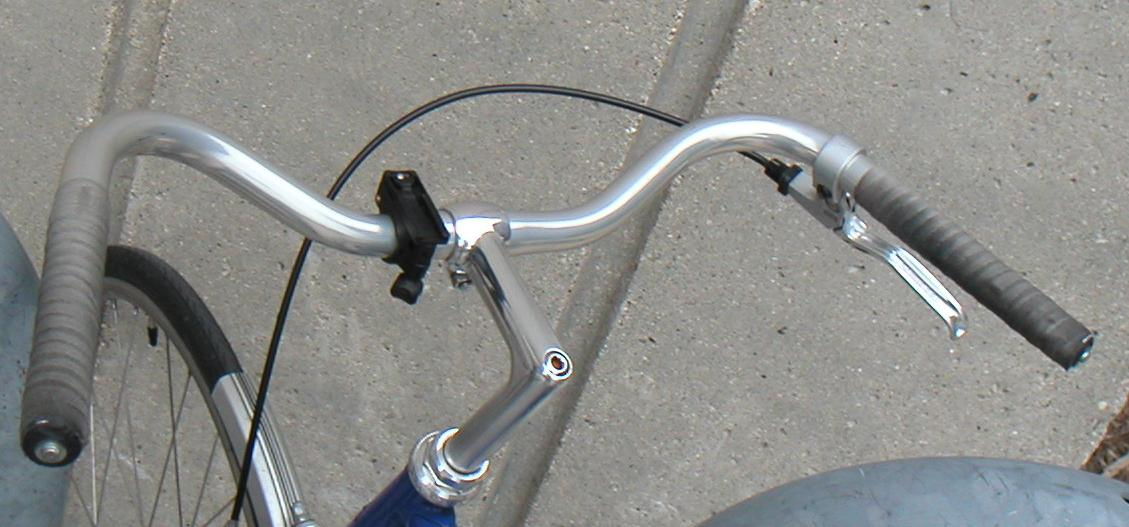
North Road handlebars

One of the oldest type of handlebars, and perhaps the most ubiquitous for town bikes, this type of bar was named after the North Road Cycling Club in London and then used on three-speed and single speed Raleighs, Schwinns, and other three-speed bikes well into the 1980s, as well as various European utility bikes and roadsters. They are also known as "townie", or "tourist" bars. North Road bars are more or less swept back toward the rider; in extreme cases each grip ends nearly parallel to the other and the bike's frame. They have recently enjoyed a resurgence in popularity on some hybrid bicycles, city bikes, and comfort models. North Road bars can easily be inverted to give an approximate ≈4 inch amount of drop when a more aggressive riding posture or a sporty look is desired.

=== Porteur ===
Porteur bars are designed to accommodate front-mounted racks or baskets in order to haul cargo and are usually found on dedicated porteur bicycles. The curve is usually almost flat in the center portion, then sweeps backwards towards the rider with different shapes, and with a slight drop in some cases.

=== Cruiser ===
Cruiser handlebars, as used on cruiser bicycles, tend to be long and slope towards the rear of the bicycle so that the rider can sit upright.

=== Condorino ===
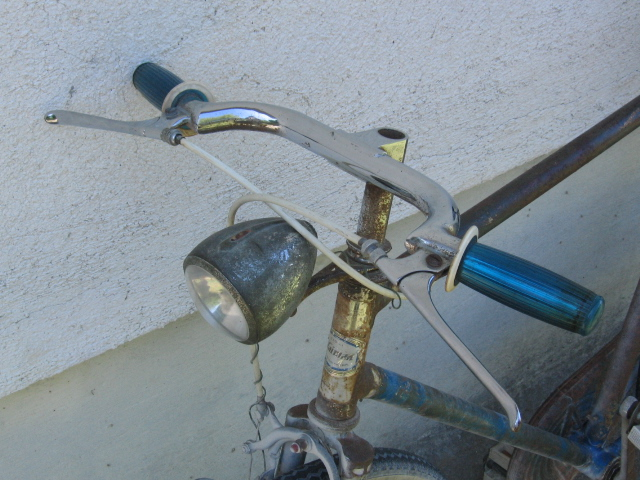
Condorino type handlebar by Legnano, Italy, circa 1960

The condorino bar is bent slightly less than 90° onward, and then 90° outward with a sharp angle. It has no rise and it's much narrower than normal town bikes' bars. It was diffused mostly in Italy from the 1950s onwards, and was marketed to customers wanting a sporty looking bicycle that could still be used for general purpose (going to work, etc.) in years in which a specialized racing bicycle was not affordable by most people. It progressively lost popularity when road racing bikes became common, and by the early 1980s it was out of production.

=== Whatton ===
Whatton bars loop behind the legs of penny-farthing riders so that they can still keep their feet on the pedals and also be able to leap feet-first forward off the machine. These are also used on recumbent bicycles for under-seat steering.

=== Touring or trekking ===
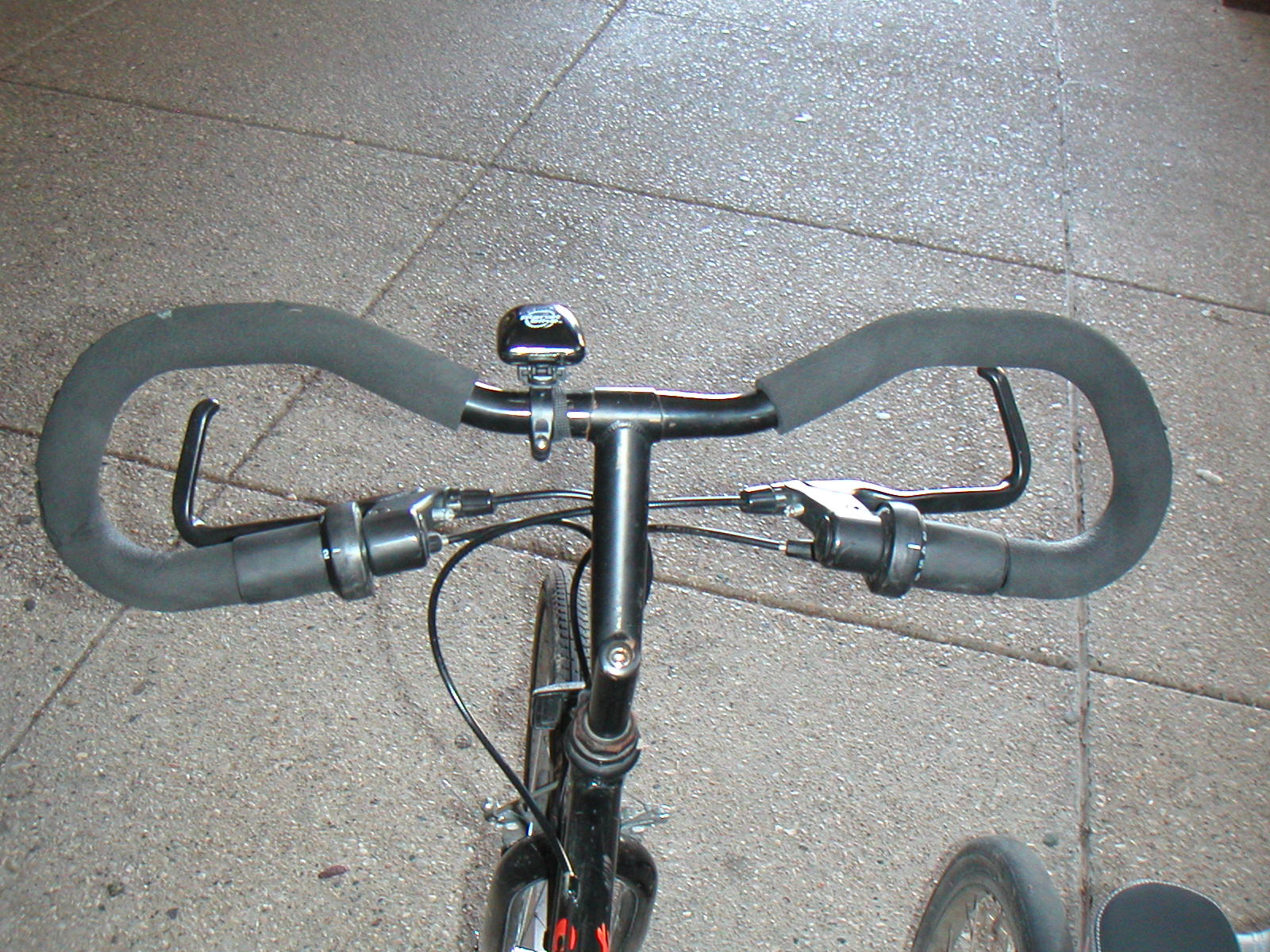
Trekking or "Butterfly" handlebars with foam rubber coverings

Sometimes referred to as "butterfly" bars, these are commonly encountered in continental Europe. They typically consist of a broken figure-of-eight arrangement mounted horizontally on the stem. This style of bar allows the rider to remain relatively upright while at the same time providing a wide range of hand positions for comfort on long duration rides. A variation of the Butterfly bar is fitted to 'P-type' Brompton folding bicycles. It differs from other Butterfly bars in that it is fitted vertically rather than horizontally.

=== Moustache ===
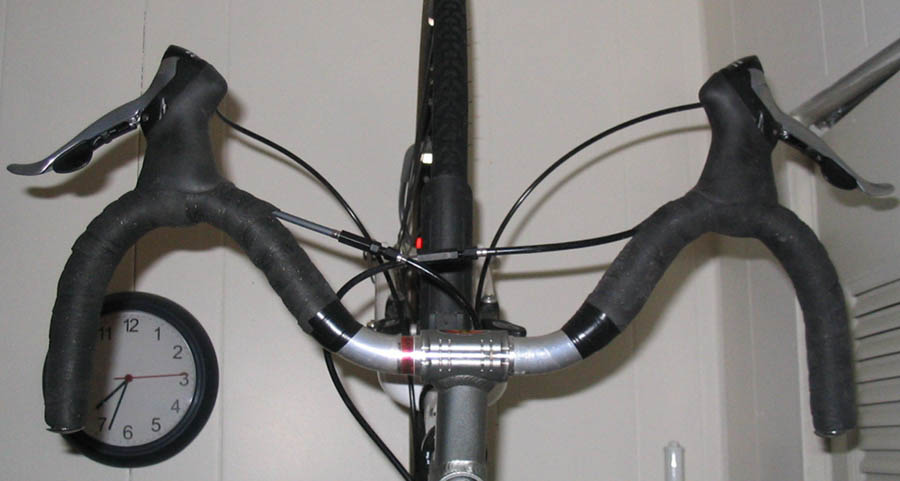
A moustache handlebar as seen from the top of the bike

Moustache handlebars curve forward from the stem and then back towards the rider. This style was designed in the early 90s by Grant Petersen for the Bridgestone XO-1, based on the semi-drop bars used by schoolchildren in Japan.

=== Ape hangers ===
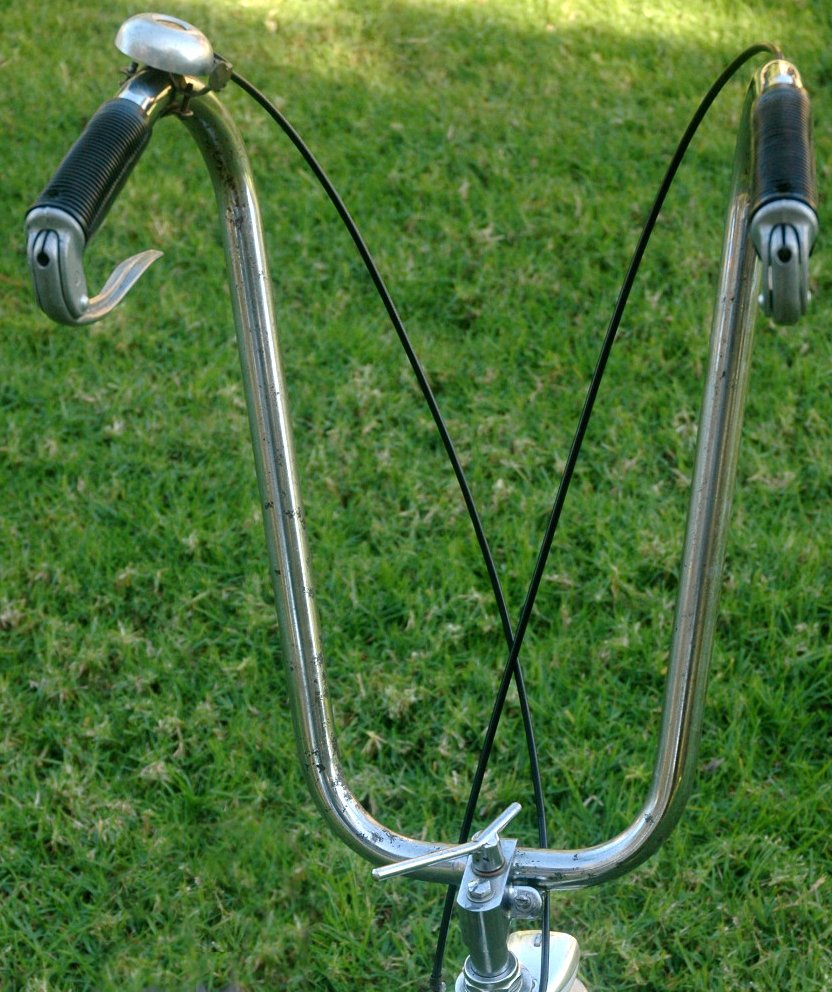
Ape hangers

Ape hanger handlebars rise in a steep U-shape from the base, so that the rider's hands rest above waist-level. This style of bicycle handlebar became very popular in the 1960s after the introduction of wheelie bikes such as the Schwinn Sting-Ray, Raleigh Chopper, and other highly stylized youth bicycles that imitated the appearance of drag-racing or chopper motorcycles of the day. Regulations adopted in 1978 under the Federal Hazardous Substances Act limited the maximum height of manufacturer-installed handlebars to 16 inches (40.64 cm) above the lowest seat setting; European Union safety regulations use a similar limit of 40 cm. Various U.S. states have regulations that vary from 15 to 30 inches above seat height, or shoulder or eye height; some have no restrictions. Ostensibly these regulations are for safety, though some commentators believe these laws are to allow police to have an excuse to pull over motorcyclists suspected to be part of an illegal gang.

The ape hanger style remained common in the US through the mid-1980s, and is still frequently seen on lowrider bicycles.

=== Recumbent ===
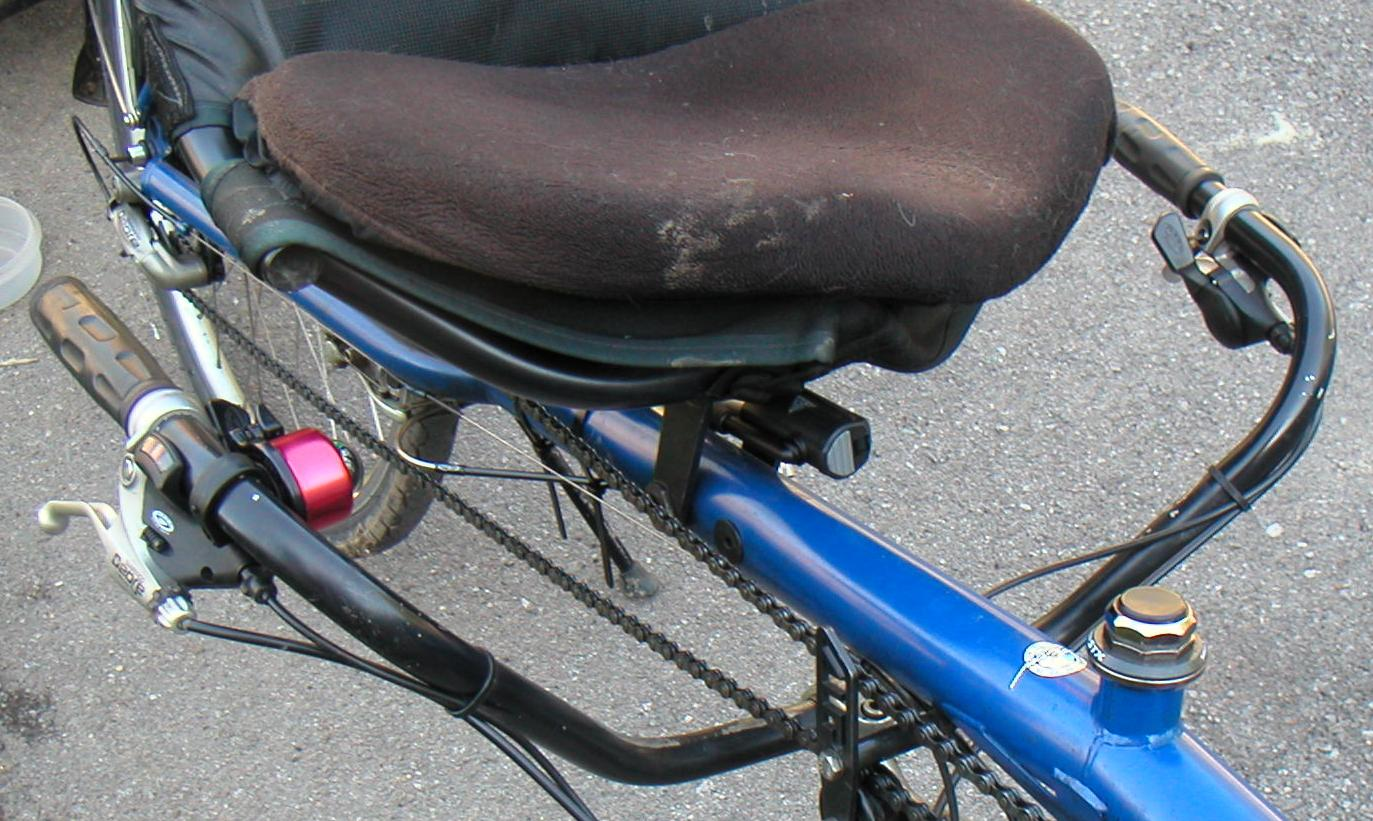
Under seat steering handlebars on a recumbent

Recumbent bicycles, due to their wide variety, are often equipped with handlebars seen nowhere else. These include handlebars with a very far reach, similar to ape hangers (see above) but mounted less vertically, and handlebars designed for under-seat steering, called Whatton bars.

== Design ==
Handlebar design is a trade-off between several desirable qualities:

=== Design goals ===
The design goals of handlebars varies depending on the intended use of the bicycle. Common to all bicycles:

- Providing the necessary leverage to steer the bicycle.
- Proper positioning of the rider's hands according to the purpose and style of the bicycle.
- Providing a mounting platform for brake and gear levers as well as various accessories.

Racing/touring and triathlon bars have additional goals:

- Enabling the rider to assume an aerodynamic position.
- Enabling the rider to change hand and body positions during long rides, preventing fatigue.
- Enabling aerodynamic routing of brake/gear cables.

Mountain bike handlebar design goals have less focus on aerodynamics, more on negotiating terrain:

- Providing enough control to maneuver the front of the bicycle over obstacles.
- Being strong enough to withstand the extra forces generated in some activities/crashes.
- Optionally: not significantly increasing vehicle weight.

BMX and dirt-jump bike bars have similar needs to mountain bikes, with the added incentive of allowing even finer control, such as specific handling during the time the bike is airborne or during certain maneuvers.

=== Materials ===
Handlebars are most commonly made of aluminium alloys, but are also often made from steel, carbon fiber or titanium.

== Sizes ==
There are several size parameters to consider when choosing a handlebar:

=== Width ===
Drop bars come in a variety of widths from 34 to 50 cm (13 to 20 in). Usually a rider will pick a bar that approximately matches their shoulder width so that their arms can be approximately parallel. The width is measured at the end of the drop section but the exact method varies from manufacturer to manufacturer. Some measure from outside edge to outside edge (e.g., Deda, ITM, TTT, Pinarello Most) whereas others measure from center to center (e.g., Cinelli, Profile Design, Ritchey, Salsa). The figure returned by measuring outside to outside tends to be 2 cm (3/4 in) greater than measuring center to center for the same handlebar.

=== Stem clamp diameter ===
Care is needed when choosing a handlebar to match a stem, or vice versa, as there are several standards. The ISO standard for the stem clamping area of a handlebar is 25.4 mm (1 in), which is used on mountain bikes and many Japanese-made road handlebars. However, the Italian unofficial standard is 26.0 mm (1 1/32 in). There are also intermediate sizes such as 25.8 mm (1 1/64 in) that try to achieve compatibility with either an ISO or Italian stem, and the old Cinelli-specific size of 26.4 mm (1 3/64 in). In practice, many modern stems with removable faceplates are quite accommodating of slight differences in handlebar clamp size, but the older type of stem with a single pinch bolt must be accurately matched. In the days of quill stems, a road stem was clearly identifiable from its "7" shape, but nowadays it can be hard to tell the difference between a "road" (26.0 mm [1 1/32 in]) and "MTB" (25.4 mm [1 in]) stem. Manufacturers frequently omit the clamp size from advertising or packaging.

A new standard is an "oversize" 31.8 mm (1.252 in) or 31.7 mm (1.248 in) clamp for both MTB and road bars. This is popular on mountain bikes, especially those with a focus on "all mountain" and "downhill" activities, as the stem and handlebars can be both stiffer and lighter. This clamp diameter is taking over from the previous mix of sizes on road bicycles with drop-bars. On these stems, standard brake levers can be used as it is only the central section that is oversized although other accessories that mount near the stem also need to be oversized to fit (some brackets are adjustable). Shims are available to fit either a 25.4 mm (1 in) or 26 mm (1 1/32 in) bar to a 31.8 mm (1.252 in) stem, so many new models of stems are oversize-only.

In 2012 bar manufacturer Easton also launched the 35 mm (1 3/8 in) size for bars and stems. This is specifically developed for high load applications such as downhilling. Easton are claiming further increases in strength and stiffness while reducing weight.

BMX style handlebars require a clamp diameter of 22.2 mm (7/8 in) and are therefore incompatible with any non-BMX specific stem.

=== Lever clamp and grip diameter ===
In addition to the stem clamp area, the shifter and/or brake lever and grip area on a bar can have several different diameters. For traditional road and mountain handlebars, these diameters are standard and so there has historically been little confusion except when mixing road and mountain components. However, in recent years there have been cross-over bar types that do not fall into one category or the other, and which can conceivably use either type of shifter, brake lever or grip (an example is the upright style bar). For this reason, certain handlebars are now available in multiple sizes related to the shifter or brake lever clamp diameter.

Standard road drop handlebars (including track, cyclocross and touring bars) use a 23.8 mm (15/16 in) grip/lever diameter, which is matched only to road bike type shifters or brake levers. This diameter is usually not important for grips since these bars most often are wrapped in tape. An exception are one-piece track grips, which are sized to fit the 23.8 mm (15/16 in) bar diameter (and, therefore, would not fit a mountain bike handlebar). Cyclocross brake levers are sized to fit drop style bars, and would also not fit a mountain bike handlebar.

The other common lever/grip size is used for mountain and city handlebars, including flat bars, riser bars, some porteur bars, etc. On these bars the lever and grip areas have a 22.2 mm (7/8 in) diameter. Hence, thumb shift levers, grip type shifters, MTB brake levers and Rapidfire type shifters will only fit on this smaller diameter - none could fit on a road or cyclocross bar.

== Handlebar coverings ==
Handlebars usually have tape or grips to provide grip and comfort. In general, handlebars which have one riding position have grips, and handlebars which provide several use tape.

=== Tape ===
There are many types of handlebar tape:

- Polyurethane tape, introduced in the last few years, provides cushioning.
- Composite rubber tape
- Cork tape, padded tape, provides cushioning but less durable.
- Bike ribbon, plastic padded tape with smooth waterproof surface.
- Benotto "Cello-Tape", made from plastic, popular in the 1970s and 1980s. Compared with other types of handlebar tape it is relatively thin and is unpadded; it does not provide any cushioning from road vibrations. However it is long lasting, does not absorb water, was available in a vast range of colors and stays clean. Similar types of "shiny tape" exist.
- Cotton tape, unpadded woven cotton tape with adhesive backing, similar to twill tape.
- Leather wrap, for example by Brooks England
- An inner tube can be cut and wrapped as well
- A foam rubber tube has been used on inexpensive bikes.

Tape can be applied in several ways, either wrapped from the ends towards the stem or starting near the stem and wrapped towards the ends. The tape is usually held in place at the ends with the bar-end plugs. The other end of the tape can be held in place with adhesive tape, usually electrical insulation tape or, if started near the stem, by first wrapping a few turns towards the stem before reversing direction to anchor it. A figure-eight can be made around the brake lever clamp to completely cover the bar, or a separate small piece of tape can be placed on the back side to cover the small v-shaped section that might otherwise be left bare. Strips of bar gel may optionally be applied to the handlebars prior to applying the tape in order to reduce vibration transmission and increase comfort.

=== Grips ===
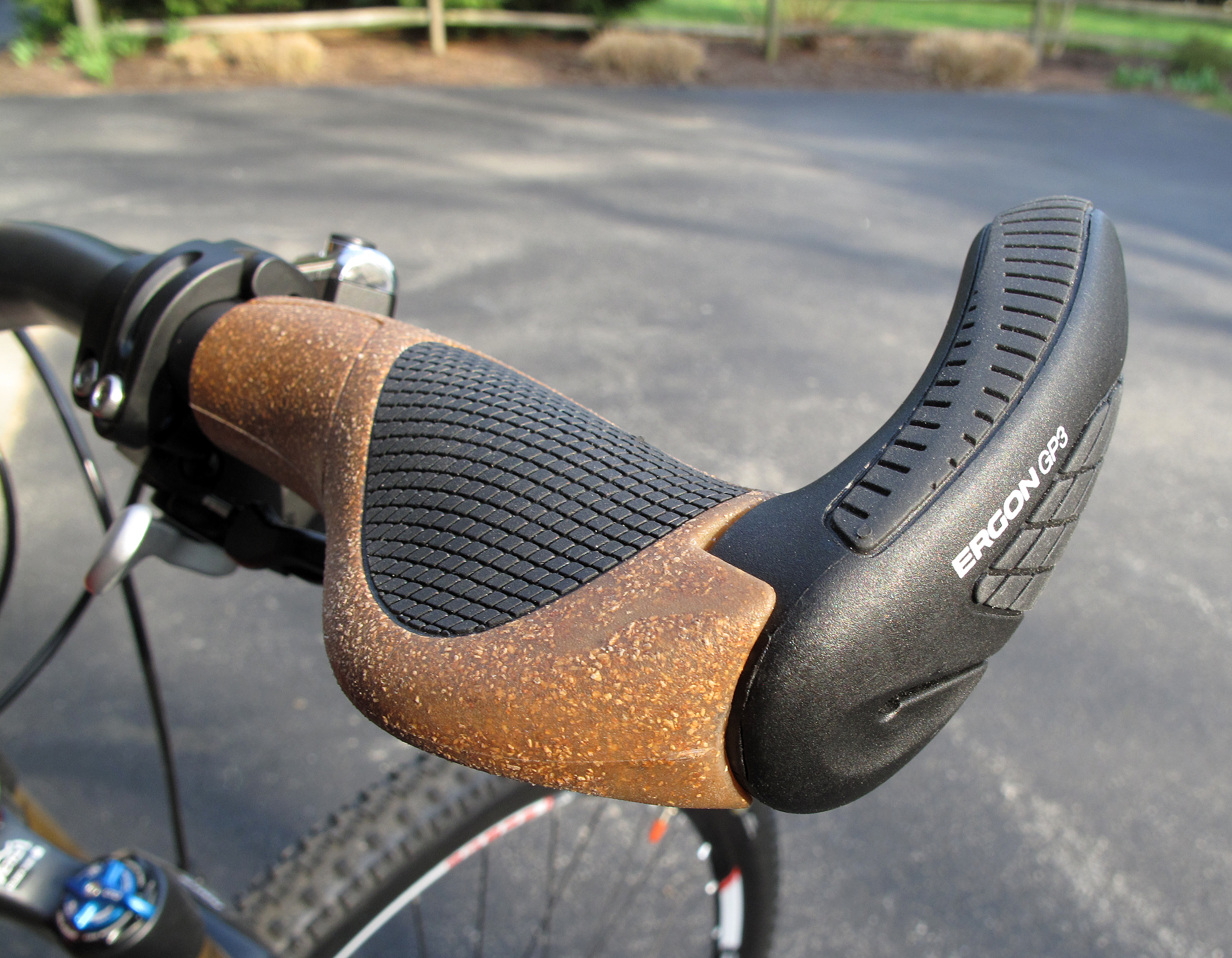
Combined ergonomic grip and bar end

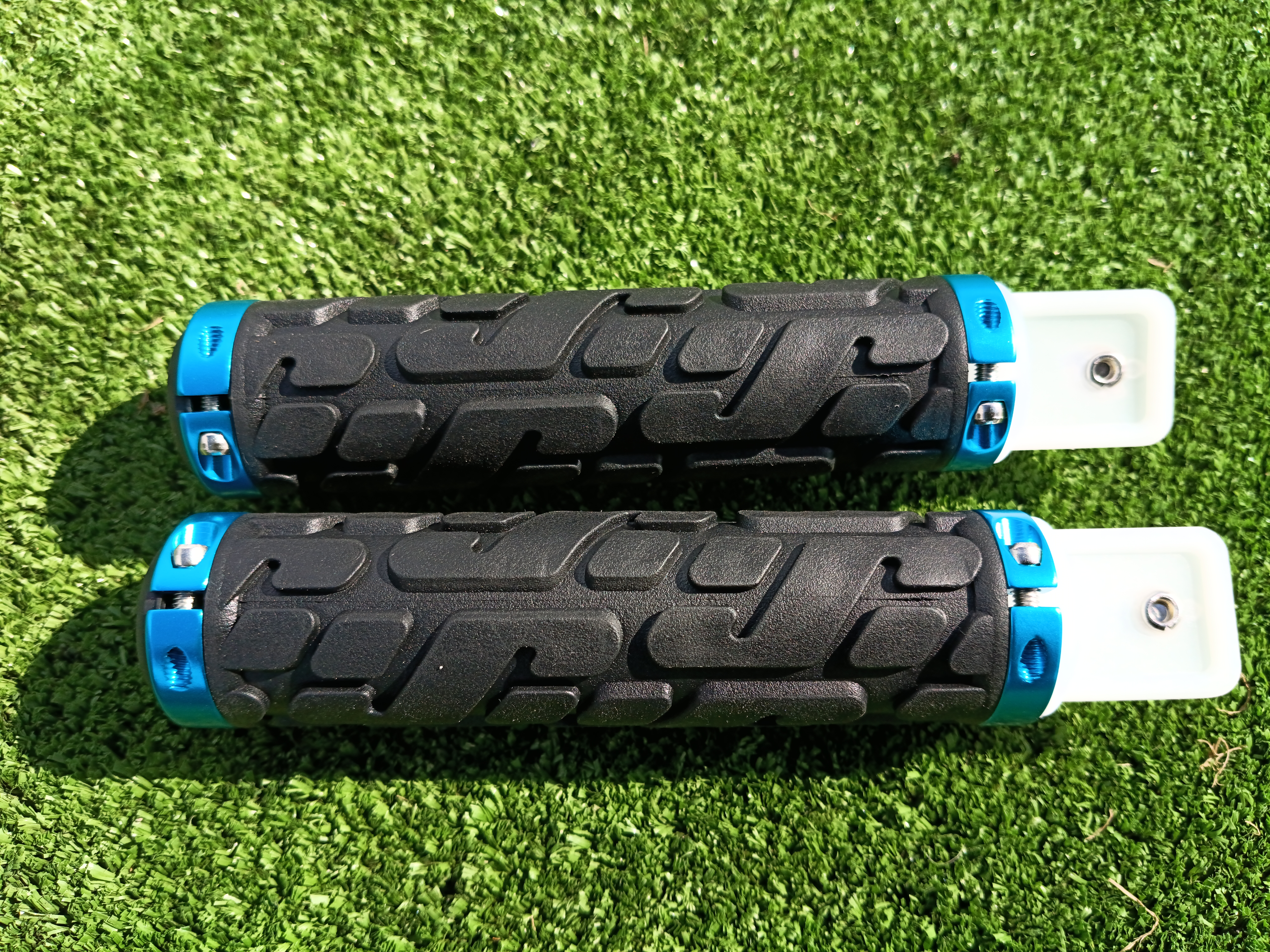
Pair of lock-on bicycle handlebar grips with dual screw-tightened end clamps.

Grips are usually made of firm or soft plastic, foam, gel, or sometimes leather, depending on expected use or desired price. They may be simply smooth and round or molded to fit the shape of a human hand better. They typically can be installed either by friction (slip-on) fits or by screw (lock-on) mechanism.

Foam grips can be applied by submerging them under water and then inflate them with 200 kPa (2 bar; 30 psi) air while massaging them onto the handlebar. A quick way of fitting foam grips is to spray the ends of the bars liberally with hair spray and then slide on the grips and adjust their rotation quickly; leaving them alone, the hair spray will soon fix them in position. Plastic grips can be heated in water and punched onto the handlebar. Finally, a small amount of isopropyl (rubbing) alcohol may be applied to the bar surface during removal or installation of grips in order to provide lubrication, which when allowed to dry, leaves no residue.

=== Plugs ===
Handlebars with open ends should have handlebar plugs fitted in the open ends for safety reasons. These can be made of metal, usually steel, or plastic. Without them, the end of the bar can cause serious injury upon hard impact with soft tissue. Plugs are also required by competitive cycling governing bodies.

== Bar ends ==
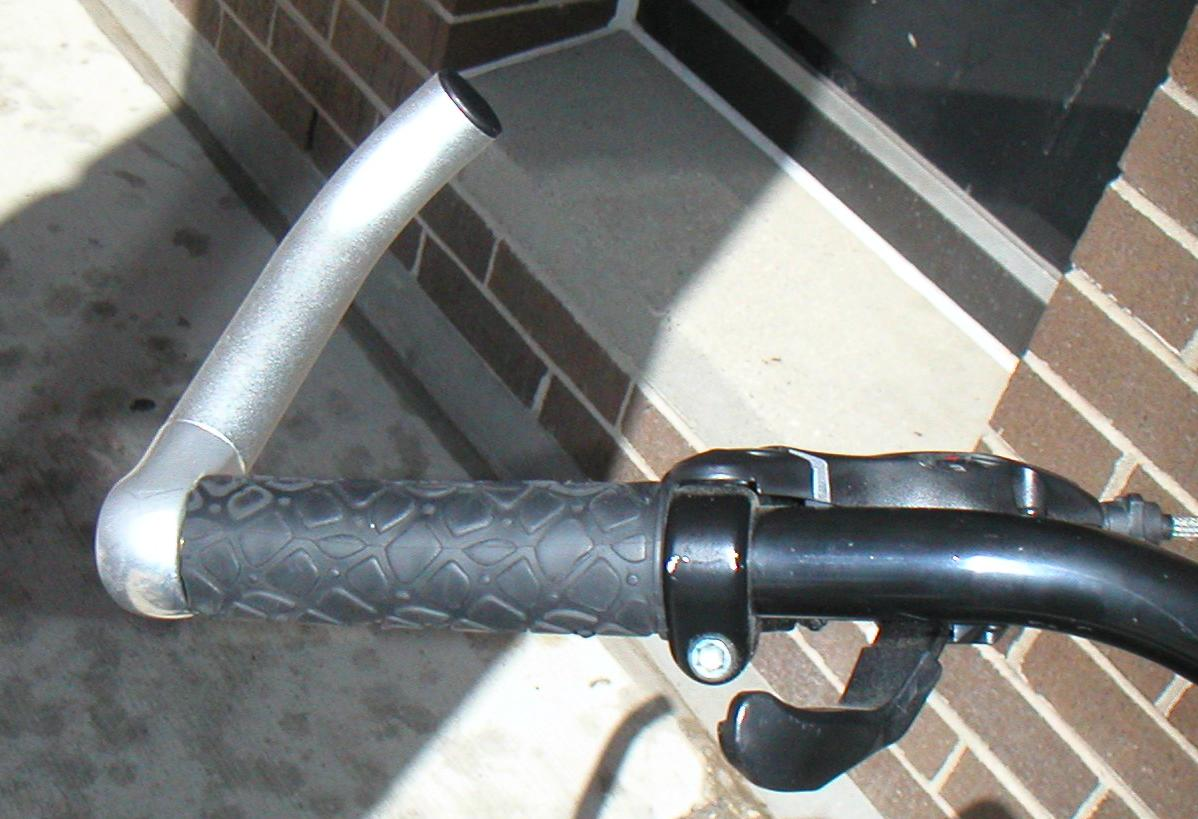
Single (left) bar end

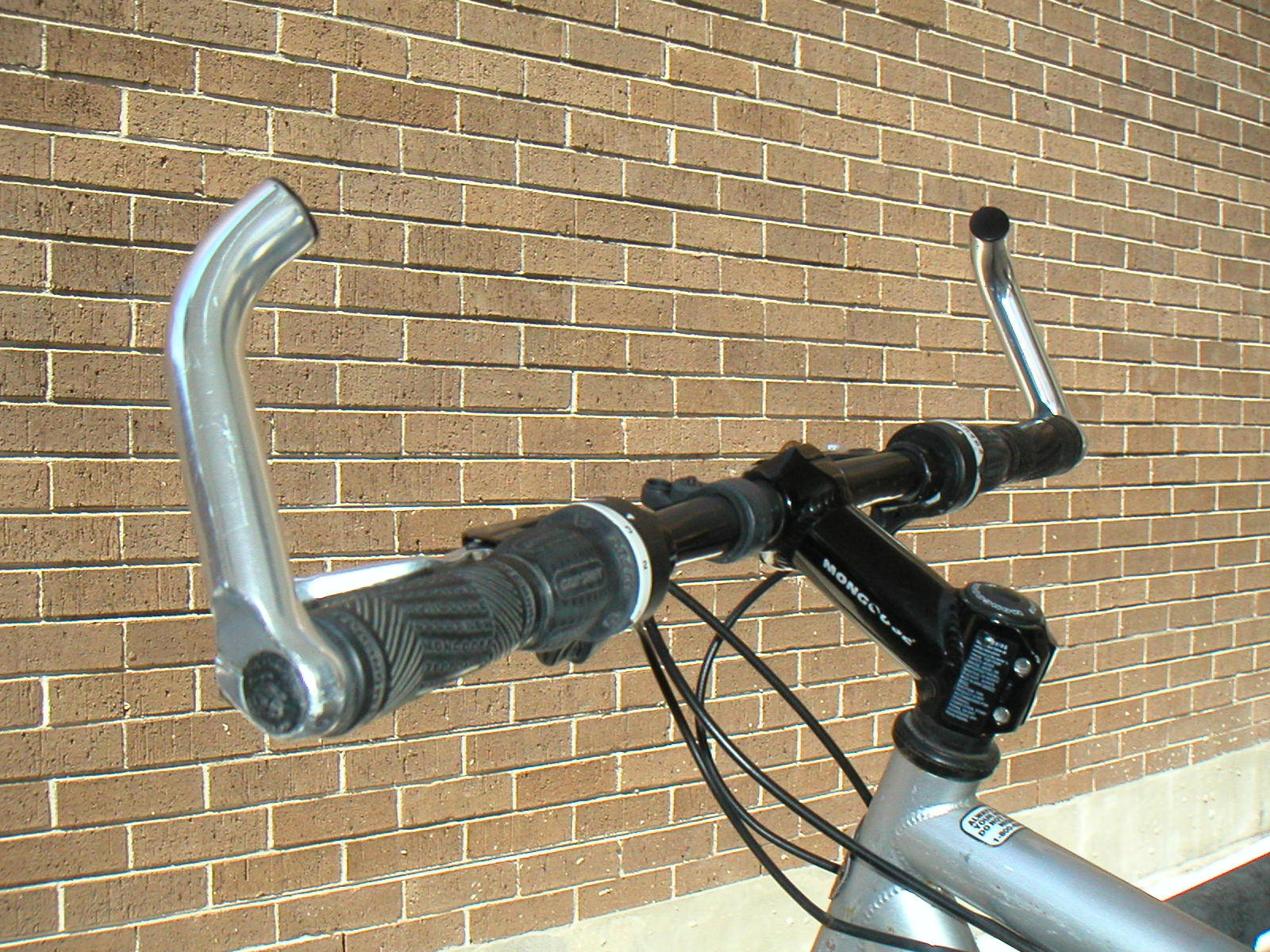
Pair of bar ends

In cycling, bar ends are extensions typically fitted to the ends of straight handlebars. They extend away from the handlebars and allow the rider to vary the type of grip and posture that they use during a ride. They are especially effective when climbing out of the saddle, because they increase leverage. Bar ends can also improve comfort for the rider due to the neutral position of the hands (palms inward) which places marginally less stress upon the musculature, and by providing more than one place to rest hands on a long journey. Bar ends can be useful for hanging bags on the ends of bicycle handles.

Some handlebars have bar ends welded onto them but most are clamped to the end of the bar. They are available in many shapes and sizes, such as stubby models that are around 100 mm in length to ones that curve around so as to provide even more hand positions. It is also possible to purchase combined ergonomic hand grips with integrated bar-ends.

Bar ends were popular on mountain bikes from the early 1990s until the late 1990s, when upswept "riser bars" came back into fashion. The combination of riser bars and bar ends is rarely seen.

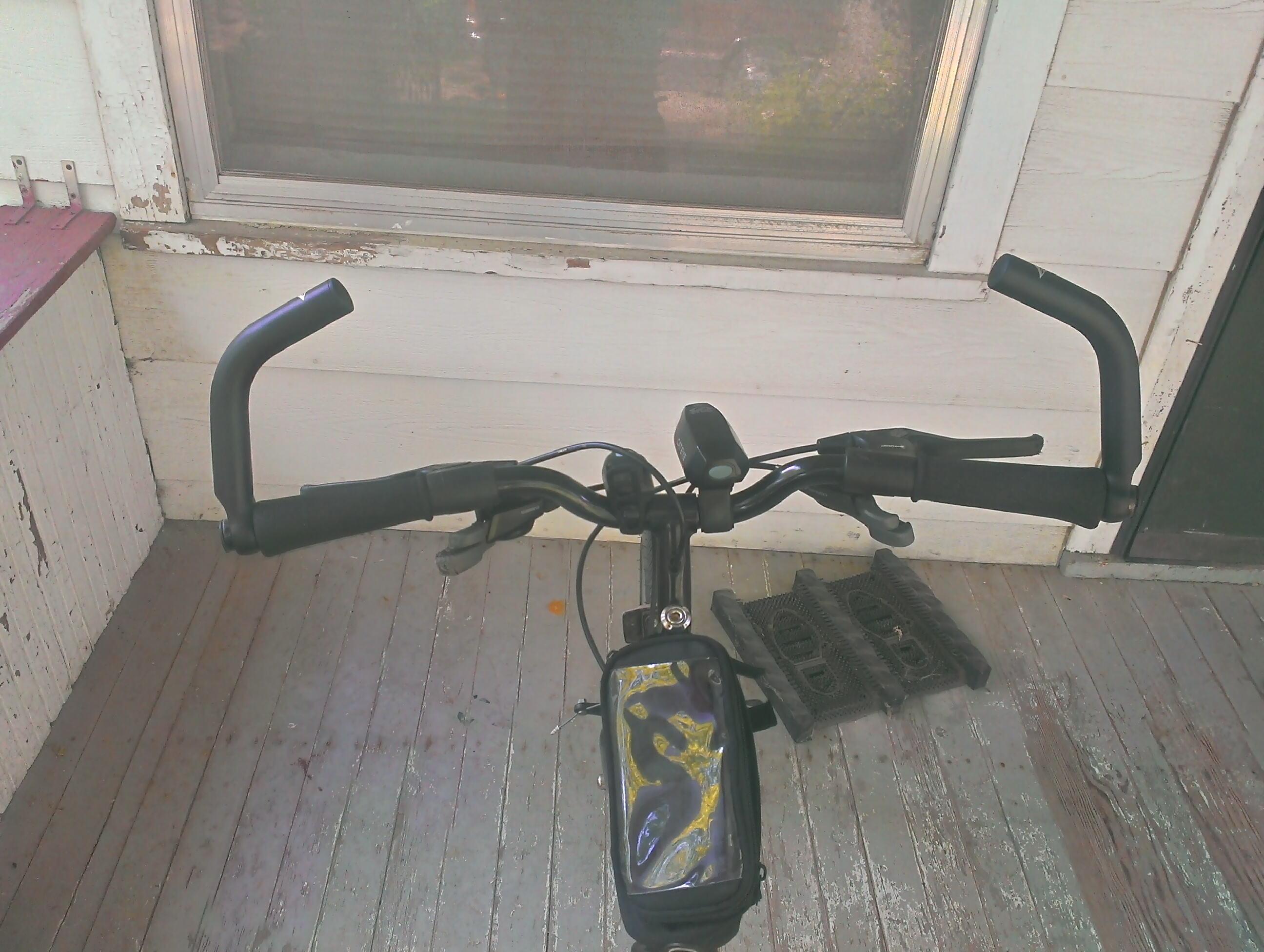
Pair of full curve bar ends

Bar ends can prove troublesome when negotiating twisty tracks between trees as they may hook around branches and cause a crash. They also afford some protection to a rider's hands in a fall or crash. However, by moving the hands further from the brake levers, they can increase the time it takes to stop a bicycle.

Use of bar ends is forbidden by road racing regulatory bodies. Accidents can easily be caused by hooking other riders' handlebars during tight bunch-riding and additionally bar ends may cause severe injuries during collisions that not infrequently occur in that discipline.

== See also ==
- Bicycle fork
- Outline of cycling
- Motorcycle handlebar
- Stem (bike)
