= Bicycle bell =

Accessory on bikes used for warning others

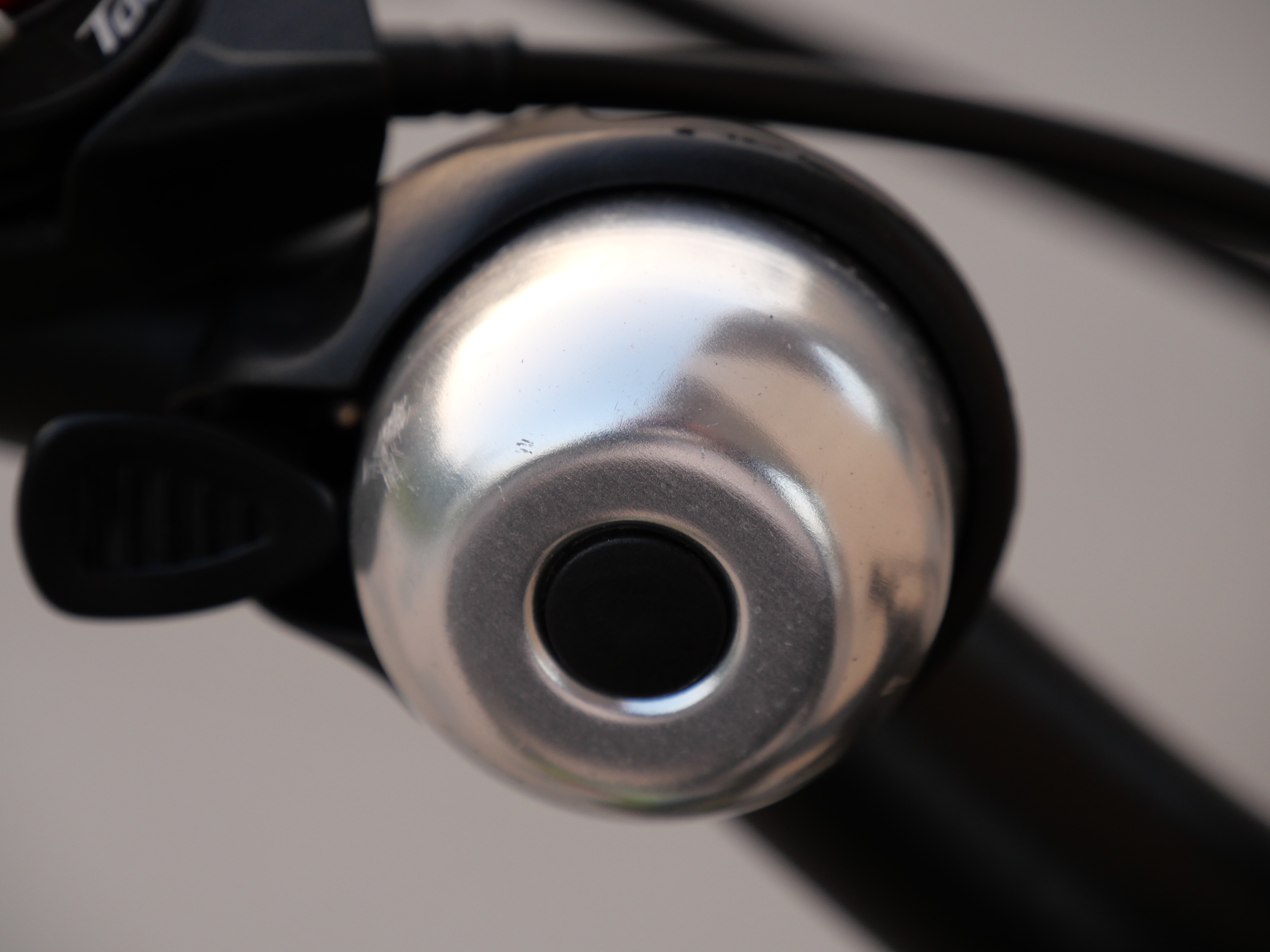
Silver bicycle bell mounted on handlebar

Classic bell of a bicycle

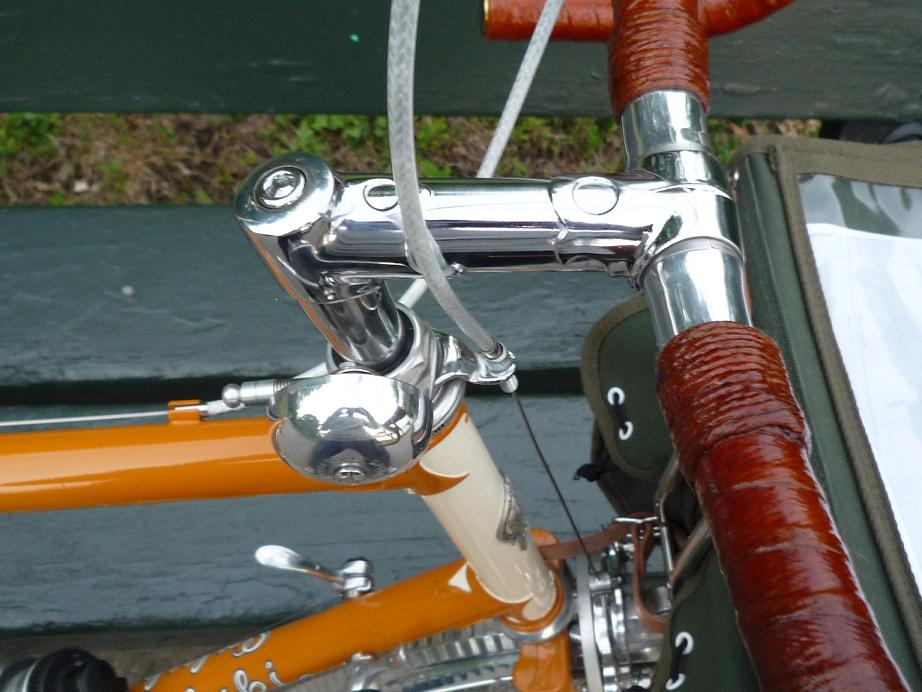
Bicycle bell mounted on the stem

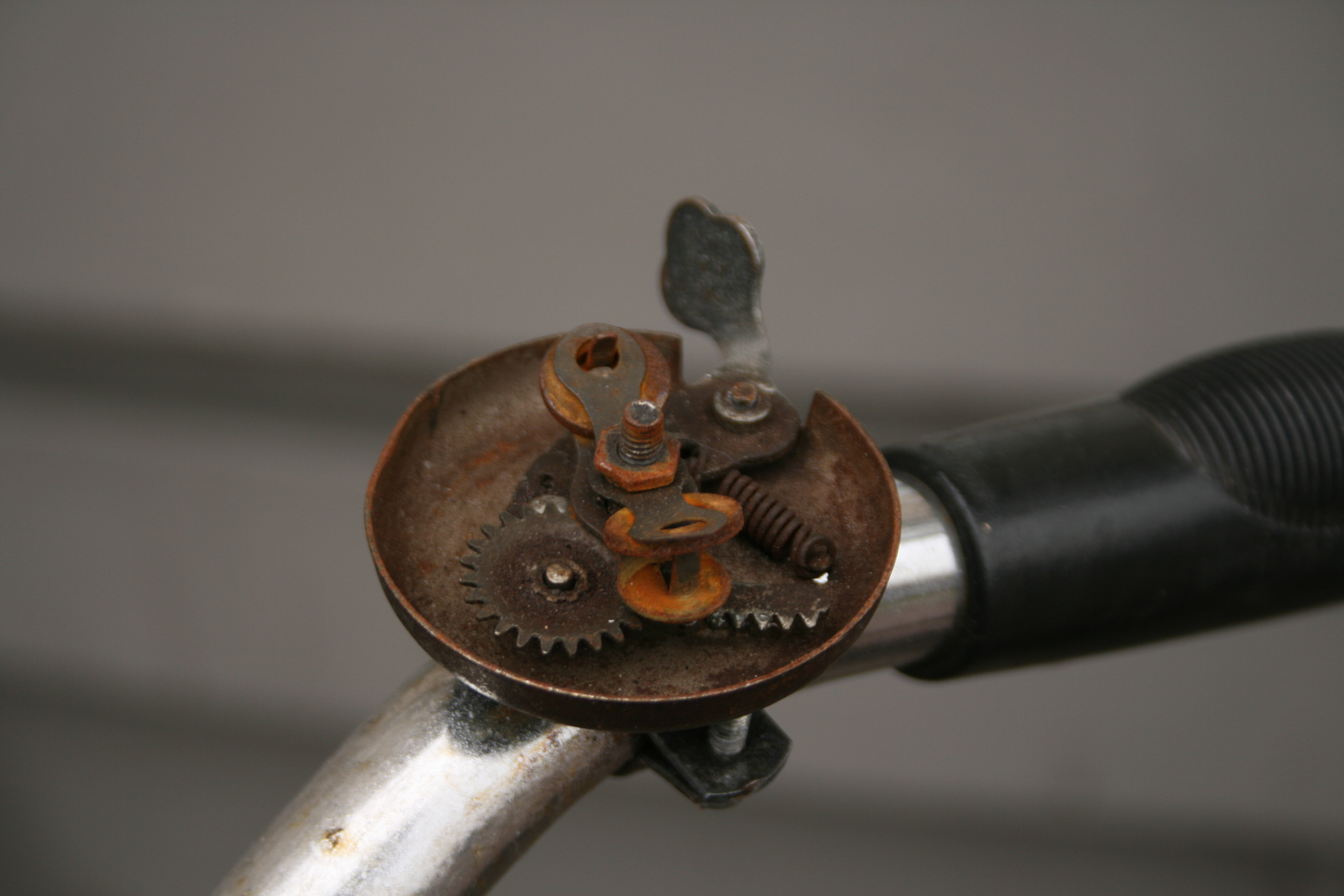
Bicycle bell internal view

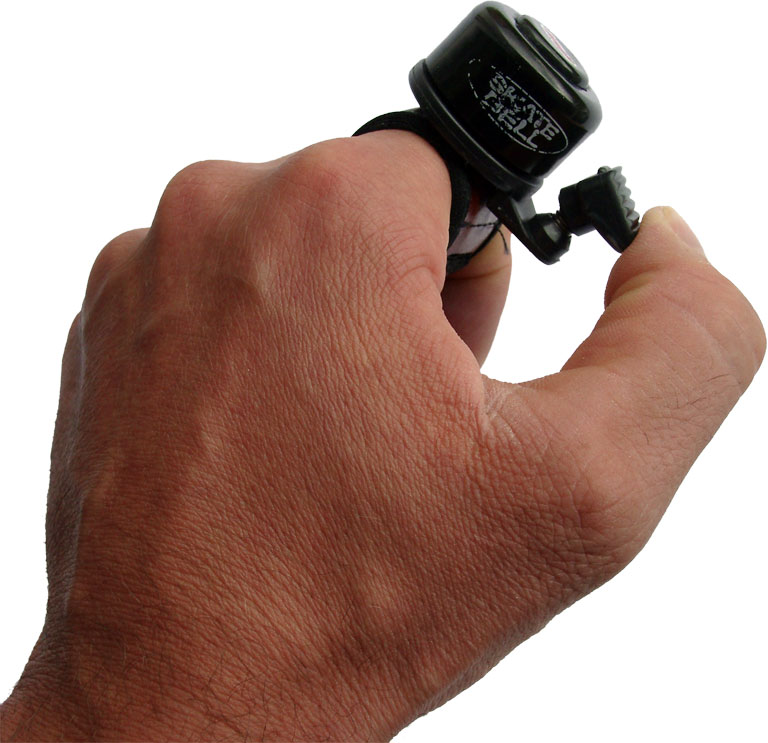
Bicycle bell with external clapper

A bicycle bell is a percussive signaling instrument mounted on a bicycle for warning pedestrians and other cyclists. They are usually mounted on the handlebars and thumb activated.

== History ==
The bicycle bell was invented by John Richard Dedicoat, and patents for bicycle bells appear as early as 1877.

== Types ==
The most common bells are actuated by a thumb-operated lever that is geared to rapidly rotate two loosely slung metal discs inside the bell housing. Said discs repeatedly rattle and strike the bell to produce a sound not unlike that of an electric bell. This type of bell comes in left and right handed versions. Left handed versions are mounted on the left side of the handle bars and are used in countries that drive on the left hand side of the road. The right hand is then free to give traffic signals.

Simpler types also exist, with a spring-mounted external clapper that creates a "ding-ding" sound when the clapper is pulled with a finger and released. Some bells, particularly these "ping" types, work poorly in rainy conditions because water drops clinging to the bell damp the vibrations which produce sound.

== Regulations ==
The bell is a required piece of equipment in some jurisdictions.

In the United Kingdom, bells on new bikes were compulsory until 1983, and again since 1 May 2011.

In New Jersey, a bicycle must be equipped with a bell or other audible device that can be heard at least 100 feet away, but not a siren or whistle.

In Ontario, a bike must have a bell or horn in good working order.

In Western Australia, a person riding a bicycle must have a bell or similar warning device.

In the Czech Republic, bells or other signalling device were required until 1 August 2002.

- From the turn of the 19th and 20th centuries, local police regulations for cyclists for individual cities are known (Prague 1893 and 1896, České Budějovice 1905). Both these documents required velocipedes to be equipped with a warning bell. However, the rules from České Budějovice allowed to give sound signals also with a whistle.
- Czechoslovak ordinance 145/1958 Ú. l. (§ 49/2) stipulated that bicycles must be equipped by a clear-sounding bell audible at a sufficient distance; other audible warning devices were prohibited for bicycles.
- Czechoslovak federal ordinance 32/1972 Sb. (§ 76/2/h) stipulated that bicycles must be equipped by a clear-sounding bell audible at a sufficient distance. Bells were allowed as the signalling device also for single-track motor vehicles with a cylinder capacity of up to 50 cm^{3} and with a maximum design speed of up to 40 km/h (§ 55/1).
- Czechoslovak federal ordinance 90/1975 Sb. (§ 76/2/h) stipulated that bicycles must be equipped by a clear-sounding bell audible at a sufficient distance. Bells were allowed as the signalling device also for single-track motor vehicles with a cylinder capacity of up to 50 cm^{3} and with a maximum design speed of up to 40 km/h (§ 55/1).
- Czechoslovak federal ordinance 41/1984 Sb. (§ 73/1/h) stipulated that bicycles must be equipped by a clear-sounding bell audible at a sufficient distance; bicycles for preschool children may be equipped with a sound signaling device other than a bell. Bells were allowed also for mopeds (§ 54/1).
- Czech ordinance 102/1995 Sb. (§ 99/1/h) stipulated that bicycles must be equipped by a clear-sounding bell audible at a sufficient distance; bicycles for preschool children may be equipped with a sound signaling device other than a bell. Bells were allowed also for small motorcycles of L1 category (§ 67/1).
- Ordinance 301/2001 Sb. (§ 16/1/b) stated as a condition for the operation of a bicycle on roads (of all categories) to be equipped with a clear-sounding bell or similar device ("jasně znějícím zvonkem nebo obdobným zařízením").
- Later ordinances of the Ministry of Transport 341/2002 Sb. since 1 August 2002 (appendix 13), 341/2014 Sb. (appendix 12 chapter C), 153/2023 Sb. (appendix 8) don't require acoustic signalling device for bicycles and similar vehicles.

== As a musical instrument ==
Bicycle bells have also been used as musical instruments in such notable recordings as "You Still Believe in Me" on Pet Sounds by The Beach Boys and "Bicycle Race" by Queen and more.

== See also ==
- Bicycle horn
