= Road bicycle =

Bicycles designed for traveling at speed on paved roads

Road bike.

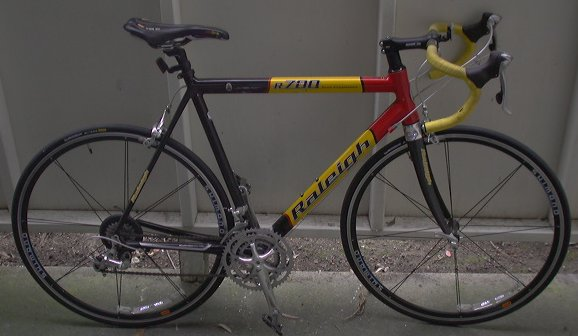
An aluminum road bicycle made by Raleigh and built using Shimano components. It uses wheels with a low spoke count for reduced air drag.

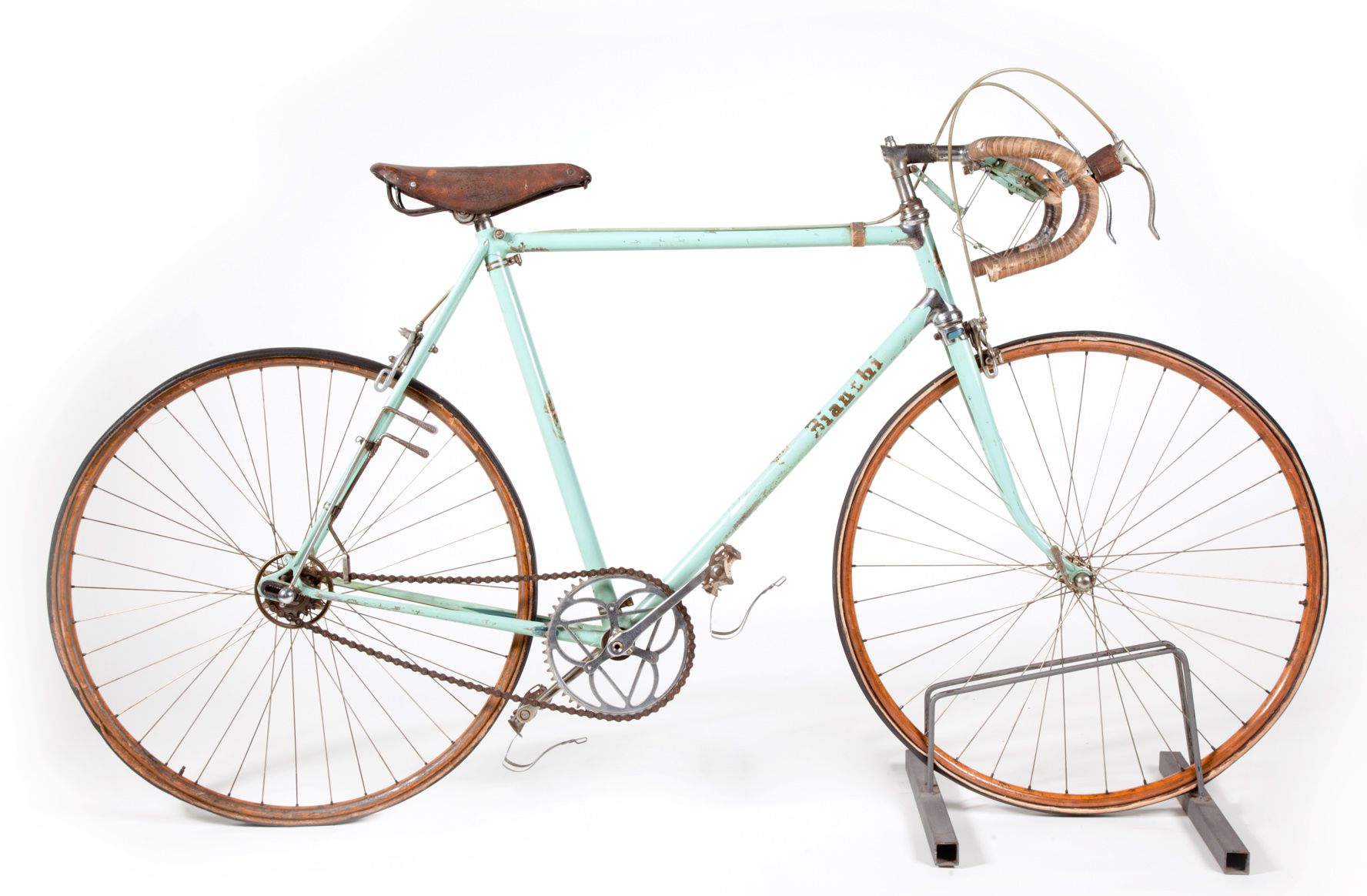
The steel frame racing bicycle by the Italian company Bianchi used by Fausto Coppi to win the 1949 Milan–San Remo race.

The term road bicycle is used to describe bicycles built for traveling at speed on paved roads. Some sources use the term to mean racing bicycle. Other sources specifically exclude racing bicycles from the definition, using the term to mean a bicycle of a similar style but built more for endurance and less the fast bursts of speed desired in a racing bicycle; as such, they usually have more gear combinations and fewer hi-tech racing features. Certain of these bicycles have been referred to as 'sportive' bicycles to distinguish them from racing bicycles.

Compared to other styles of bicycle, road bicycles share common features:

- The tires are narrow, high-pressure, and smooth to decrease rolling resistance
- The handlebars are bent ("dropped") to allow the rider position to be leaned forward and downward, which reduces the forward vertical cross-sectional area and thus highly reduces the air resistance
- They usually use derailleur gears; however, single-speed and fixed-gear varieties exist (which often are used city-wide, due to simple maintenance from their simple designs).
- They either use disc brakes or rim brakes (although there might be technical differences, for example, road bike calliper brakes use shorter and wider pads than mountain bike cantilevers)
- The bicycle is of lightweight construction using materials such as aluminium alloys or carbon fibre.
- They usually use clipless pedals and special shoes in contrast to flat pedals, usually installed on mountain bikes.

The term road bicycle can also describe any type of bike used primarily on paved roads, in contrast to bikes primarily intended for off-road use, such as mountain bikes. Several variations of road bikes include:

- Touring bicycles are designed for bicycle touring: they are robust, comfortable, and capable of carrying heavy loads
- Hybrid bicycles are designed for a variety of recreational and utility purposes. While primarily intended for use on pavement, they may also be used on relatively smooth unpaved paths or trails.
- Utility bicycles are designed for utility cycling: are a traditional bicycle for commuting, shopping and running errands in towns and cities.
  - A roadster is a specific form of utility bicycle developed in the UK.
- Recumbent bicycles are designed for a variety of recreational and utility purposes, but are characterised by the reclined riding position in which the cyclist is seated.
- Vintage road bicycles, also known as classic lightweight bicycles, are generally older bicycles with frames which are manufactured using steel tubing and lugs. Certain examples of this bicycle type have become collector's items, with potential values of several thousand dollars. Other cyclists prefer this type of bicycle to those manufactured using modern techniques because they are "practical, versatile, durable, repairable, and timeless, regardless of current popular trends."
- An endurance bike, also known as a sportive bike, is a type of road bicycle designed specifically for long-distance riding and comfort. Unlike traditional road racing bikes, endurance bikes have a more relaxed geometry that allows for a more upright riding position.
- A flat bar road bike, also called a fitness bike, is a relatively new style of bicycle. It is simply a road bike fitted with a flat handlebar and MTB-style shifters and brake levers. This combination provides a light, fast bike with a more upright riding position that is more comfortable and gives a better view in traffic. Flat bar road bike are commonly used for commuting, urban and fitness riding.

== See also ==
- Racing bicycle
- Outline of cycling
