= Flat bar road bike =

Hybrid bicycle

A flat bar road bike, also called a fitness bike, is a hybrid bike optimized for road usage or a road bike with a flat handlebar in place of a drop bar.

Frame construction and geometry borrow significantly from conventional road design. The frame is constructed to a light or middleweight standard with a shape that promotes an aggressive, aerodynamic posture suited to riding at higher speeds. There is no conventional suspension for either wheel, though the front fork may use carbon or steel to quell vibration. Wheel size is almost universally 700c with a width of 28 mm to 32 mm, somewhat wider than the 23 mm to 28 mm road bike standard.

The drivetrain of a flat bar bike often borrows features from multiple bike styles, pairing the trigger-shifting approach of mountain bikes with the taller cassette ratios of road bikes. The brakes of purpose-built flat-bar designs tend to be linear-pull, a mechanism nonexistent in road bikes and largely displaced by discs with mountain bikes. Disc brake penetration in road cycling continues to increase, however, with flat bar and cyclocross bikes leading the curve.

Relative to more upright hybrids, flat bar road bikes are often lighter and more efficient to pedal, though less so than a drop bar bike by equal measure. Drop bar bikes will have considerable aerodynamic advantages above about 15 MPH. Conventional hybrids will have a measure of off-road capability lacking in entirety from flat bar bikes. For efficient speed with the familiarity and stability of a flat bar, however, the flat bar road bike is an optimal compromise.

== See also ==
- Outline of cycling
