= Hybrid bicycle =

General purpose bicycle

Hybrid bicycles blend characteristics from more specialized road bikes, touring bikes and mountain bikes. The resulting "hybrid" is a general-purpose bike that can tolerate a wide range of riding conditions and applications. Their stability, comfort and ease of use make them popular with novice cyclists, casual riders, commuters, and children.

Hybrids typically borrow the flat, straight handlebars and upright seating posture of a mountain bike, which many bicyclists find comfortable and intuitive. Hybrids also employ the lighter weight, thinner wheels and smooth tires of road bikes, allowing for greater speed and less exertion when riding on the road. Hybrid bikes often have places to mount racks and bags for transporting belongings, much like a touring bike.

Hybrid bikes have spawned numerous sub-categories satisfying diverse ridership. They are classified by their design priorities, such as those optimized for comfort or fitness — and those offered as city, cross or commuter bikes.

== History ==
From the early 20th century until after World War II, the utility roadster constituted most adult bicycles sold in the United Kingdom and in many parts of the British Empire. In Britain, the roadster declined noticeably in popularity during the early 1970s, as a boom in recreational cycling caused manufacturers to concentrate on lightweight 10–14 kg (23–30 lb), affordable derailleur sport bikes, actually slightly-modified versions of the racing bicycle of the era. In the 1980s, U.K. cyclists began to shift from road-only bicycles to all-terrain models such as the mountain bike. The mountain bike's sturdy frame and load-carrying ability gave it additional versatility as a utility bike, usurping the role previously filled by the roadster. By 1990, the roadster was almost dead; while annual U.K. bicycle sales reached an all-time record of 2.8 million, almost all of them were mountain and road/sport models. A different situation, however, was occurring in most Asian countries: roadsters are still widely made and used in countries such as China, India, Thailand, Vietnam and others as well in parts of north-western Europe.

== Trekking bike ==
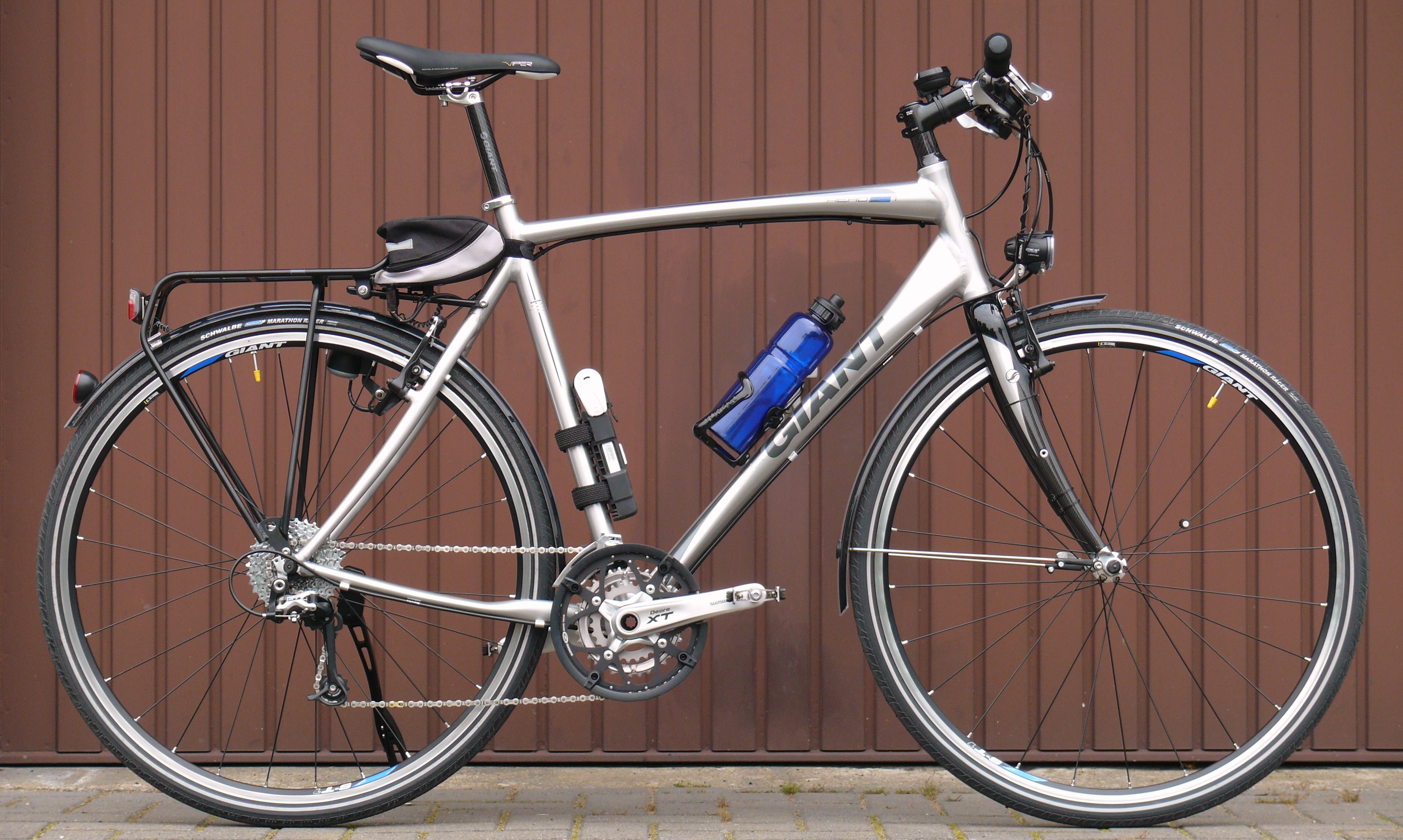
Lightweight trekking bike

A trekking bike is a hybrid with all the accessories necessary for bicycle touring – mudguards, pannier rack, lights etc.

== Cross bike ==
Cross bikes use a road bicycle frame similar to a racing or sport/touring bicycle, and are normally equipped with nearly flat handlebars to provide a more upright riding position than a racing or sport/touring bike. As a hybrid bike intended for general recreational and utility use, the cross bike differs from the cyclo-cross bicycle, which is a racing bicycle purposely designed to compete in the sport of cyclo-cross competition. Cross bikes are fitted with 700c (ISO 622) wheels using somewhat wider semi-treaded tires (28.6–31.8 mm or 1.125–1.25 in) than those fitted to most racing or sport/touring models. The additional tire width and tread is intended to give the cross bike hybrid some ability to deal with rough or littered surfaces that might be encountered on paved or unpaved bike trails, such as gravel, leaves, hard-packed sand, and shallow mud. Most cross bikes are biased towards moderate off-pavement use and light weight, and as such are not normally fitted with fenders, lights, or carrier racks. The larger 700c wheels are a little faster on paved surfaces and can give an advantage for longer trips or for touring purposes.

== Commuter bike ==
The commuter bike is a hybrid designed specifically for commuting over short or long distances. It typically features derailleur gearing, 700c wheels with fairly light 29 mm (1 1/8 in) tires, a carrier rack, full fenders, and a frame with suitable mounting points for attachment of various load-carrying baskets or panniers. It sometimes, though not always, has an enclosed chainguard to allow a rider to pedal the bike in long pants without entangling them in the chain. A well-equipped commuter bike typically features front and rear lights for use in the early morning or late evening hours encountered at the start or end of a business day.

== City bike ==
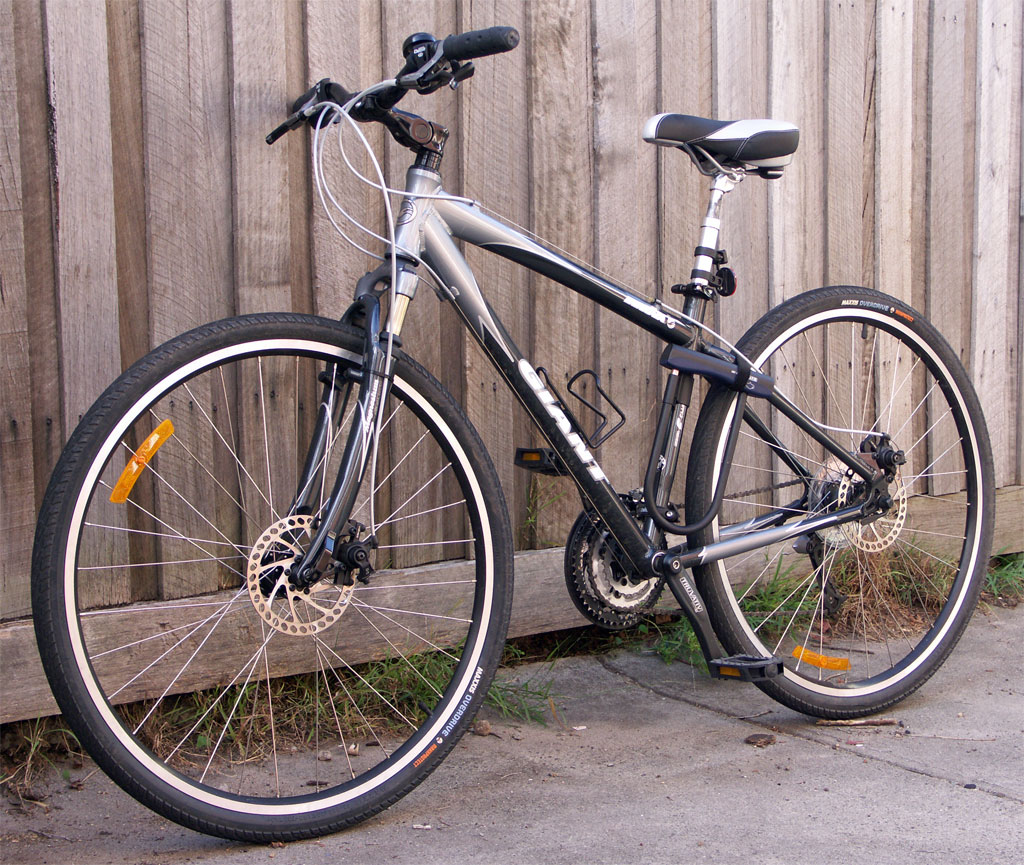
The 2005 Giant Innova is an example of a typical 700c hybrid city bicycle.

Similar to the commuter bike, the city bike is more optimized for urban commuting. Unlike the European city bike, it has mountain bike heritage, gearing, and strong yet lightweight frame construction. They usually feature a longer wheelbase, mountain bike-sized 26-inch (ISO 559) wheels or 700c wheels, a more upright riding position, and tyres approximately 38–50 mm (1.5–1.95 in) wide. These wider tyres allow the use of lower tyre pressure compared with narrower road tyres, which can improve comfort on uneven surfaces and increase grip on unsealed surfaces such as gravel trails. Using a sturdy welded chromoly or aluminium frame derived from mountain bike designs, the city bike is designed to withstand impacts from urban conditions such as potholes and city curb drops. City bikes are designed to have reasonably quick, yet solid and predictable handling, better balance during low speeds, and are normally fitted with full fenders for use in all weather conditions. A few city bikes may have enclosed chainguards, others may have suspension forks, similar to mountain bikes. City bikes may also come with front and rear lighting systems for use at night or in bad weather.

== Comfort bike ==
A Giant brand Sedona comfort bike on the Pinellas Trail in Dunedin, Florida.

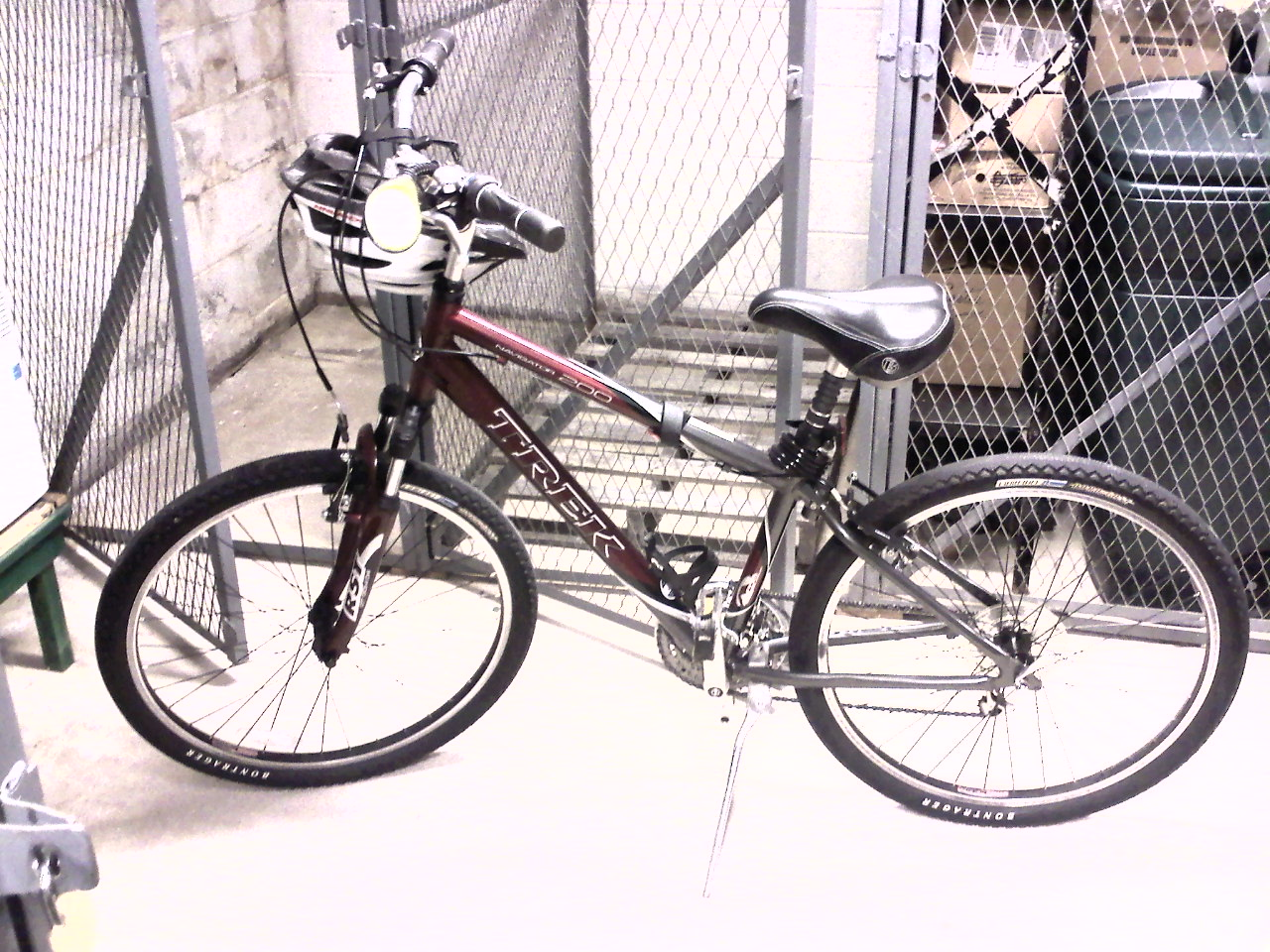
Trek Navigator 200 comfort bike

Another subclass of the hybrid category is the comfort bike. Comfort bikes are essentially modern versions of the old roadster and sports roadster bicycle, though modern comfort bikes are often equipped with derailleur gears rather than hub gears. They typically have a modified mountain bike frame with a tall head tube to provide an upright riding position, 26-inch (ISO 559) or 28-inch (ISO 622) wheels, and 44-or-50 mm (1.75-or-1.95 in) "middleweight" smooth or semi-slick tires. Comfort bikes typically incorporate such features as front suspension forks, seat post suspension with wide plush saddles, and drop-center, angled North Road-style handlebars designed for easy reach while riding in an upright position.

== See also ==
- Gravel bike, a hybrid between road bike and mountain bike designed for gravel use, and with drop bars
- Outline of cycling
