= List of bicycle part manufacturing companies =

This article lists bicycle part manufacturers and brands past and present. For a list of bicycle manufacturers, see list of bicycle manufacturers.

== 0-9 ==
- 3T Cycling - Italy

== A ==
- absoluteBLACK - UK
- Acros - Germany
- Atala (company) - Italy
- Avid - USA (SRAM Corporation)

== B ==
- Baisikeli Ugunduzi - Kenya
- Bell Sports Inc. - USA
- Bike Arc - USA
- Bontrager - USA
- Bosch eBike Systems - Germany
- Brooks Saddle - UK
- Burley Design - USA

== C ==
- Cadex - Taiwan
- Campagnolo - Italy
- Challenge Tires - Italy
- Cheng Shin Rubber (also branded as Maxxis and CST)
- Chris King - USA
- Croder Cycling - Taiwan
- Cinelli - Italy
- Coker Tire - USA
- Columbus - Italy
- Continental - Germany
- Cane Creek Cycling Components - USA

== D ==
- Dia-Compe - Japan
- DT Swiss - Swiss

== E ==
- Easton - USA (Fox Factory Holding)
- Enve - USA
- e*thirteen - USA
- Eleek - Ukraine

== F ==
- Fox Racing Shox - USA
- FSA - Taiwan
- Fulcrum Wheels - Italy

== G ==
- Gabaruk - Poland
- Garmin - USA
- Gates Corporation - USA
- Giro - Italy
- Gary Fisher - USA

== H ==
- HED Cycling Products - USA
- Hopetech - UK
- Hutchinson Tires - France

== I ==
- Ingersoll-Rand, manufacturer of Kryptonite locks - USA
- Inoue Rubber Co., Ltd., manufacturer of IRC Tires - Japan

== J ==
- Jagwire - Taiwan

== K ==
- Kenda Rubber Industrial Company - Taiwan
- Kinesis Industry - Taiwan
- KMC Chain - Taiwan

== L ==
- Lezyne - USA
- Lightweight - Germany
- Look - France

== M ==
- Mafac - France
- Magura GmbH - Germany
- Marzocchi - Italy (Fox Factory Holding)
- Mavic - France
- Maxxis - USA
- Meghna Group - Bangladesh
- Miche - France
- Michelin - France

== N ==
- Newmen Components - Germany
- Nitto - Japan
- Nokian Tyres - Finland
- Novatec - Taiwan

== O ==
- OneUp Components - Canada

== P ==
- Panaracer - Japan ( Panasonic Corporation)
- Park Tool - USA
- Paul Components - USA
- Pinion - Germany
- Planet X Limited - UK
- Procons Oy Ab - Finland

== Q ==
- Quality Bicycle Products - USA

== R ==
- Race Face - Canada (Fox Factory Holding)
- Reynolds Technology - UK
- Tom Ritchey - USA
- RockShox - USA (SRAM Corporation)
- Rohloff AG - Germany
- Rotor - Spain

== S ==
- Sachs - Germany (SRAM Corporation)
- Schwalbe - Germany
- Selle Italia - Italy
- Selle Royal - Italy
- Shimano - Japan
- Sislent Components SL - Spain
- Specialized Bicycle Components - USA
- Speedplay - USA (Wahoo)
- SRAM - USA
- Stans NoTubes - USA
- Sturmey Archer - UK
- Sun Race - Taiwan
- SunTour - Japan
- Sugino - Japan
- Surly parts - USA
- Swiss stop - Swiss

== T ==
- Tektro - Taiwan
- Trek Bicycle Corporation - USA
- Truvativ - USA (SRAM Corporation)
- Tube India - India
- Thomson - USA

== U ==
- Ultradynamico - USA
- UVEX - Germany

== V ==
- Vittoria - Italy
- Vredestein - Netherlands

== W ==
- Wahoo Fitness - USA
- Wilderness Trail Bikes - USA
- Wippermann - Germany
- Wolf Tooth Components - USA
- WTB - USA

== X ==
- Xtracycle - USA

== Z ==
- Zipp - USA (SRAM Corporation)
- Zéfal - France

== See also ==
- List of bicycle manufacturers
- Outline of cycling
