= Greg Herbold =

American professional mountain bike racer (born 1962)

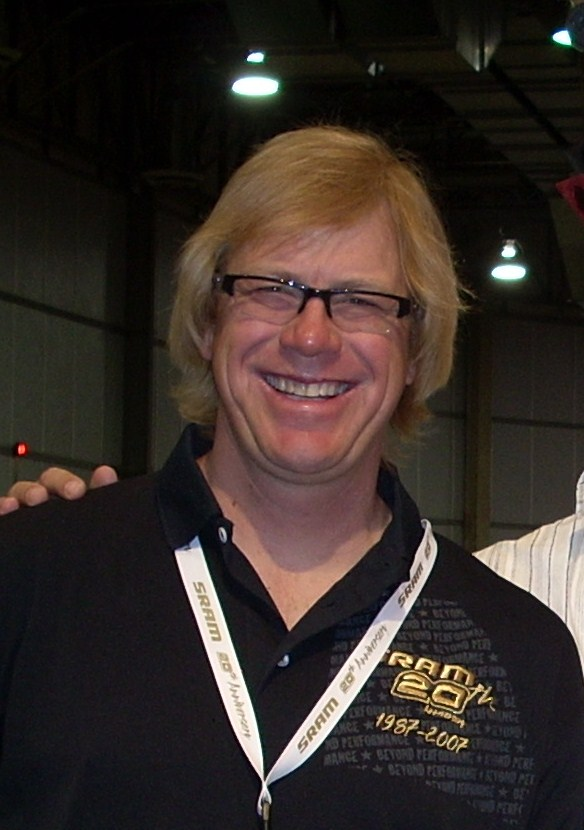
- Herbold at Interbike 2007

Personal information
- Born: December 11, 1962 (age 63) Denver, Colorado, U.S.

Cycling career
- Sport: Cycling
- Discipline: Mountain bike
- Role: Rider
- Rider type: Downhill
Medal record
Men's mountain bike racing
Representing United States
World Championships
Gold medal – first place	1990 Durango	Downhill

Greg "H-Ball" Herbold (Born December 11, 1962) is an American former professional mountain bike racer. He competed in many forms of cycling including cross-country racing and Mountain bike trials but, was most notable for his downhill mountain bike racing career. Herbold was inducted into the Mountain Bike Hall of Fame in 1996.

== Mountain biking career ==
Herbold was born in Denver, Colorado. He won the first dual slalom race at Mammoth Mountain in 1987. A year later, "Over the 1989 Labor Day weekend, September 2–4, around 1,500 mountain bike aficionados united under a blazing sun at Big Bear Lakes, CA, home of the NORBA National Championships... By Monday, the morning of the downhill race, many of the riders had gone, leaving the steep, technical 1,200-foot descent to the daredevils. Greg "Hair-ball" Herbold careened down the chute of deep ruts and shifting dust with hidden rocks to finish first with a time of 2:28... Herbold, on that fine line between finesse and out-of-control, also won the dual slalom event."

Herbold won the Downhill Class at the 1990 UCI Mountain Bike World Championships in Durango, Colorado. He won the NORBA National Downhill Championship in 1988, 1989, and 1993, and the North American Downhill Championship in 1991.

He appears in the videotape "Battle At Durango: First-Ever World Mountain Bike Championships" produced by New & Unique Videos of San Diego and released in 1991.

After retirement from racing, Herbold worked in the cycling industry, at RockShox and later SRAM.
