= Dia-Compe =

Japanese bicycle component manufacturer

KK Yoshigai
- Industry: Bicycle component manufacturer
- Founded: 1930
- Headquarters: Kadoma, Osaka, Japan
- Key people: Kozo Yoshigai (President)
- Products: Brakes, headsets, suspension forks and handlebar stems
- Website: www.diacompe.co.jp

KK Yoshigai (jap. 株式会社ヨシガイ, Kabushiki kaisha Yoshigai), known by its brand name Dia-Compe, is a Japanese manufacturer of bicycle components headquartered in Kadoma of the Ōsaka Prefecture. Dia-Compe have specialised in caliper and cantilever brakes, headsets, handlebar stems, suspension forks and other bicycle components.

== History ==
The company manufactured its first bicycle brake in 1930. In 1949, the company was floated on the Tokyo Stock Exchange. Kiyokazu and Toshiharu Yoshigai, the sons of the company's founder, later succeeded their father at the company's helm. Kiyokazu Yoshigai's son, Kozo Yoshigai, is now president of the company.

In the 1960s the Swiss manufacturer Weinmann supplied Dia-Compe with brake parts. Dia-Compe invented the brake-lever extension in roughly 1969. This was at once widely appreciated by manufacturers including Schwinn, which dropped the use of Weinmann brake sets and adopted Dia Compe brake sets on all models except the Schwinn Paramount. However, this invention was also nicknamed as "Suicide Levers" because they did not fully actuate the brake levers, producing a loss of stopping power. Their patents were so intimidating that Weinmann cross-licensed all Dia-Compe patents in return for access to the brake-lever extension patent a few years later. International subsidiaries of the Dia-Compe brand were established in the United States in 1975 and in the Republic of China (Taiwan) in 1987.

In 1990 John Rader, the designer of the Aheadset system (US Patent 5095770 A), gave exclusive licensing to Dia-Compe for the product. Dia-Compe USA financed fledgling company RockShox in the development of the RS-1 suspension fork. The USA subsidiary of Dia-Compe was eventually purchased by RockShox in the 1990s. In 1992 Dia-Compe USA became Cane Creek Cycling Components and introduced the threadless headset.

Dia-Compe has begun selling a range of other wheel components. Other KK Yoshigai brand names for wheel components are Diatech and Gran Compe. A subsidiary of the Diatech brand was founded in 1996 in the United States. The company also produces complete bicycles.

In 2005, the company moved its headquarters to Kadoma.
