= RockShox =

American company that manufactures bicycle suspensions

RockShox Inc.
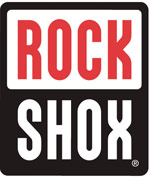
- Industry: Bicycle Component Manufacturer
- Founded: 1989; 37 years ago
- Founder: Paul Turner
- Headquarters: Colorado Springs, Colorado, United States
- Products: Suspension forks, rear shocks
- Parent: SRAM Corporation
- Website: www.rockshox.com

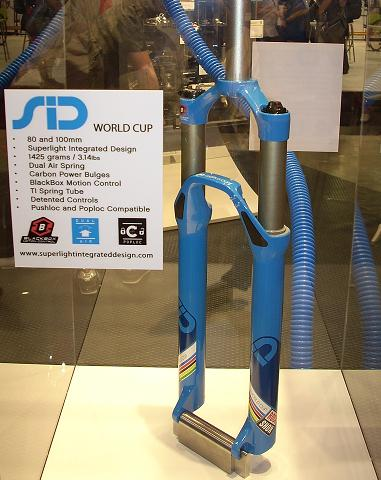
2008 RockShox SID World Cup suspension fork for mountain bikes.

RockShox Inc. is an American company founded by Paul Turner in 1989, that develops and manufactures bicycle suspensions. The company led in the development of mountain bikes. It is now part of SRAM Corporation.

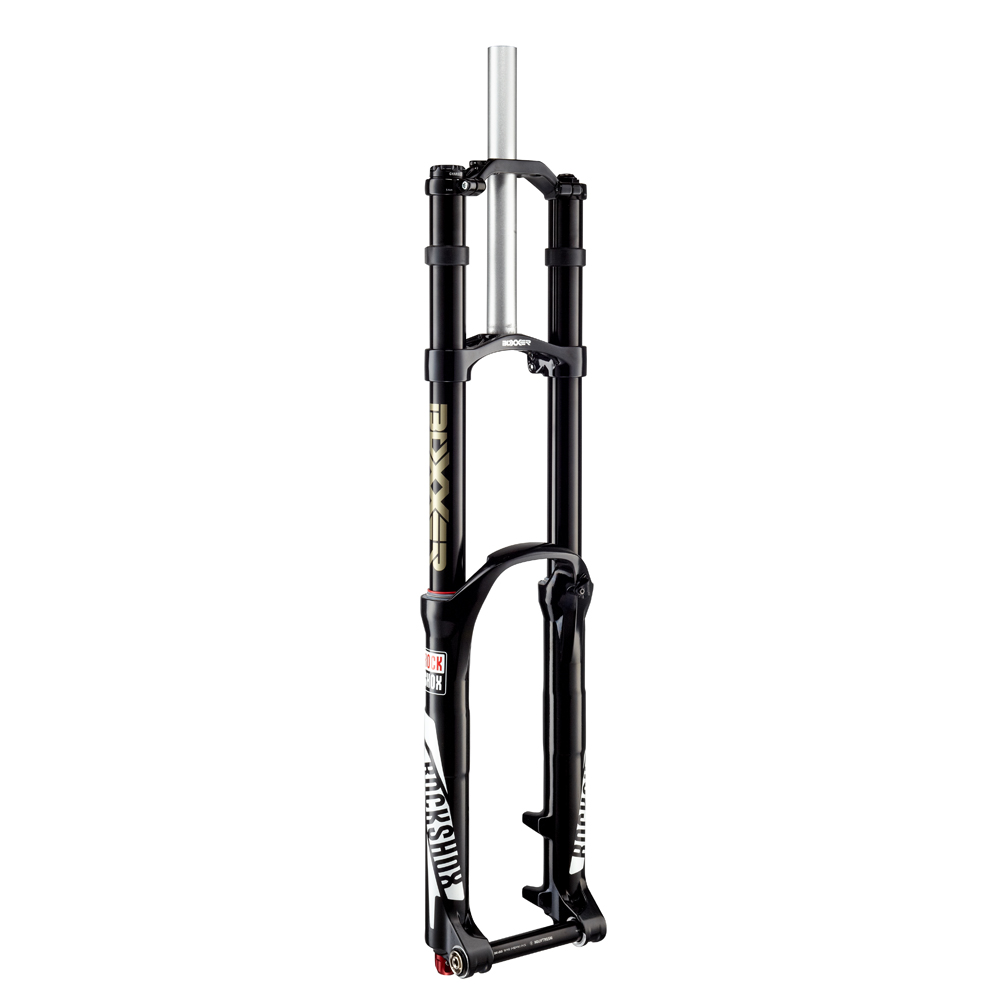

== History ==
=== Start ===
RockShox was founded by Paul Turner in 1989 in Asheville, North Carolina, USA. It moved to California four years later when Steve and Deborah Simons bought out Dia Compe.

Turner raced motorcycles in his teens. In 1977, at the age of 18, he established a company that sold motorcycle components. He later worked for the Honda Motor Company as factory mechanic for their professional motocross team. This put him in contact with designers of suspension systems for motorcycles and other motocross industry people.

Simons was a former motocross rider in his teens and early twenties and entrepreneur. He developed heat sinks for Koni shock absorbers to lower oil temperatures and then in 1974 he worked with Geoff Fox to design a shock absorber Fox Shox for Moto-X Fox Inc. He then established his own company Dynamic Enterprises which became Simons Inc. developing pneumatic upgrade kits for suspension forks. This led to his own fork design and manufacture. He had two patents on suspension forks, one which, for upside down forks, he licensed to motorcycle and suspension manufacturers.

In the late 1980s Paul began riding mountain bikes and with his motorcycle experience longed for suspension. Paul began developing the first bicycle suspension fork. In 1989 or 1990, Turner approached Simons for help designing a suspension fork for mountain bikes. Turner had in 1987, with the help of Keith Bontrager, presented a full bike with front and rear suspension at the bicycle industry trade show in Long Beach. The industry was not impressed. Two years later Turner and his wife Christi were manufacturing suspension forks in their garage with parts bought from Simons Inc, who later partnered Turner when Steve and his wife, Deborah, mortgaged their home to buy out Dia-Compe and move manufacturing to Mt. View, California in 1993. The R&D and Marketing groups remained in Boulder, Co. until moving to Mt. View, Ca in 1994 and then Santa Cruz in 1995. Manufacturing and Engineering move to San Jose, Ca in 1995. They worked with Thomas Dooley at TDA in Boulder, CO who created the current RockShox logo, and was the creative director for all marketing and advertising.

Turner brought in Greg Herbold as a test rider and company spokesman. In 1990 Herbold became the first world champion in downhill mountain biking riding one of the first suspension forks for mountain bikes made. In August that year the company manufactured its first 100 suspension forks, the RS-1. The start-up was financed by the East Asian bike component manufacturer Dia-Compe, the founders, and other investors. Dia-Compe manufactured the next series of forks in addition to the original Aheadset, which the RS-1 utilised. Later Dia-Compe USA was bought out by Simons & Turner who disposed of its shares. From then the forks were primarily manufactured at RockShox in Mt.View, Ca.

In 1992 Turner & Simons, using the RockShox RS-1 design, created a private label fork for Specialized working with Mark Winter. Mark left Specialized a few years later, joining RockShox in 1995.

=== Growth and IPO ===
Eight years after inception the company manufactured and sold a million RockShox forks and had revenues of $100 million. The company went public in October 1996, was listed on the Nasdaq Stock Exchange (ticker: RSHX), and raised 65 million dollars ($72 million before deduction of IPO related costs). The company had 300 employees, most in the company's US factories. RockShox had a market share of 60 percent.

=== Competition and cost savings ===
Towards the end of the 1990s competition was fierce and profits were thin.

Rock Shox was one of many brands that marketed suspension forks for bicycles, others were Answer Manitou, Marzocchi and RST. During this time Fox Racing Shox also entered the bicycle industry. As the number of direct substitutes to Rock Shox's products increased, the company experienced difficulties in protecting its position as the leading manufacturer in the business.

In June 2000 RockShox moved production to Colorado Springs, which saved an estimated $5 million a year. In 2001 the company lost $10 million.

=== SRAM takeover ===
In 2002 RockShox defaulted on a loan to SRAM. SRAM took over the company and its debt obligations for $5.6 million. The company had 300 employees in Colorado Springs. In 2002, production in Colorado moved to Taichung, Taiwan. A small test facility remains in Colorado Springs.

Paul Turner has been nominated for the Mountain Bike Hall of Fame several times but declined.

== Product chronology and common specifications ==
Suspension Forks

Product	Year introduced	Year discontinued	Stanchion Diameter	Travel Lengths	Spring Types
RS-1	1990	1991	25.4 mm		Air, oil return
Mag 20	1992	1992	25.4 mm	48 mm	Air, oil return
Mag 30	1992	1992	25.4 mm	48 mm	Air, oil return
Mag 21	1993	1997	25.4 mm	48 mm (60 mm long travel)	Air, oil return
Mag 10	1993	1995	25.4 mm	48 mm	Air, oil return
Mag 21 SL	1994	1994	25.4 mm	48 mm (60 mm long travel)	Air, oil return
Quadra	1993	1995	25.4 mm		Elastomer
Quadra 5	1994	1996	25.4 mm	48 mm	Elastomer
Quadra 10 (Primarily OEM)	1994	1995	25.4 mm	48 mm	One-piece Elastomer, Allen wrench adjustable preload on both legs
Quadra 21 (Primarily OEM)	1994/1995	1996	25.4 mm	48 mm	One-piece Elastomer, Hand-adjustable preload on both legs
Quadra 21 R	1994	1996	25.4 mm	60 mm	Elastomer, Multi-cell
Judy C/XC	1995	2001	28 mm	50/63/80mm	MCU spring (elastomer), cartridge oil return. Later coil spring open bath oil return
Judy SL	1995	2001	28 mm	50/63/80mm	MCU spring (elastomer), oil return. Later coil spring, open bath oil return
Judy DH	1995	1998	28 mm	80 mm	Coil, MCU spring (elastomer), oil return
Indy C, XC, SL	1997	1998	28.6mm	63mm	MCU spring (elastomer)
Indy S	1998	1999	28.6mm	48mm	Solid elastomer (identical to Quadra 5)
SID	1998	2008	28 mm	63/80 mm (early)	Dual Air until 2013
SID	2008	2020	32 mm	80/100 mm, or 120 mm	Dual Air until 2013, then Solo Air.
SID	2021	present	35 mm	100+ mm	Solo Air.
Judy DHO	1997	1998	28 mm	100 mm	MCU spring (elastomer)
BoXXer	1998	Present	32 mm (1998–2009), 35 mm (2010–present)	150 mm (early), 180 mm, 200 mm (present)	Coil (World cup model with solo air), Coil U-Turn (Boxxer Ride)
Jett	1999	2001			
Ruby (road/700c)	2000	2000			
Metro (road/700c)	2001	2005			
Psylo	2001	2005	30 mm	80-125mm	Coil U-Turn, Fixed Coil, Hydra-Air, Dual-Air
Duke	2002	2005	30 mm	80/100 mm (Hydra Air) 63-108 (Coil U-Turn)	Hydra-Air (Solo-Air with a coil negative spring), Coil U-Turn 63/108mm
Pike	2004	Present	35 mm (2005-2011 was 32 mm)	140/150/160 mm	Older models were coil or air with or without U-Turn. 2014 onwards are Solo-Air, Dual Position Air, or Debonair.
Pilot	2003	2005	28 mm	80/100 mm	
Reba	2005	Present	32 mm	80/100/120 mm Dual Air, 90–120 mm Air U-Turn, 130/140 mm Trail Specific 29"	Dual Air, Air U-Turn, Trail Specific 29", Solo Air (since 2013)
Recon	2006	Present	32 mm	140 mm (some models like the 335), 80/100/120 mm, 80/100 29"	Solo Air / Coil / Coil U-Turn
Revelation	2006	Present	35 mm (2006-2017 was 32 mm)	130/140/150 mm Dual Air, 120–150 mm Dual Position Air	Dual Air, Dual Position Air, Air U-Turn
Argyle	2007	Present	32 mm	80/100 mm	Coil
Dart	2006	2012	28 mm	80, 100 and 120 mm, 80/100mm 29er model	Coil
Domain	2007	Present	35 mm	160 mm, 180 mm (Single Crown) and 200 mm (Dual Crown)	Coil
Lyrik	2007	Present	35 mm	115 to 160 mm 2-Step and Coil U-Turn, 160/170 mm T/A Solo Air and Coil	2-Step Air, Coil U-Turn, Solo Air and Coil, (newone) Debon air, dual position air
Tora	2006	2012	32 mm	80/100/120 mm, 80/100 mm 29" Coil; 80–140 mm Coil U-Turn and Solo Air	Coil, Coil U-Turn and Solo Air
Totem	2007	2014	40 mm	180 mm	2-Step, Solo Air or Coil
Sektor	2011	Present	32 mm	Up to 150 mm	Coil U-Turn and Solo Air
Bluto (fatbike)	2014	Present	32 mm	100 mm or 120 mm	Solo Air
RS1 (inverted)	2014	Present	32 mm	80 mm,100 mm or 120 mm	Solo Air
Yari	2015	Present	35 mm	110 to 180mm	Solo Air, Dual Air (OEM), debon air (new), dual position air (new)
Zeb	2021	Present	38 mm		dual position air, debon air
30		Present	30		solo air
35		Present	35		debon air
Paragon		Present			
Judy	2017	present	30		Coil, solo air
XC		present	28, 30, 32mm		Coil, solo air

Other features:

There are usually several versions of each product, typically distinguished by the presence or absence of certain features, such as material type, preload, rebound damping, compression damping, lockout, remote lockout and replaceable bushings. This article does not attempt to list all specifications for all versions.
