= Procons =

Finnish sheet metal product manufacturer

Procons Oy Ab
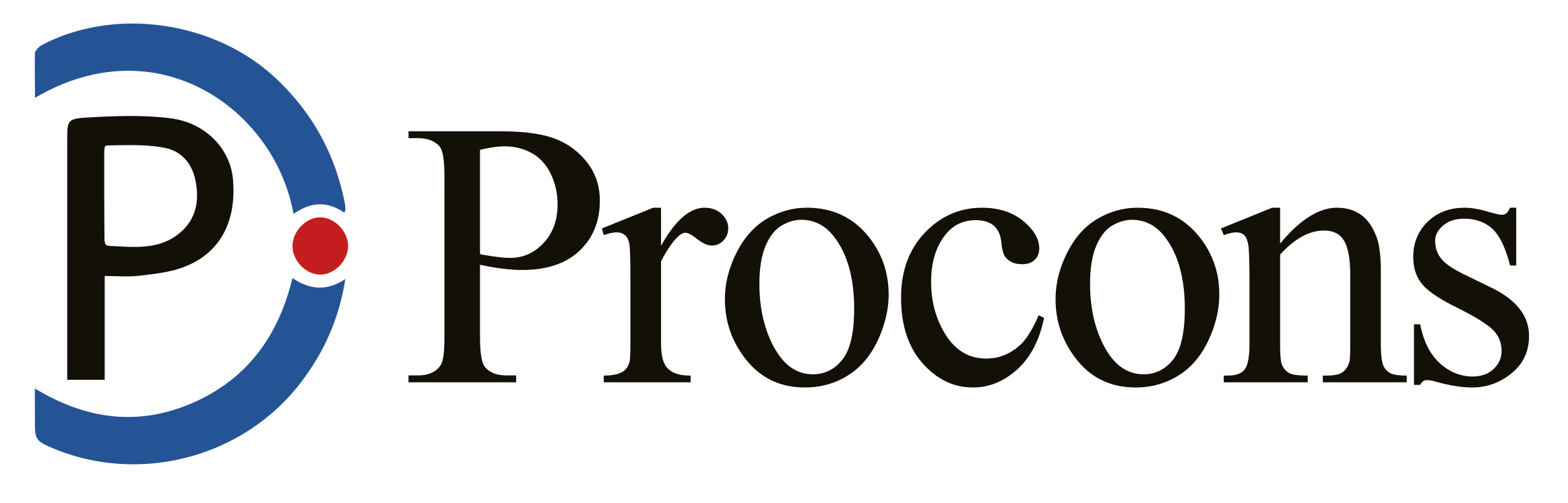
- Formerly: Waasan Vanne
- Company type: Private
- Founded: 1934; 92 years ago
- Headquarters: Malax, Finland
- Key people: West Johnny Klas-Erik (CEO)
- Revenue: ▲€3,068,000 (2020)
- Net income: ▲€222,000 (2020)
- Owner: Leif Sandqvist (from 2002)
- Website: procons.fi

Procons Oy Ab is a Finnish company specialized in sheet metal roll forming and subcontracting. Main business areas include sliding door profiles, bike mudguards and stays, profiles for the electrical and mining industries as well as sheet metal products. The company was founded in 1934 and is located in Malax, Finland.

== History ==
The company that would become Procons Oy Ab was Waasan Vanne, founded in 1934 in Vikby, Finland. It developed and manufactured bicycle mudguards, luggage carriers and rims. In the 1990s, the company shifted its focus to the production of metal profiled products and built automated profiling production lines for thin sheet metal. In 2002, Leif Sandqvist, a former regional executive at Bosch, bought Waasan Vanne. He relocated the company to nearby Malax, his hometown, the next year and, in 2011, reincorporated it as Procons Oy Ab.

== Products ==
=== Bicycle parts ===
Procons is one of Europe's largest manufacturers of bicycle fenders and stays with a production of about 750,000 fenders per year. The product range consists of various models and brands that are produced mainly from 0.5 mm sheet metal in a fully automated line.

=== Other ===
The company acts as a subcontractor providing roll-form manufacturing of various profiles for heavy industry clients. It also develops and manufactures components for the assembly of sliding doors. Other business areas include eccentric pressing, welding, and assembly.
