= Bike Arc =

Coordinates: 37.4433°N 122.1634°W

Bike Arc LLC, located in downtown Palo Alto, California, is a Silicon Valley startup that designs secure bicycle parking racks and systems. It was founded by Joseph Bellomo and Jeff Selzer in 2008. Jeff Selzer sits on the board of directors of the Silicon Valley Bicycle Coalition and is the General Manager of Palo Alto Bicycles. Joseph Bellomo, a California-licensed architect, is the founder and owner of Joseph Bellomo Architects, Inc. in Palo Alto, which he founded in 1986. In addition to collaborating on Bike Arc, Mr. Bellomo and Mr. Selzer also worked together on the Palo Alto Bikestation at the Caltrain depot.

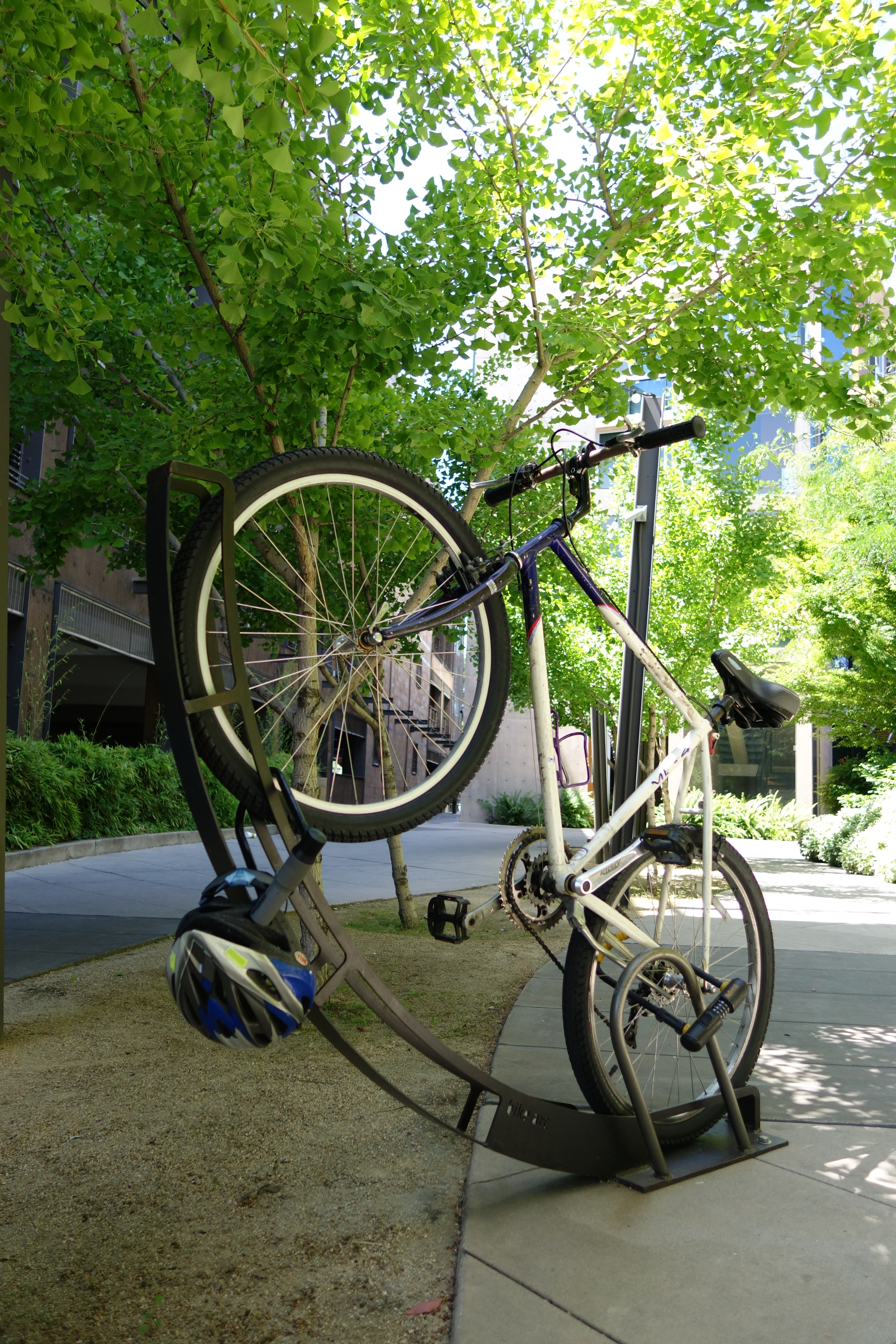
Rac Arc by Bike Arc in downtown Palo Alto, California

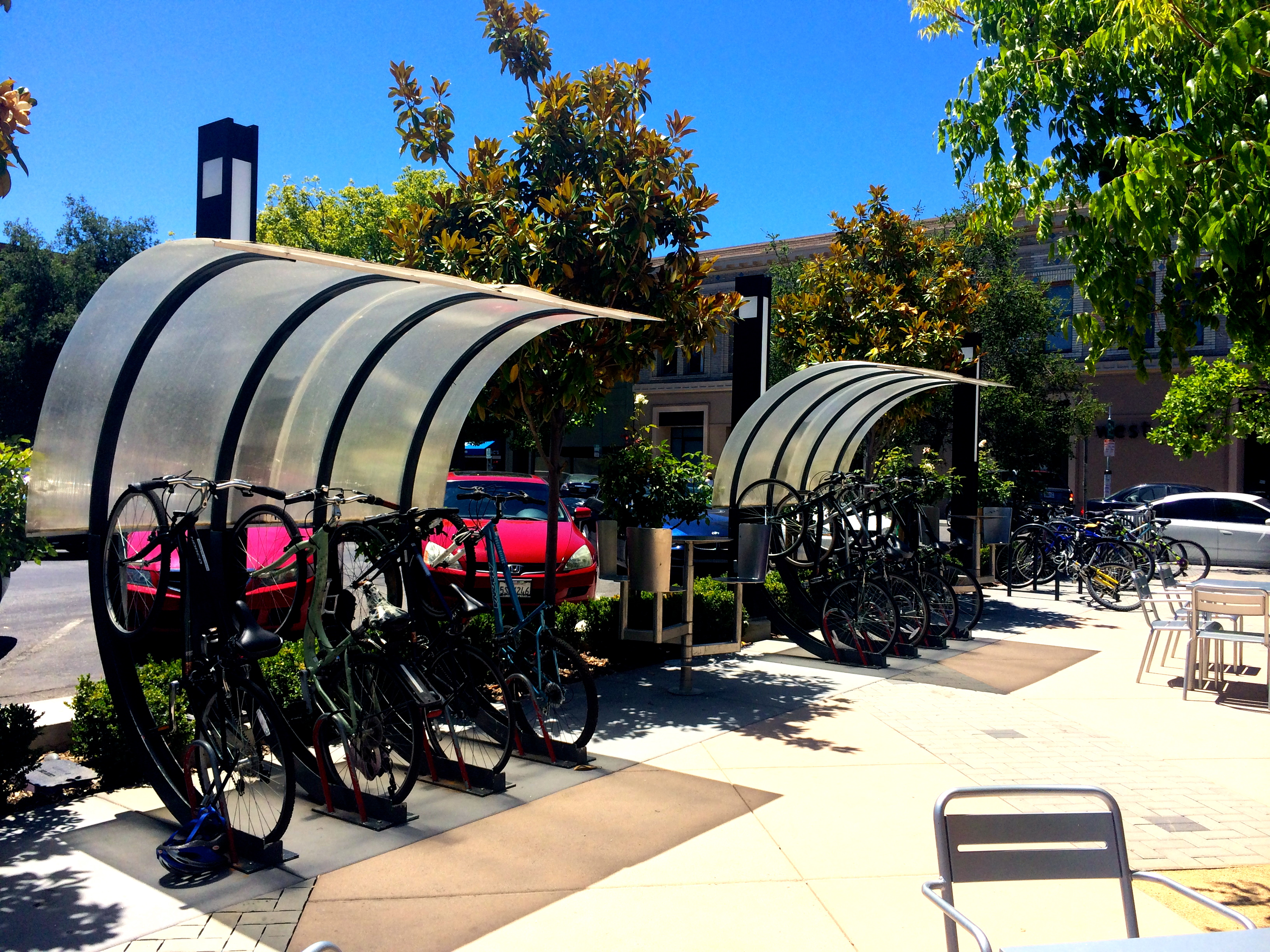
Half Arc by Bike Arc in Lytton Plaza (downtown Palo Alto, Ca.). Bicycle parking/bike rack/bike storage.

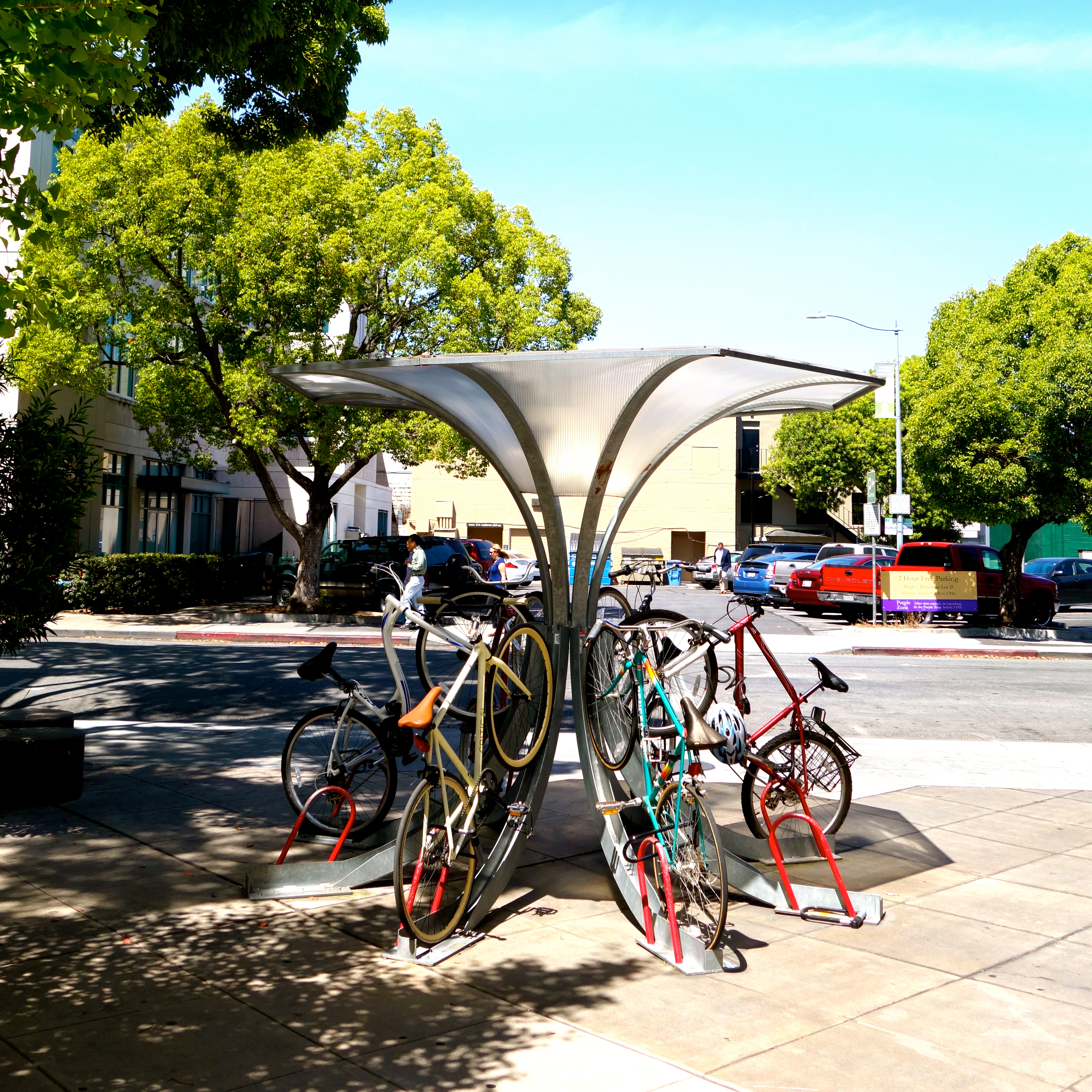
Umbrella Arc bicycle parking system/bike racks/bicycle storage by Bike Arc.

In 2009, the American Institute of Architects, California Council, gave Bike Arc the Honor Award for Small Projects.

== Philosophy ==
Mr. Bellomo and Mr. Selzer—both being bicycle enthusiasts—set out to design bicycle-parking systems that don't touch and potentially damage bicycles, a solution that prevents bicycles from contacting each other, which can cause wear-and-tear.

== Products ==
Bike Arc is patented in both the United States and in Europe (Office for Harmonization in the Internal Market), and the company offers multiple iterations of the same fundamental concept: a modular structure of steel arcs. The Bike Arc family includes the Rack Arc, the Half Arc, the Umbrella Arc, the Tube Arc, the Car Arc, the Bus Arc, the House Arc, and the Ad Arc.

All Bike Arc products are manufactured in the United States.

== Installations ==
The City of Palo Alto has purchased and installed multiple Bike Arc products, including numerous Rack Arcs, Half Arcs and Umbrella Arcs, and Bike Arcs are also in public spaces in Boston, Las Vegas, Redwood City, California, and Norfolk, Virginia. They have also been installed at the University of Buffalo and the University of Nebraska, as well as—among others—at Juniper Networks, Inc., Varian Medical Systems, Inc., and the Seattle Repertory Theater.

== See also ==
- Bicycle locker
- Bicycle parking
- Bicycle
- Cycling
- Sustainable design
- Sustainable architecture
- Urban planning
- City planning
