= Inoue Rubber =

Japanese maker of tires and rubber products

Inoue Rubber Co., Ltd.
- Industry: Tyre
- Founded: Japan, 1926; 100 years ago
- Products: Tyres for bicycles, motorcycles, and wheelchairs
- Parent: Inoac
- Website: www.irc-tire.com

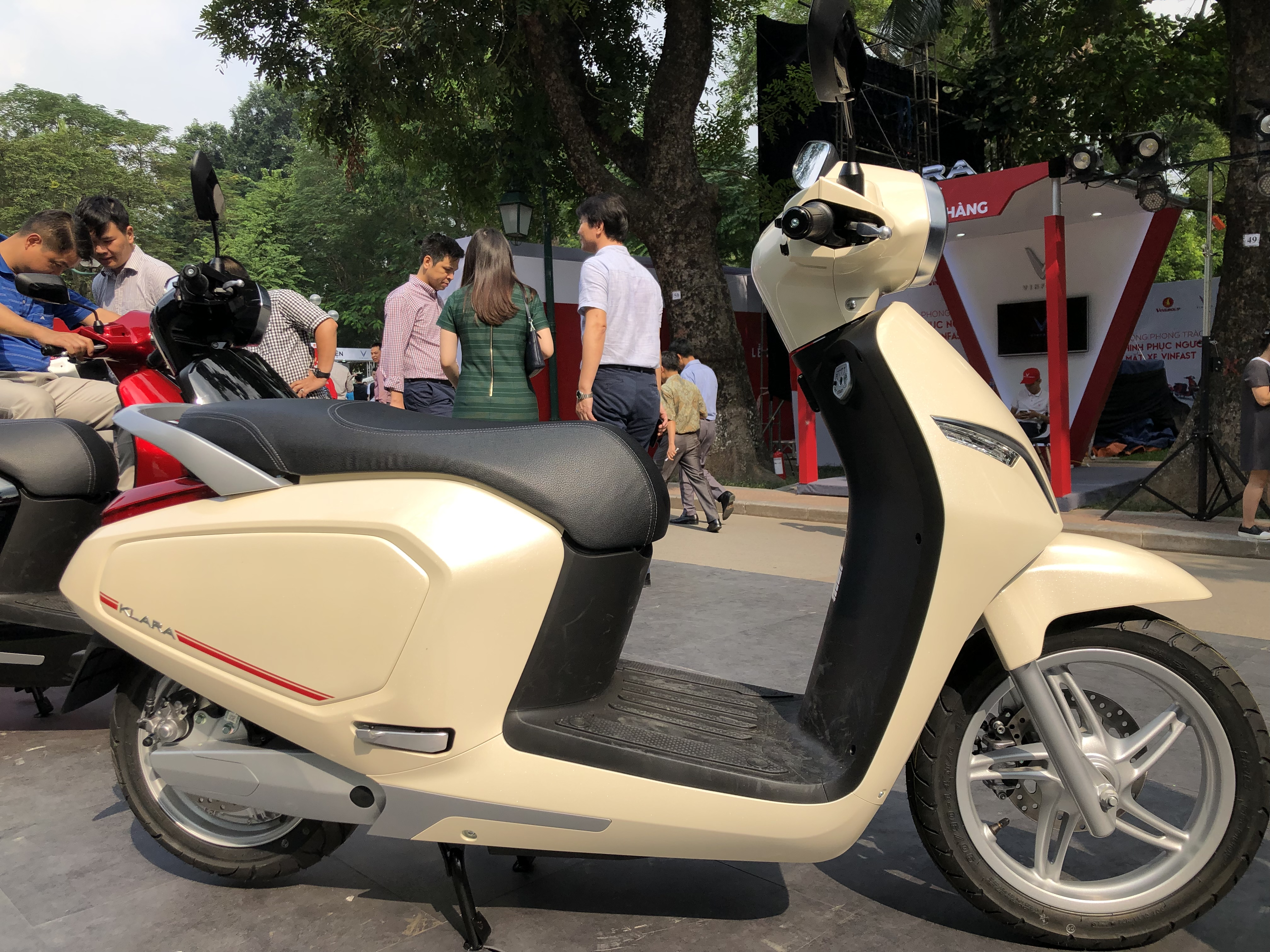
IRC tire for VinFast Klara electric scooter 2018

Inoue Rubber Co., Ltd. is a Japanese maker of tires for bicycles, motorcycles, and wheelchairs and other rubber products. They market tires under the IRC Tire brand name and have manufacturing facilities in Japan, China, Vietnam, Thailand, Malaysia, and Indonesia. They were founded in 1926 in Nagoya, Japan by Mr. Inoue to manufacture bicycle tires and tubes and started manufacturing motorcycle tires in 1952.

Inoue Rubber also manufactured tires for Avocet, a US "company that designs and markets parts and accessories for bicycles."
