= Zipp =

American cycling components company

Zipp Speed Weaponry
- Company type: Private
- Industry: cycling components
- Founded: 1988; 38 years ago
- Headquarters: Indianapolis, Indiana
- Products: Bicycle and related components
- Website: zipp.com

Zipp is an American company that is best known for designing, manufacturing, and marketing carbon-composite bicycle wheels for road cycling, triathlons, track racing, and mountain biking. The company's product range also includes handlebars, stems, seat posts, tires, inner tubes, handlebar tape, and bags.

== History ==
In 1988, the company was founded by motorsports engineer Leigh Sargent and released its first carbon fiber disc wheel. Zipp was acquired by bicycle component manufacturer SRAM in November 2007. In October 2010, Zipp relocated from its original design and manufacturing facility in Speedway, Indiana to an expanded site in Indianapolis.

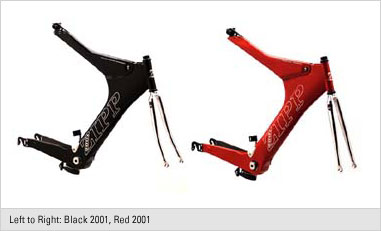
Zipp Frames in red and black

Zipp sells spoked wheels, disc wheels, and other products (including stems, seat posts, handlebars, handlebar tape, tires, tubes, and bags) through an international list of authorized dealers. In the early 1990s, Zipp built and sold the Zipp 2001, a radical "beam" bike, which has subsequently been discontinued. Zipp also produced mountain bike wheels at its inception, but dropped the program later in favor of a more specialized road line.

The company was first to market with dimpled discs and rims (they also own the patent), to induce boundary layer turbulence and prevent detached airflow in crosswinds. Zipp has done pioneering research in aerodynamics, using various high tech wind tunnels, and has published advanced papers in this area. The company was also the first to produce disc wheels, deep section rims, and cranksets using carbon fiber technology.

=== Wheels ===
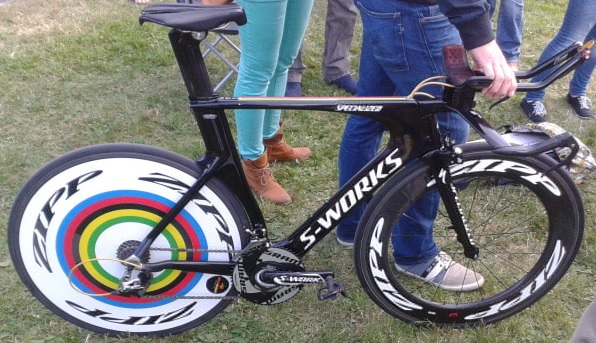
2014 time trial bike of world champion Ellen van Dijk with a rainbow disk wheel as the world champion.

In 2005, Zipp debuted the first all aluminum clincher from the company: the Team CSC Clincher. The wheel was intended for use as a training wheelset. Zipp introduced an extra deep aero wheel the 808 (82mm), launched the 606 (404F + 808R) and their 999 wheelset (808F + 900 disc).

Zipp has introduced the "customized" ZEDTECH wheel line in 2007. Users can choose from an array of colors for decals, spoke nipples, and hub end caps. All ZEDTECH wheels now include aerodynamic dimpled hubs with ceramic bearings. Also in 2007, a new 808 track wheel was introduced with 20/24-spoke pattern and the 343 wheel set (303F + 404R).

New products announced for 2008 included: the redesigned 202, a lightweight (1070 g) climbing racing wheel featuring a revamped, deeper section rim, the world's deepest conventional, non-disc TT and tri wheel (108mm) named simply the '1080' and the Sub9 bulge disc—a flat disc with a lenticular bulge for the last few inches of rim depth—that recorded the first ever true negative drag in the wind tunnel. At a 15 degree yaw angle, when normalized to 25 mph, the Sub9 with Zipp's Tangente tire showed a reduction in drag equivalent to 11W of forward thrust; roughly equivalent to a mile an hour advantage.

For 2009, Zipp introduced a new 88/188 hub series with adjustable pre-load, seals, wider axle and higher flanges, redesigned the 404 and 808 all-carbon rims, giving them toroidal braking surfaces.

Zipp's 2010 product line featured two new wheel models. The Super-9 is a flat-sided, 27.5mm disc that Zipp claims matches the Sub-9's ability to generate forward lift, but avoids the interference issues that have occurred with the Sub-9's bulged section on bikes with very narrow chainstays. The new 101 wheelset featured the first aluminum clincher rim with a fully toroidal profile and reaches a lower price point than Zipp's carbon wheels. 2010 also saw a redesign of the 303 wheelset with claimed improvements to strength, durability, and aerodynamics.

Currently, the most popular wheel made by Zipp is the 404 Firecrest clincher wheelset, known for its lightweight dimpled 58mm deep rim. The appeal of the 404 stems from its aerodynamics and a low rim weight (resulting in a low moment of inertia) which make it a versatile wheel for flat and hilly terrain.

In 2011 Zipp released a new line of its long-awaited carbon clincher wheelsets. The 303, 404, and 808 Firecrest carbon clinchers were designed to provide decreased aerodynamic drag and increased stability in crosswinds as well as improved braking performance on long descents. The revolutionary Firecrest rim shape, with its wide profile and flat, U-shaped spoke bed, was quickly copied throughout the industry. The same year Zipp also discontinued its 404 and 808 aluminum/carbon hybrid clinchers and retooled its Indianapolis factory to produce only carbon wheels.

In 2012 the 303 Firecrest tubular and 303 Firecrest carbon clincher were launched. Zipp's MAX and CX wheel sets were discontinued the same year.

2013 saw the launch of the Super-9 disc clincher rear wheel and the 303 Firecrest disc brake wheelset. The latter was available in both a tubular and clincher version and utilized a 24-spoke version of the company's 88/188 hubset. Also in 2013, the Zipp 101 wheelset was discontinued and replaced by the Zipp 30 wheelset and the 202 Firecrest carbon clincher wheelset was introduced.

In 2014 Zipp launched its 404 Firestrike wheelset. The new wheelset offered a claimed increase in crosswind stability on the order of 34%. 404 Firestrike wheels also offered a revised brake track for improved braking in all weather conditions. Echoing the product's name, four hundred and four of the limited edition wheelsets were produced. A disc brake version of the 202 was also released in 2014 utilizing the same 88/188 hubset as the 303 disc brake wheelset launched the previous year.

In 2015 Zipp launched a number of new wheelsets including a revised 202 and 303 Firecrest disc brake wheelset utilizing the company's new 77/177 hubset. A rim brake version of the same hubset was used across the board for the rest of Zipp's road dedicated Firecrest wheel line.

Also in 2015 Zipp released an alloy rimmed, tubeless ready wheelset called Zipp 30 Course. The 30 Course was offered in both a disc brake and rim brake version utilizing the same 77/177 hubset found on the company's Firecrest wheelsets. At Ironman® World Championships in Kona, Hawaii, the same year, Zipp launched its new NSW line of wheels with its first offering, the 808 NSW.

== Wheel technologies ==
In the summer of 2010, Zipp introduced two major new technologies: the company's first full-carbon clincher rims and the Firecrest aero rim shape.

Zipp carbon clinchers were described by one major retailer as “the most long-awaited wheelset release ever”. During the lengthy design and testing process, Zipp employed several new testing methods. These include a system for wind-tunnel testing prototype shapes with fully inflated clincher tires, and the use of thermal imaging to analyze braking performance. Zipp also developed a heat-resistant composite resin to reduce rim temperature during heavy braking.

Firecrest technology was developed from Zipp's earlier “toroidal” rim shapes. These were designed with a bulge in the rim cross-section to reduce turbulence behind the tire at the leading edge of the wheel. Firecrest essentially inverts this shape, placing the leading edge of the airfoil along the interior of the rim (towards the hub). As a result, Zipp claims that Firecrest rims show improved aerodynamic performance at all points around the wheel, combined with improved stability in crosswinds. A product review on the Cyclingnews website reported, “[the] Firecrest aero profile is noticeably fast at cruising speed” and that a Firecrest wheelset “[offers] handling stability in crosswinds unmatched by other aero wheels we've used.”

Zipp NSW wheels feature the company's most advanced technologies and is short for "Nest Speed Weaponry" a reference to the company's advanced R&D office known as "The Nest". For example, the 82mm deep Zipp 808 NSW offers a claimed improvement in crosswind stability and a revised brake track for reduced stopping distances and improved all weather performance compared to Zipp's 808 Firecrest wheels. NSW wheels also featured the company's new “Cognition” hubset. The rear Cognition hub features what Zipp terms an “axial clutch” to disengage the ratcheting mechanism inside the freehub when coasting in order to reduce internal hub drag.

== Other products ==
In addition to wheels, the Zipp product range currently includes handlebars, stems, seatposts, tires, and bags.

Zipp offers aero handlebars for triathlons and time trials, as well as traditional drop handlebars for road cycling. The company produces both carbon fiber and aluminum variants of each.

Zipp currently offers four carbon drop bars. The SL is designed for minimal weight, the SLC2 for stiffness, the Contour SL for comfort, and the SL70 for aerodynamic performance. The company also offers one carbon fiber stem, the SL Sprint.

Beginning in the fall of 2010, Zipp released its first-ever aluminum components. Drop bars, stems, and seatposts are available in two versions: Service Course and the lighter Service Course SL. The Cannondale prepared by Cyclocrossworld.com team has used Service Course SL components from 2010 through 2016.

Additional Zipp components include aerobars such as the VukaAero and VukaClip, and Tangente line of tires. Zipp also offers a small clothing line produced by Castelli.
