= SRAM Corporation =

American bicycle component manufacturer

SRAM, Corp.
- Type: Private
- Industry: Cycling components
- Founded: 1987; 39 years ago
- Headquarters: Chicago, Illinois, U.S.
- Key people: Ken Lousberg (CEO)
- Products: Bicycle and related components
- Revenue: ~US$1.0 billion (2020)
- Number of employees: 3,500
- Website: www.sram.com

SRAM LLC is a privately owned bicycle component manufacturer based in Chicago, Illinois, United States, founded in 1987. SRAM is an acronym comprising the names of its founders. The company produces a range of cycling components, including Grip Shift, and separate gravel, road, and mountain drivetrains from 7 to 13 speed. SRAM developed the Eagle line of mountain bike specific drivetrain components intended to improve shifting performance. SRAM was also the first to release a dedicated "one by" drivetrain with a single front chainring for road bikes.

The company grew to become a cycling component brand, selling under the brands SRAM, Avid, RockShox, Truvativ, Quarq, Zipp, TIME Sport pedals, Hammerhead cycling computers, and Velocio cycling apparel. Their components are manufactured primarily in-house, in factories located in the U.S., Portugal, China and Taiwan, and are distributed and sold as original equipment manufacturer (OEM) equipment and aftermarket components.

== History ==
In their early years, SRAM introduced the Grip Shift (or twist shift) gear-change technology to the road bike market in 1988. Twist shift gear changing was later brought to mountain bikes in 1991.

In 1990, the company sued Shimano for unfair business practices, noting that Shimano offered, in effect, a 10-percent discount to bicycle manufacturers specifying an all-Shimano drivetrain and that few companies in the highly competitive industry would be willing to forgo such a discount to specify Grip Shift components. SRAM received an unspecified out-of-court settlement from Shimano in 1991. As a result of this lawsuit, all Shimano competitors won the right to compete in the lucrative OEM bicycle component arena.

The years after the Shimano settlement were marked by growth for the company, as it increased sales and added other companies to its portfolio. SRAM is an example of a recent trend within the high-end cycle-component segment of the bicycle industry, where companies seek a position as a "one-stop shopping center" for bicycle frame manufacturers/bicycle brand owners, supplying all or most of the parts needed to build a complete bike. SRAM now incorporates the former bicycle divisions of Fichtel & Sachs, Sachs-Huret, and acquired component makers RockShox, Avid, Truvativ, Zipp, and QUARQ.

In 1995, SRAM introduced their first mountain bike rear derailleur, dubbed “ESP”, that featured a 1:1 cable actuation ratio that was more tolerant of cable contamination. The new derailleur was compatible with SRAM's ESP Grip Shifters. This was a first step for SRAM toward producing a complete shifting system. By 1997, SRAM was ready to make its first acquisition, Sachs. This acquisition provided SRAM with a group of metallurgists and engineers as well as a chain and internally geared hub production line.

SRAM released its first “X.O” rear derailleur in 2001. It was a complete redesign of SRAM's existing ESP derailleurs, however it still made use of SRAM's proprietary 1:1 shift actuation ratio for improved shifting performance with worn or contaminated cables. Made from forged aluminum, the introduction of SRAM's first high-end derailleur marked a turning point for the company's mountain bike shifting groups. The introduction of X.O also marked the first time trigger shifters were available as a shifting option for SRAM rear derailleurs.

In 2002, SRAM acquired suspension manufacturer, RockShox, after RockShox had defaulted on a loan from SRAM. In 2005, SRAM developed a new fork damper technology dubbed “Motion Control” that allowed users to adjust compression and rebound of the suspension, including a switch to greatly firm up the suspension. RockShox continues to use variants of the Motion Control damper on select models.

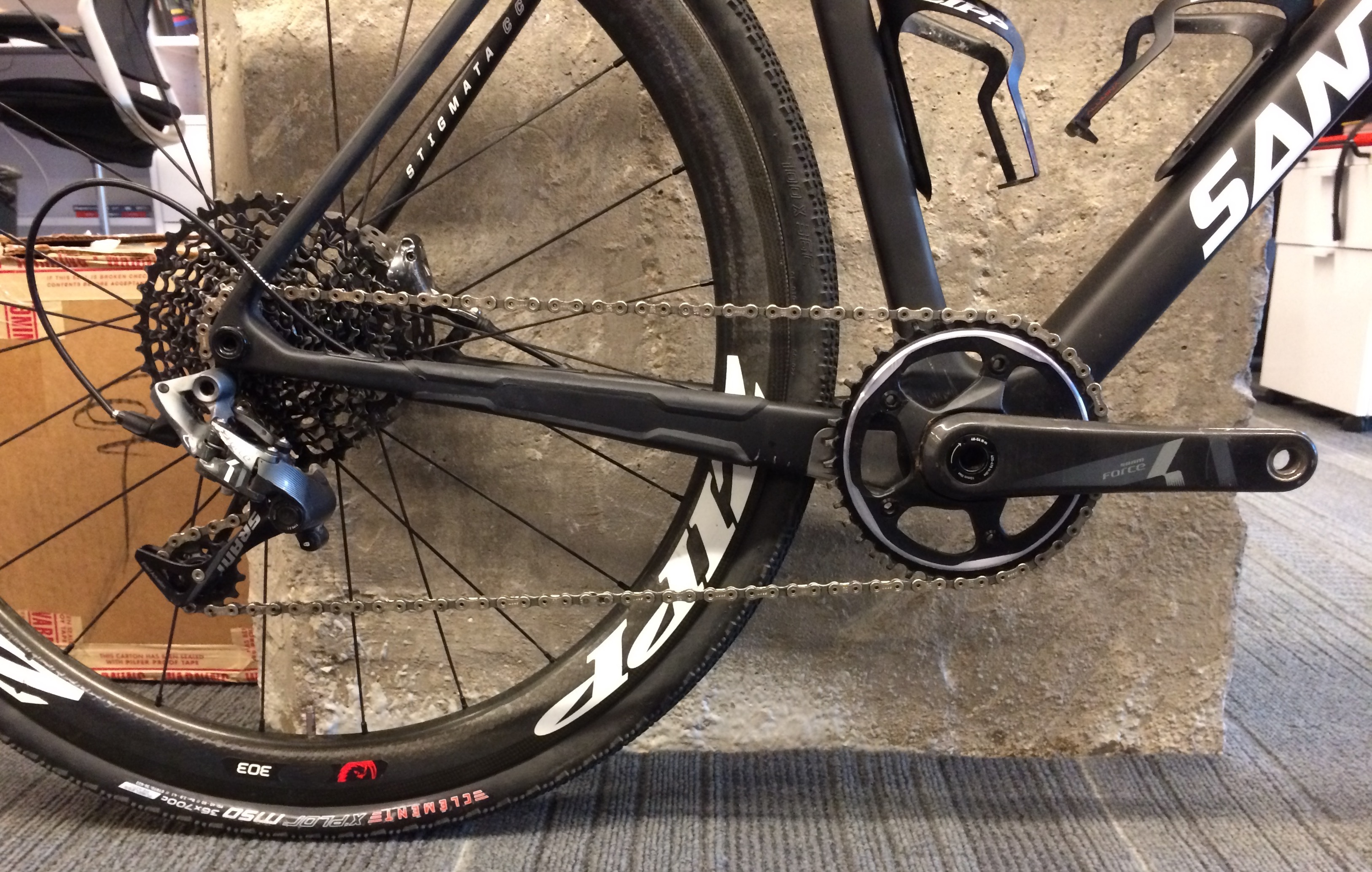
SRAM Force 1 drivetrain with 10-42 cassette.

Avid was SRAM's next acquisition in the spring of 2004. Avid produced popular hydraulic disc brakes and gave SRAM one more means to compete with Shimano. Later that same year, SRAM purchased Truvativ, a crank, bottom bracket, and chainring manufacturer based out of San Luis Obispo, California.

Although SRAM began as a manufacturer of road bike shifters, the company had largely left the road market in 1993 in favor of the rapidly growing mountain bike market. However in 2004, SRAM began developing two new road groupsets: Force and Rival, which it brought to market in 2006. Force was raced in the Tour de France for the first time the following year. The group made use of a new proprietary shifting technology known as DoubleTap. The technology allows the rider to shift a derailleur in both directions using a single shifter paddle.

In 2007, SRAM acquired the bicycle component company Zipp. In 2008, SRAM introduced a new road groupset, SRAM RED.

SRAM acquired power meter crank manufacturer Quarq in 2011. By 2012, SRAM had incorporated power meters into its high-end RED road group. Also in 2012, SRAM introduced wide range 1x11 mountain bike shifting with its XX1 groupset. The new groupset made use of a 10-42 cassette and a patented single front chainring that made use of both narrow and wide teeth to retain the chain without a chain guide. The rear derailleur for the groupset uses a parallelogram that moves only laterally, known as X-Horizon, which is intended to improve shifting precision and chain retention.

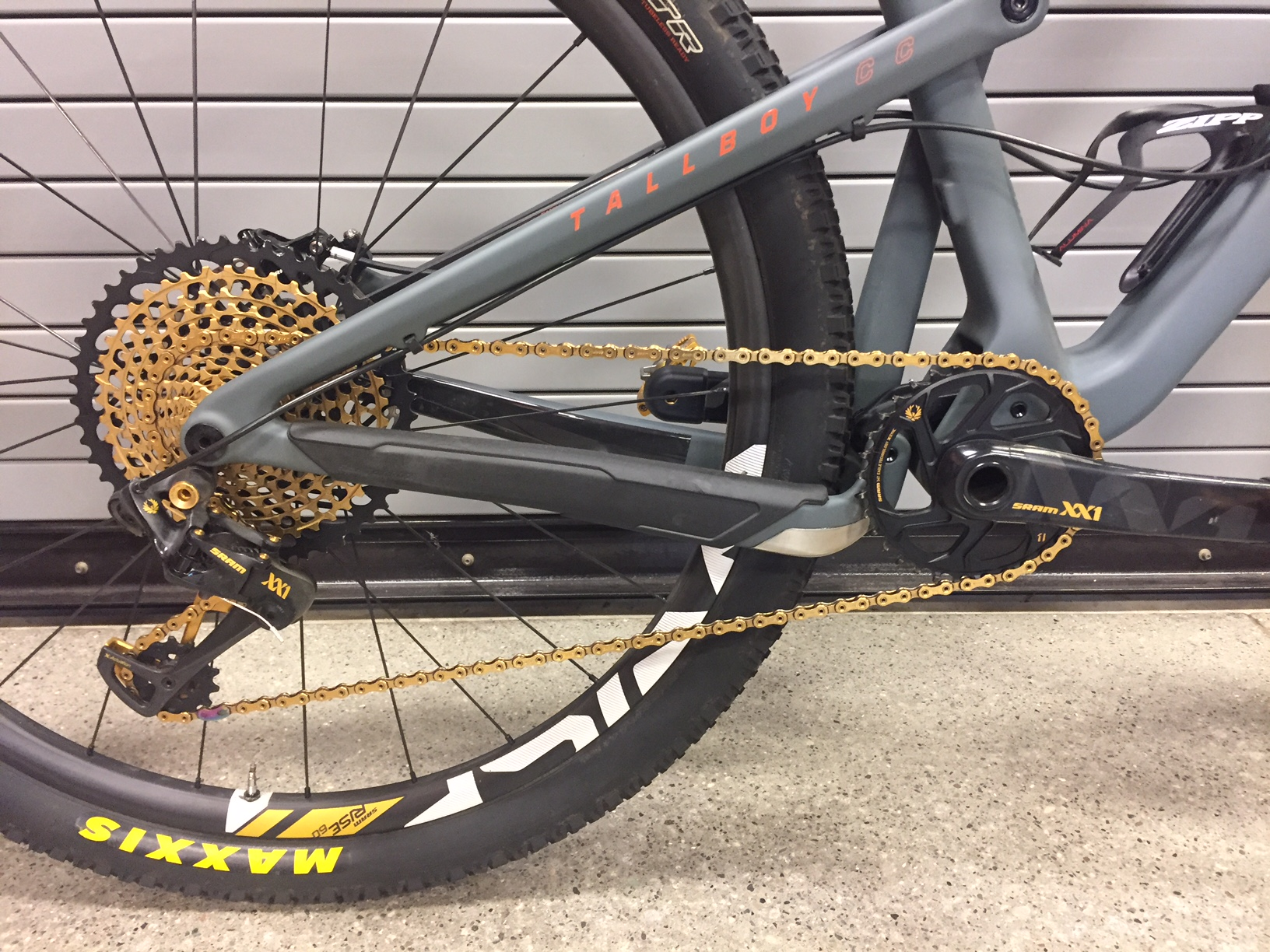
SRAM Eagle XX1 Drivetrain

By 2014, this same technology was adapted for use on cyclocross bikes with the introduction of SRAM Force CX1. The group was expanded in 2015 to use chainrings (up to 54-teeth) for other applications such as TT/Tri, road, and fitness bikes. With the expanded applications SRAM simplified the naming of the group to Force 1. The same year the company also developed a lower price point 1x11 road groupset option with similar features, Rival 1. In August 2015, SRAM announced that it would release its 11-speed wireless electronic road groupset, SRAM RED eTap. The group utilizes derailleurs with self-contained batteries to shift using wireless signals sent from the shift levers. Benefits of the system include more precise shifting, faster setup, and lower maintenance compared to a traditional mechanically activated shifting arrangement.

The company announced a hydraulic disc brake version of its wireless road group called SRAM RED eTap HRD in May 2016. The new brakes make use of a hydraulic lever design with both lever reach adjustment and lever contact point adjustment. In May 2016, SRAM also released their new 1x12 drivetrain technology dubbed Eagle in both XX1 and X01 variants. It has received many awards globally in its first year of public availability from cycling publications due to its simplicity, versatility, and usable rider benefits. The new 1x12 drivetrain has a 500% gear range that is comparable to many 2x drivetrains on the market today. In October 2016, SRAM released the WiFLi version of its eTap rear derailleur which is compatible with a wider range of gears than a standard rear derailleur.

In 2017, SRAM launched the 1x12 GX Eagle drivetrain, intended to be more affordable than the similar existing Eagle XX1 and X01 drivetrains.

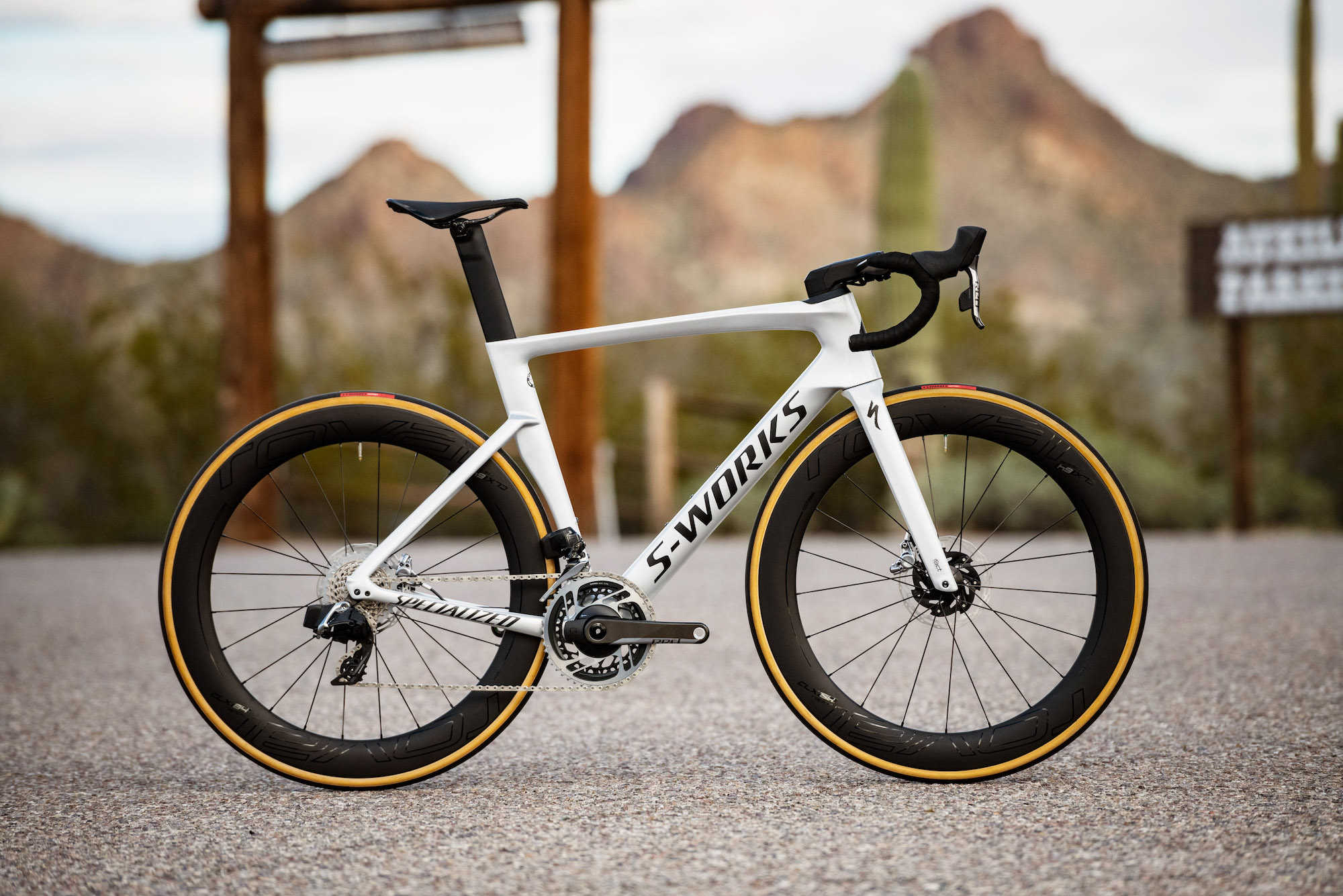
2019 Specialized S-Works Venge Disc eTap with SRAM RED eTap AXS HRD component group.

On February 6, 2019, SRAM released three new wireless electronic groupsets. This release included one road groupset, RED eTap AXS, and two mountain bike groupsets, XX1 Eagle AXS and X01 Eagle AXS. All of the AXS groups have BLE connectivity and an optional free mobile app called AXS that offers users the ability to reassign and customize button functions.

The new RED groupset features a 12-speed cassette with wider gear range and smaller steps between gears in addition to many other innovations such as chainrings with power meter integration, a fluid damper for the rear derailleur pulley cage, and both 2x and 1x chainring drivetrain variants.

For the new mountain bike groups, in addition to their wireless electronic operation, they can also connect with sister brand RockShox’ Reverb AXS dropper post. SRAM's AXS app makes this possible by enabling users to reassign button functions between the Reverb seat post and the XX1 or X01 derailleur controller. The same AXS app also opens the option of using RED eTap AXS drop bar levers with an Eagle AXS drivetrain and a Reverb AXS dropper post. Conversely, drop bar bikes can be retrofitted with mountain bike handlebars using the Eagle AXS derailleur controller with RED eTap AXS drivetrain.

In February 2021, SRAM announced the acquisition of the entire range of road and mountain pedals, cleats, and all related patents of TIME Sport from Rossignol Group. The companies completed the transaction on February 18, 2021. Founded in Nevers, France, in 1987, TIME’s clipless pedal system increased ergo-dynamic compliance for riders by engineering lateral and angular float into the pedal. TIME added mountain bike pedals in 1993. Their road and MTB pedals have been ridden to victory by many professionals, including Julien Absalon (FRA), Greg LeMond (USA), Tom Boonen (BEL), Anna van der Breggen (NED), and Miguel Indurain (ESP).

== Event sponsorships ==
SRAM supports racing through sponsorships made in partnership with race promoters. Examples of this include the Amgen Tour of California, Ironman, the Sea Otter Classic, and Crankworks.

At the Amgen Tour of California (ATOC), SRAM was the neutral race-support sponsor for both the women's and men's races and a title sponsor for the entire women's race. SRAM is also a sponsor of specific stages within the men's ATOC race.

SRAM has been the neutral race-support sponsor for numerous professional Ironman events including the US National Championships, European Championships, and World Championships. As a title sponsor for the Sea Otter Classic in Monterey, California for roughly a decade, SRAM provides neutral race support for entrants and hosts large product display and technical service tents in the event's expo area.

SRAM is also a supporter of the Crankworks festival held at the Whistler Bike Park in British Columbia, Canada.

On October 17, 2022 it was announced that SRAM was named an official supplier of the New York Yacht Club American Magic racing team in their bid to win the 37th America's Cup.

== Triathlon ==
In the late 1980s and early 1990s, SRAM Grip Shifters were adopted by triathletes. Grip Shift's aim to allow riders to shift without removing their hands from the bars made the product suited to the needs of triathletes. These racers needed to maintain an aero tuck with their hands extended on aero extensions, a place where Grip Shifters were designed to perch. It offered both SRAM and the athletes a competitive advantage at a time when there were few aerodynamic shifting options available.

SRAM sponsors a number of top athletes including Ironman world champion Jan Frodeno, Sebastien Kienle, Javier Gomez, Mirinda Carfrae, Alistair and Jonathan Brownlee, Caroline Steffen, Jordan Rapp, and Non Stanford.

== Women's cycling ==
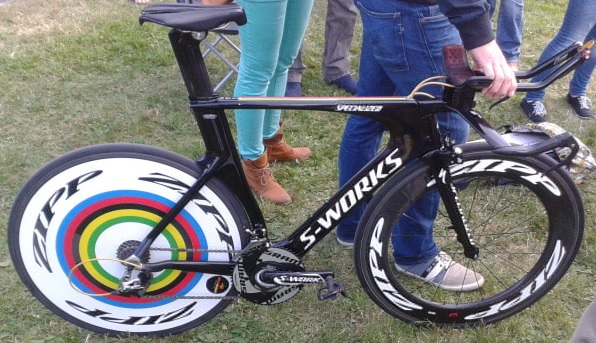
2014 time trial bike of world champion Ellen van Dijk with SRAM.

SRAM is among component manufacturers that have consistently assigned equal value to women's cycling. Products and technologies that reflect that commitment to the broad range of female riders’ needs include shifter Reach Adjust, Quarq cranksets available in down to 162.5 mm lengths, and 36 cm wide Zipp handlebars.

SRAM is also a supporter of women's professional cycling. SRAM is a title sponsor for the Women's Amgen Tour of California empowered with SRAM. The company also sponsors many teams in the women's World Tour including CANYON//SRAM Racing, Boels-Dolmans Cycling Team, Twenty20 p/b SHO-AIR, and Rally Cycling Team.

Top female athletes sponsored by SRAM include 2015 UCI Road World Champion Lizzie Armitstead, 2015 UCI Junior Road and Time Trial World Champion Chloe Dygert, 2014 UCI Elite Time Trial Champion Lisa Brennauer, and 2015 Amgen Tour of California empowered with SRAM winner Trixie Worrack.

== Brands ==
SRAM has purchased a number of companies, enabling it to offer a full set of componentry. At the forefront of the company is the SRAM marque which is used for most of its groupsets. Companies SRAM has purchased and converted into marque brands include Rockshox, Zipp, Avid, Truvativ, Quarq and TIME.

=== Sachs Bicycle Components ===
In November 1997, SRAM acquired Sachs Bicycle Components, including a significant hub gear production line, from Mannesmann Sachs AG, a unit of German telecommunications group Mannesmann AG. Sachs had 1,250 employees and annual revenues of more than $125 million. In 2013, production of internal gear hubs moved from Germany to Taiwan. In 2015, the former Sachs Schweinfurt factory was converted for use as a SRAM research and development center as well as a warehouse for European distribution. The remainder of the Sachs company (ZF Sachs) is now owned by ZF Friedrichshafen AG. ZF Sachs mainly deals in parts for motorized vehicles.

In 2017, SRAM announced it would end production of its internal gear hubs due to declining sales, a lack of interest on the part of its suppliers, and competition from e-bikes.

=== RockShox ===
SRAM purchased RockShox on February 19, 2002. RockShox was one of the first companies to introduce a bicycle suspension fork for consumer use. Marketing and sales departments were relocated to Chicago, while product development remained in Colorado Springs. A SRAM factory in Taichung, Taiwan was converted to RockShox production after the acquisition. RockShox is responsible for producing bicycle suspension products including front suspension forks for both mountain biking (MTB) and pavement usage, rear suspension, suspension lockout remotes, maintenance products and a dropper seatpost.

=== Avid ===
On March 1, 2004, SRAM purchased Avid, a designer and manufacturer of bicycle brake components. Its current line-up includes mechanical disc brakes, rim brakes, levers, cables and maintenance products for a range of uses including MTB and cyclocross. They also produce two road bike disc brakes. As with RockShox, Avid's product development continued in Colorado Springs while marketing and sales divisions were moved to Chicago.

=== Truvativ ===
SRAM purchased Truvativ in 2004 from Micki Kozuschek, providing SRAM with a line of cranks, bottom brackets, handlebars, stems, pedals, seatposts and chain retention systems. This allowed SRAM to offer a complete drivetrain with the first SRAM branded road groupsets being released the following year. Following the acquisition, product development for cranksets and bottom brackets remained in San Luis Obispo, California.

=== Zipp ===
On November 6, 2007, SRAM acquired Zipp Speed Weaponry, a company designing and manufacturing carbon wheelsets for use on road racing bicycles, as well as other high-end components such as cranksets, handlebars, stems and wheels. The company operates out of Indianapolis, Indiana and produces all of its carbon fiber rims at the company's US factory.

=== Quarq ===
In 2011, SRAM acquired power meter crank manufacturer, Quarq. Based out of Spearfish, South Dakota, Quarq was founded by Jim and Mieke Meyer. The company is best known for its crank based power meters, but it is venturing out into new areas with its Quarq Race Intelligence product, a live telemetry system aimed at race promoters, race officials, and media. Following the pattern set by other SRAM acquisitions, Quarq continues to operate out of its Spearfish location.

=== Hammerhead ===
In December 2021, SRAM acquired the cycling technology company, Hammerhead.

=== Velocio ===
In March 2022, SRAM acquired the high end apparel brand, Velocio.

== SRAM groupsets ==
=== Road & Gravel bike ===
As of August 2024, SRAM has five road bike groupsets (in descending order of price):

- RED
- RED XPLR
- Force: mechanical & electronic
- Rival: mechanical & electronic
- Apex

year	Groupset			
year	RED	Force	Rival	Apex
2006		Force: 10 speed	Rival: 10 speed	
2007	RED: 10 speed			
2008				
2009				
2010				Apex: 10 speed
2011				
2012	RED 2012: 10 speed	Force 2012: 10 speed		
2013	RED 22: 11 speed	Force 22: 11 speed		
2014		Force CX1: 1×11 speed	Rival 22: 11 speed	
2015	RED eTap A1: 11 speed	Force 1: 1×11 speed	Rival 1: 1×11 speed	
2016	RED eTap HRD: 11 speed			Apex 1: 1×11 speed
2017				
2018				
2019	RED eTap AXS: 12 speed	Force eTap AXS D1: 12 speed		
2020	RED eTap A2: 11 speed			
2021			Rival eTap AXS: 12 speed	
2022				
2023		Force eTap AXS D2: 12 speed		Apex: 1×12 speed Apex AXS: 1×12 speed
2024	RED eTap AXS: 12 speed RED XPLR AXS: 1×13 speed			
2025		Force AXS XPLR E1: 13 speed Force AXS E1: 12 speed	Rival AXS XPLR E1: 13 speed	Apex AXS XPLR: 12 speed

=== Mountain bike ===
SRAM currently has 20 mountain bike groupsets, divided by field of application, from most to least expensive:

Budget groupsets:

- X7 2x10 speed or 3x10 speed or 3x9 speed
- X5 2x10 speed or 3x10 speed or 3x9 speed
- X4
- X3

Cross Country:

- XX SL Eagle Transmission 1x12 speed
- XX1 Eagle AXS 1x12 speed
- XX1 Eagle 1x12 speed
- XX1 1x11 speed

Downhill:

- X01 DH 1x7 speed or 1x10 speed
- GX DH 1x7 speed

E-MTB specific:

- EX1 1x8 speed

Enduro:

- X0 Eagle Transmission 1x12 speed
- GX Eagle Transmission 1x12 speed
- X01 Eagle AXS 1x12 speed
- X01 Eagle 1x12 speed
- X01 1x11 speed
- X1 1x11 speed

Trail riding:

- XX Eagle Transmission 1x12 speed
- GX Eagle Transmission 1x12 speed
- GX Eagle AXS 1x12 speed
- GX Eagle 1x12 speed
- GX 1x11 speed or 2x11 speed or 2x10 speed
- NX Eagle 1x12 speed
- NX 1x11 speed
- SX Eagle 1x12 speed
- X0 2x10 speed
- X9 2x10 speed or 3x10 speed

Budget groupsets:

- X7 2x10 speed or 3x10 speed or 3x9 speed
- X5 2x10 speed or 3x10 speed or 3x9 speed
- X4
- X3

E-MTB specific gropsets:

- EX1 1x8 speed

== Corporate ==
In 2008, the company received a strategic investment from Trilantic Capital Partners, formerly known as Lehman Brothers Merchant Banking, the buyout arm of Lehman Brothers. The firm invested $234.8 million in SRAM in a deal that closed Sept. 30, 2008. On May 12, 2011, the company announced in a filing that it intended to raise up to $300 million in an IPO. Shortly later, the company consolidated its debt to pay off the assets owned by the private equity firm. Those plans were put on hold due to volatility in the stock market. SRAM reported net sales of $524.1 million in 2010, and has grown at a rate of about 16 percent annually in the four years prior to 2010. The company has estimated that it holds about 15 percent of the $3.5 billion bicycle components market.

=== Annual revenues ===
- 1987 $0 million
- 1994 $25 million
- 1995 $40 million
- 1999 $120 million
- 2001 $120 million
- 2003 $150 million
- 2004 $160 million (estimate)
- 2006 $283.8 million
- 2007 $356.0 million
- 2008 $478.4 million
- 2009 $399.6 million
- 2010 $524.2 million
- 2016 $640 million
- 2017 $725 million
- 2020 $974 million (2020)

== SRAM Cycling Fund ==
The SRAM Cycling Fund is the advocacy and philanthropy arm of SRAM LLC. The Fund invested $10M over 6 years from 2009 to 2014.

== See also ==
- Comparison of hub gears
- World Bicycle Relief, sponsored by SRAM
