= Gurley =

Gurley may refer to:

== People ==
- Gurley (surname)
- Gurley Brewer (1866–1919), African-American attorney, newspaper publisher and political activist

== Places ==
Australia:

- Gurley, New South Wales, a town

United States:

- Gurley, Alabama, a town
- Gurley, Louisiana, an unincorporated community
- Gurley, Nebraska, a village
- Gurley, Horry County, South Carolina

== Businesses ==
- Gurley Precision Instruments, an American manufacturing company
- Gurley (automobile company), American automobile company (1899–1901)
- Gurley Novelty, a defunct candle-making company

== See also ==
- W. & L. E. Gurley Building, the Gurley Precision Instruments's National Historic Landmark building
