= Wheelset =

Wheelset may refer to:

- A pair of bicycle wheels
- Wheelset (rail transport), a pair of railroad vehicle wheels mounted rigidly on an axle
