= Gurrey =

Gurrey is a surname. Notable people with the surname include:

- Alfred Richard Gurrey Sr. (1852–1944), English-born American painter
- Caitlin Gurrey (born 1995), New Zealand cricketer
- Caroline Haskins Gurrey (1875–1927), American photographer

== See also ==
- Gurley (surname)
- Gurney (surname)
