= ISO 5775 =

International standard for labeling the size of bicycle tires and rims

ISO 5775 is an international standard for labeling the size of bicycle tires and rims. The system used was originally developed by the European Tyre and Rim Technical Organisation (ETRTO), and is now managed by the ISO. It is designed to make tire sizing consistent and clear, through replacing overlapping informal systems that ambiguously distinguished between sizes. For example, at least 6 different "26 inch" sizes exist (just by American notation), and "27 inch" wheels have a larger diameter than American "28 inch" (French "700C") wheels. This standard uses the bead seat diameter (BSD) as a measurement for rim and tyre widths and diameters. The Japanese Industrial Standards Committee also cooperates with ISO 5775. The corresponding Japanese standards are JIS D 9112 for tires and JIS D 9421 for rims.

Part 1, which addresses tyres' designations and dimensions, was last published in August 2023 and Part 2, addressing rims, was last published in March 2021.

Part 1 considers tyres' nomenclature, size designation, marking, dimensions and compatibility with different rims and rim widths.

Part 2 considers both general requirements and specific requirements for 5 sub types of rim: straight-sided, tubeless straight-sided, hooked bead, crochet type (not the same as hooked bead type), and tubeless crochet type rims.

== Tire designations and dimensions ==
Part 1 considers separately the cases of

1. clincher tyres mounted on straight sided type or crochet type rims, and
2. hooked bead rims on which beaded edge tyres are mounted.

=== Clincher tyres on straight sided or crochet type rims ===
Clincher tires can be mounted on straight-side or crochet-type rims. Crochet-type rims are not the same as hooked-bead rims. Such tires are designated with their nominal section width and their nominal rim diameter, separated by a hyphen (-). Both are measured in millimeters. A typical example of a tire marking according to ISO 5775-1 is:

32-597 inflate to 400 kPa

- The first number (nominal section width) is essentially the width of the inflated tire (minus any tread).
- The second number (nominal rim diameter) is the bead diameter of the tire when it is mounted on the rim, also called the bead seat diameter. The corresponding circumference can be measured with a suitably narrow tape inside the rim.
- The recommended inflation pressure is marked in kilopascals.

The standard notes that the minimum inflation pressure recommended is 300 kPa for narrow tires (25 mm section width or less), 200 kPa for other sizes in normal highway service, and 150 kPa for off-the-road service.

The inner width of the rim on which the tire is mounted should be about 65% of the tire's nominal section width for tires smaller than 30 mm and 55% for those larger.

The section height of a tire is usually identical to its section width (for tires less than 28 mm, 2.5 mm have to be added to the width to get the height). The overall diameter of the tire is then the rim diameter plus twice the tire's section height. The ISO 5775-1 standard also defines procedures for measuring tires and for calculating from the marking the maximum dimensions of a tire, which are needed by designers to determine clearance distances to other bicycle components.

==== Nominal section widths (tyres) ====
The standard defines for each tire size a rim design width based on the tire's nominal section width, and the range of rims widths which are recommended as acceptable to be used in service for a given tire section width.

Rim widths for each tire size (mm)
Nominal tire section width		Design rim width	Recommended acceptable rim width in use	
Min	Max	Design rim width	Min	Max
18	19	15	13	15
20	21	15	13	17
22	24	17	13	20
25	27	19	13	22
28	28	19	15	23
29	34	21	16	25
35	46	23	17	27
47	57	25	17	30
58	65	30	21	35
66	71	35	25	43
72	83	45	31	53
84	95	55	41	64
96	113	76	59	89
114	132	94	72	100

==== Older markings ====
Note how in the below sorted table the "inches" measure is inconsistent with the mm measures, if height varies: Some 28-inch tires then have a measured actual bead seat diameter (BSD) smaller than a 27-inch tire. 584 mm tires are also marketed as 27.5-inch (outer diameter) tires. Older tire markings can be converted to ISO 5775 designations with the help of the following table:

Conversion Table
Actual bead diameter (mm)	ISO tyre size designation	Old markings (tyre outer diameter)	
Actual bead diameter (mm)	ISO tyre size designation	Inches	Millimetres
590	28-590	26 × 1 3/8 × 1 1/8	
622	28-622	28 × 1 5/8 × 1 1/8	700 × 28 C
622	28-622	28 × 1 5/8 × 1 1/4 × 1 1/8	700 C Carrera
630	28-630	27 × 1 1/4	
635	28-635	28 × 1 1/2	700 B
642	28-642	28 × 1 3/8 × 1 1/8	700 × 28 A
239	32-239	12 × 1 3/8 × 1 1/4	300 × 32
248	32-248	12 × 1 1/4	300 × 32 A
288	32-288	14 × 1 3/8 × 1 1/4	350 × 32
298	32-298	14 × 1 1/4	350 × 32 A
340	32-340	16 × 1 3/8 × 1 1/4	400 A
340	32-340		400 × 32
349	32-349	16 × 1 1/4 NL	400 × 32 A
357	32-357	17 × 1 1/4	
369	32-369	17 × 1 1/4	
390	32-390	18 × 1 3/8 × 1 1/4	450 A
390	32-390		450 × 32
400	32-400	18 × 1 1/4	450 × 32 A
406	32-406	20 × 1 1/4	
438	32-438		500 × 32 ANL
440	32-440	20 × 1 3/8 × 1 1/4	500 A
440	32-440		500 × 32
451	32-451	20 × 1 1/4	500 × 32 A
489	32-489		550 × 32 ANL
490	32-490	22 × 1 3/8 × 1 1/4	550 A
490	32-490		550 × 32
501	32-501	22 × 1 1/4	550 × 32 A
508	32-508	22 × 1 1/4 × 1	
540	32-540	24-1 3/8 × 1 1/4	
541	32-541	24 × 1 3/8 × 1 1/4 NL	600 A
541	32-541		600 × 32 A
547	32-547	24 × 1 1/4	
590	32-590	26 × 1 3/8 1 1/4	650 × 32 A
597	32-597	26 × 1 1/4	
622	32-622	28 × 1 5/8 × 1 1/4	700 × 32 C
622	32-622	28 × 1 1/4 × 1 3/4	700 × C Course
630	32-630	27 × 1 1/4	
635	32-635	28 × 1 1/2 × 1 1/8	700 × 28 B
635	32-635		700 B Course
288	37-288		350 A Comfort
288	37-288		350 A 1/2 Balloon
298	37-298	14 × 1 3/8	
337	37-337	16 × 1 3/8 ANL	
340	37-340	16 × 1 3/8 NL	400 A Comfort
340	37-340		400 A 1/2 Balloon
340	37-340		400 × 42 A
340	37-340		400 × 35 A
349	37-349	16 × 1 3/8 NL	
387	37-387	18 × 1 3/8	
390	37-390		450 A Comfort
390	37-390		450 A 1/2 Balloon
400	37-400	18 × 1 3/8	
406	37-406	20 × 1 3/8	
438	37-438	20 × 1 3/8 NL	
440	37-440		500 A Comfort
440	37-440		500 A 1/2 Balloon
451	37-451	20 × 1 3/8	
489	37-489	22 × 1 3/8 NL	
490	37-490		550 A Comfort
490	37-490		550 A 1/2 Balloon
498	37-498	22 × 1 3/8 × 1 1/4 NL	
501	37-501	22 × 1 3/8	
540	37-540	24 × 1 3/8	
541	37-541		600 A Comfort
541	37-541		600 A 1/2 Balloon
541	37-541		600 × 35 A
565	37-565	25 × 1 3/8	
584	37-584	27.5 × 2.0 × 2.5	
584	37-584	26 × 1 3/8 × 1 1/2	650 × 37 B
590	37-590	26 × 1 3/8	650 A
590	37-590		650 × 35 A
622	37-622	28 × 1 5/8 × 1 3/8	700 × 35 C
622	37-622	28 × 1 3/8 1 5/8	
642	37-642	28 × 1 3/8	700 × 35 A
279	40-279	14 × 1 1/2	350 × 38 B
288	40-288	14 × 1 1/2 NL	350 × 38
330	40-330	16 × 1 1/2	400 × 38 B
406	40-406	20 × 1 1/2	
432	40-432	20 × 1 1/2	
440	40-440	20 × 1 1/2 NL	500 × 38
534	40-534	24 × 1 1/2	
540	40-540	24 × 1 3/8 × 1 1/2	
540	40-540	24 × 1 1/2 × 1 3/8	
559	40-559	24 × 1.5	
571	40-571	26 × 1 1/2 C.S.	
571	40-571	26 × 1 5/8 × 1 1/2 NL	
584	40-584	26 × 1 1/2	650 × 40 B
584	40-584		650 × 38 B
590	40-590	26 × 1 3/8 × 1 1/2 NL	
622	40-622	28 × 1 5/8 × 1 1/2 NL	700 × 38 C
635	40-635	28 × 1 1/2 × 1 3/8	700 B Standard
635	40-635	28 × 1 1/2	700 × 35 B
635	40-635		700 × 38 B
194	44-194	10 × 1 5/8	
288	44-288	14 × 1 3/8 × 1 5/8	350 A
288	44-288		350 × 42 A
340	44-340	16 × 1 5/8	
428	44-428	20 × 1 5/8 × 1 1/2	
484	44-484	22 × 1 5/8 × 1 1/2	
531	44-531	24 × 1 5/8 × 1 1/2	
584	44-584	26 × 1 1/2 × 1 5/8	650 B Semi-comfort
584	44-584	26 × 1 5/8 × 1 1/2	650 B 1/2 Balloon
584	44-584	26 × 1 3/4 × 1 1/2	650 × 42 B
622	44-622	28 × 1 5/8	700 × 42 C
635	44-635	28 × 1 5/8 × 1 1/2	
635	44-635	28 × 1 1/2 × 1 5/8	
584	45-584	26 × 1.75 × 1 1/2	650 × 45 B
584	45-584	26 × 1 1/2 × 1 3/4	
203	47-203	12 1/2 × 1.75 × 2 1/4	
222	47-222	11 × 1 3/4	
305	47-305	16 × 1.75 × 2	
317	47-317	16 × 1 3/4	
355	47-355	18 × 1.75 × 2	
406	47-406	20 × 1.75 × 2	
406	47-406	20 × 1.75	
419	47-419	20 × 1 3/4	
457	47-457	22 × 1.75	
501	47-501 T	24 × 1 3/4 R	600 × 45 C
507	47-507	24 × 1.75 × 2	
507	47-507	24 × 1.75	
520	47-520	24 × 1 3/4	
559	47-559	26 × 1.75 × 2	
559	47-559	26 × 1.75	
571	47-571	26 × 1 3/4	650 × 45 C
571	47-571	26 × 1 5/8	650 C S.C.
622	47-622	28 × 1 3/4	700 × 45 C
622	47-622	28 × 1.75	
622	47-622	28 × 15/8 1 3/4	
406	50-406	20 × 1.95	
406	52-406	20 × 1.95	
559	53-559	26 × 1.95	
298	54-298	14 × 2 × 1 3/4	
305	54-305	16 × 2	
400	54-400	20 × 2 × 1 3/4	
400	54-400	20 × 2 F 4 J	
406	54-406	20 × 2.00	
428	54-428	20 × 2	
559	54-559	26 × 2.00	
571	54-571	26 × 1 3/4 × 2	
571	54-571	26 × 2 × 1 3/4	
571	54-571	26 × 2	650 × 50 C
584	54-584	26 × 2 × 2 1/2	
584	54-584	26 × 1 1/2 × 2	
609	54-609	28 × 2	
239	57-239		300 × 55 A
251	57-251 T		315 × 55
305	57-305	16 × 2.125	
305	57-305	16 × 2.125 × 2	
390	57-390		450 × 55 A
406	57-406	20 × 2.125	
406	57-406	20 × 2.125 × 2	
507	57-507	24 × 2.125	
507	57-507	24 × 2.125 × 2	
559	57-559	26 × 2.125	
559	57-559	26 × 2.125 × 2	
203	62-203	12 1/2 × 2 1/4	320 × 57
305	62-305	16 × 2.5	
203	67-203	13 × 2 1/2	330 × 65
381	67-381	20 × 2 1/2	

Such older markings can be appended to the ISO 5775 designation in parentheses.

=== Beaded-edge tires ===
Beaded-edge tires are mounted on hooked-bead rims. They are marked with an overall diameter code and a nominal section-width code, separated by a cross (×). An example for such a marking is

20×1.375

== Rims ==
Part 2 defines designations for bicycle rims. It distinguishes between

- Straight-side (SS) type rims
- Tubeless straight-side (TSS) type rims
- Crochet (C) type rims
- Tubeless crochet type rims
- Hooked-bead (HB) rims

Both crochet (C) and hooked-bead (HB) rims have inner profiles that curve inwards near the outside diameter of the rim to provide a hook that helps retain the tire bead under high pressure. On modern bikes crochet rims are most common and hooked bead rims are rare. The distinction is primarily that hooked-bead rims lack the defined bead seat of straight side and Crochet-type rims. The tire is held in position radially by the hook without a bead seat playing a role. Without a bead seat, the primary designation of the diameter in terms of the bead seat is not applicable, and the governing diameter is the OD.

Rims are designated by their nominal rim diameter and their nominal width, separated by a cross (×). Both are measured in millimeters. The rim type codes SS or HB precede the rim designation, whereas code C is appended to the nominal width. Examples:

SS 400×20, HB 422×25, 620×13C

The nominal width of a rim is the inner width between the straight sides or beads as one can easily measure it with a caliper (see the standard for drawings and exact measurement procedures).

The standard widths of straight-side rims are:

18, 20, 22, 24, 27, 30.5

The standard widths of crochet-type rims are:

13C, 15C, 16C, 17C, 19C, 21C, 23C, 25C

The standard widths of hooked-bead rims are:

20, 25, 27

The diameters of straight-side and crochet-type rims are measured as the bead seat diameter (BSD). Standard values are:

194, 203, 222, 239, 248, 251, 279, 288, 298, 305, 317, 330, 337, 340, 349, 355, 357, 369, 381, 387, 390, 400, 406, 419, 428, 432, 438, 440, 451, 457, 484, 489, 490, 498, 501, 507, 520, 531, 534, 540, 541, 547, 559, 565, 571, 584, 590, 597, 609, 622, 630, 635, 642

The diameters of hooked-bead rims are measured as the outside diameter of the rim (not the tire). Standard values are:

270, 321, 372, 422, 459, 473, 510, 524, 560, 575, 611

== See also ==
- Bicycle wheel
