= Spoke nipple =

Bicycle part which connects the wheel rim to the spokes

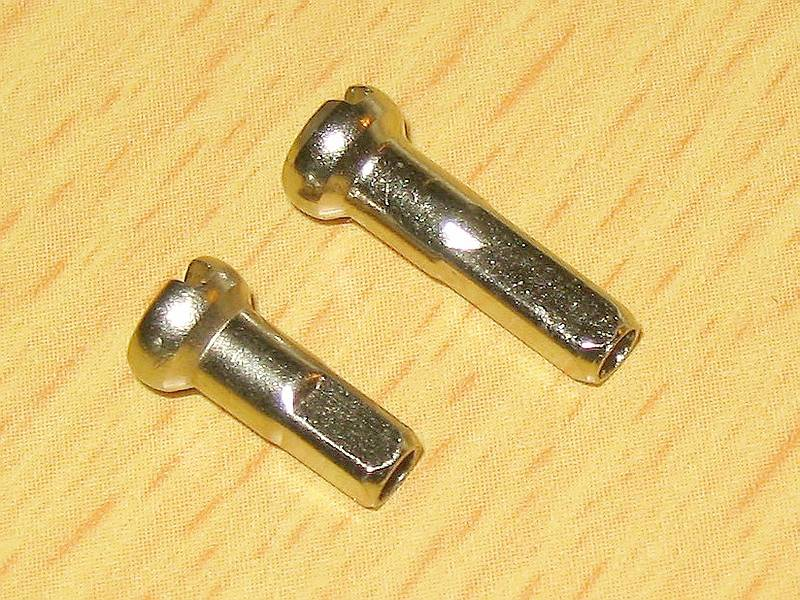
Nipples 12 and 16 mm

Directions to turn spoke nipples to true a wheel

A spoke nipple holds a bicycle wheel's rim to each spoke.

The spoke nipple is a headed cylinder with threading on the inside through part of its length (there is an unthreaded lead-in nearest the "flats"). Traditionally, the nipples fit in holes in the rim, so that the head of the nipple is on the outermost part of the rim, while the other end of the nipple points inwards towards the hub. Many different types of nipples are now available, including internal nipples that sit entirely within the rim and can only be adjusted by removing the tire, as well as externally threaded nipples that thread into the rim (such as those used by Mavic Ksyriums). The threading grasps the spoke, so turning it increases or decreases tension in the spoke and influences the position of the hub relative to the rim.

Thread pitch can vary with thread size, but is 0.454mm for common spoke thicknesses, which use thread types Fg 2, Fg 2.3 or Fg 2.6. Since spoke threading and nipple threading must match, boxes of spokes usually include a similar number of nipples. Weight savings or the need for great strength due to building a wheel with few spokes might call for obtaining different nipples from those shipped with the spokes. Standard materials for nipples are brass (usually nickel-plated) and aluminum. Brass is heavier but more durable and less prone to corrosion, rounding of flats while tightening, breaking and galling; aluminum is far lighter. If using aluminum nipples, the spokes should be long enough to engage the full length of spoke nipple threads so that the load is carried from the spoke to the top of the nipple. If the spoke is only part way into the nipple, the nipple carries the tension load and is prone to breaking from fatigue failure. Also, with aluminum nipples care and a good spoke wrench are needed to avoid rounding the flats while tightening. Recently, titanium nipples have become available from both US and Chinese sources. Proponents of titanium nipples suggest that they combine the advantages of brass and aluminum nipples (strength and weight, respectively), while being more corrosion resistant than either material.

== See also ==
- Spoke wrench, for a discussion on the three major nipple sizes
