= Spoke wrench =

Tool for adjusting spoke tension in a spoked wheel

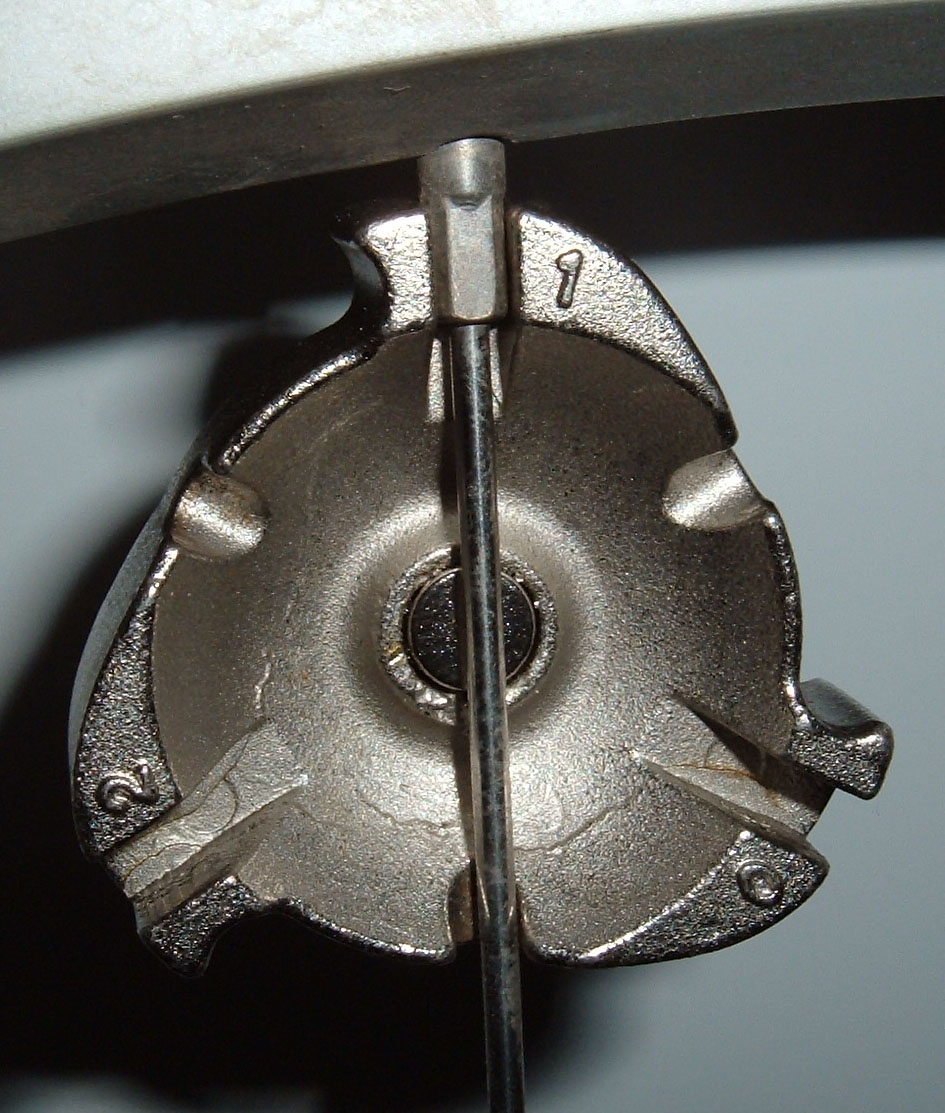
A spoke wrench that fits three common nipple sizes

A spoke wrench or spoke key is a small wrench or tool used to adjust the tension in the spokes of a tension-spoked wheel. A spoke wrench is sometimes called a nipple wrench, as it is the spoke nipple – not the spoke – that is turned in the process of changing the tension of a spoke.

== Overview ==
Spoke nipples are typically T-shaped in cross section, with an internal thread running part of the way through the hole that runs along the spoke nipple's principal axis. A spoke nipple rests in a hole drilled radially through the wheel's rim, and the nipple is threaded onto the external thread of a spoke. The spoke itself is fixed, at its other end, through a hole in the hub. The spoke and nipple are functionally equivalent to a bolt and a nut. However, unlike a typical nut-and-bolt pair, a spoke and nipple do not join two parts (the rim and the hub) so much as bridge them, under tension.

The area of the nipple around which the spoke wrench, or key, is fitted is generally square in cross-section. The tool grips the square of the nipple on either 3 or 4 sides; the latter type has a small cutout to enable it to be fitted over a spoke, after which it may be slid along to engage all four flats of the nipple. Gripping all four sides of the nipple results in less chance of rounding off the nipple than the 3-sided type, but is slower to use.

== Sizes ==
Common Spoke Sizes
Spoke Wire Gauge (traditional)	Spoke Gauge (metric)
15	1.8mm
14	2.0mm
13	2.3mm
12	2.6mm

Spoke Wrench Size does not correlate to Spoke Gauge. For example, a 3.23mm Spoke Wrench might be used on 15ga, 14ga, and even 13ga.

Nipple Wrench Size (metric)	Nipple Wrench Size (imperial)	Common Usage
3.23mm	.127"	Alloy & Brass (DT-Swiss, Wheelsmith, Sapim, Pillar, others)
3.30mm	.130"	Brass (many manufacturers)
3.40mm	.134"	Shimano Wheel Systems (e.g. WH-501)
3.45mm	.136"	Brass (various Asian manufacturers)
3.96mm	.156"	E-bike, Cargo Bikes, Shimano Wheel Systems (i.e C50/C24/RS10/RS30)

== Use ==
Directions to turn spoke nipples to true a wheel

A spoke wrench is used during the assembly, maintenance, or repair of bicycle wheels to adjust the tension of the spokes. The goal common to these activities is to bring the wheel (nearer) to the state of true — namely, a wheel in which the rim is:

1. a circle concentric with the axis of the axle in the hub, and
2. planar, such that the plane of the rim is centered laterally between the two extremes of the axle where it is supported in a frame.

A further goal it is to adjust the tension of the spokes so that they are brought as close to equal tension on each side of a wheel as is possible given the initial properties of the wheel's rim. This act of equalizing tension is called tension balancing and results in a stronger wheel. On modern bicycles, considerable space is needed for multi-speed clusters of gears as well as disc brakes; this means that there are usually two lengths of spokes on each wheel, one length per side. The act of shifting over the centerline of the rim between axle locknuts is referred to as dishing the wheel. A wheel calibrated so that the planar centerline of the rim corresponds the vertical centerline of the finished bicycle is referred to as properly dished.

By increasing or decreasing the tension of individual spokes, or groups of spokes, around the circumference, a wheelbuilder or bicycle mechanic can correct for local deviations from true – e.g. wobbles, or hops.

== Gallery ==
Various types of spoke wrenches

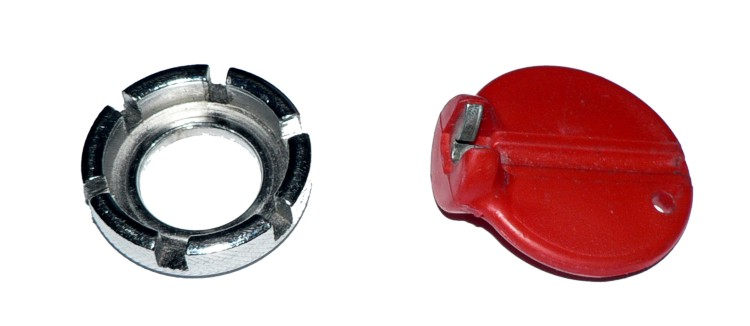

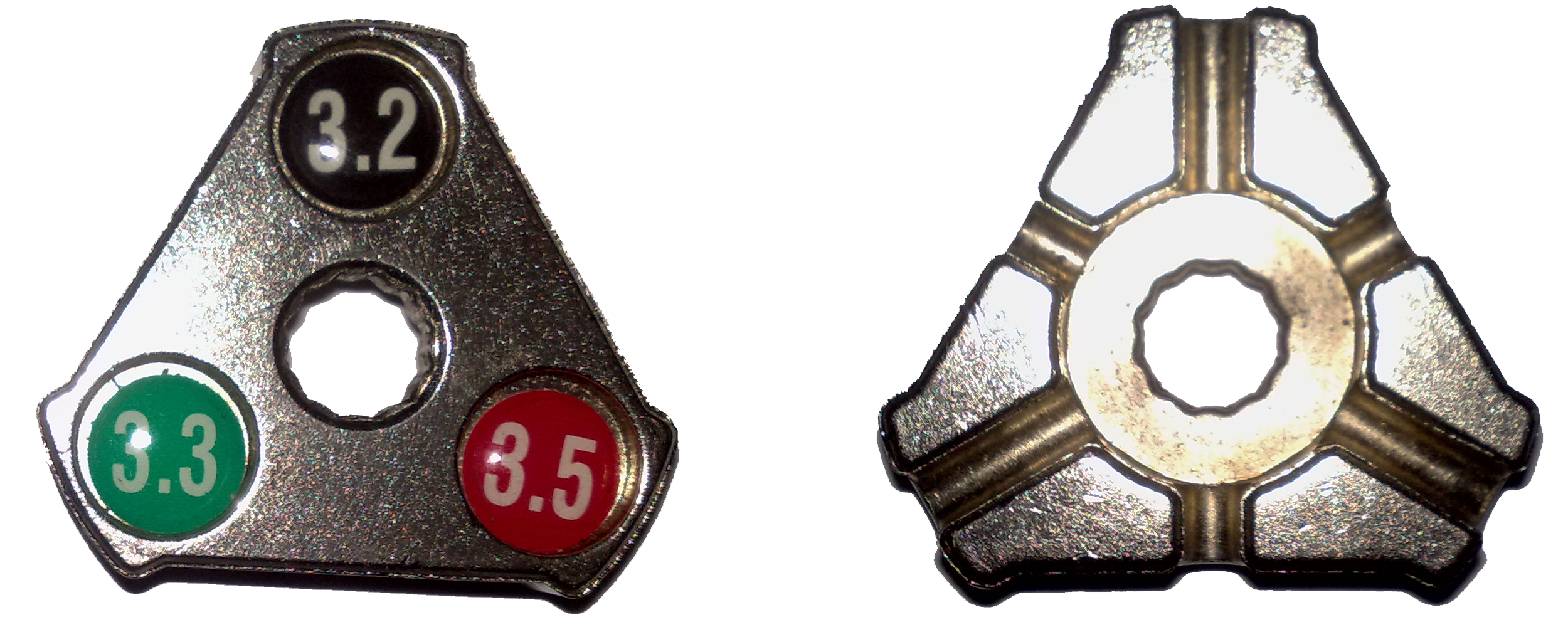

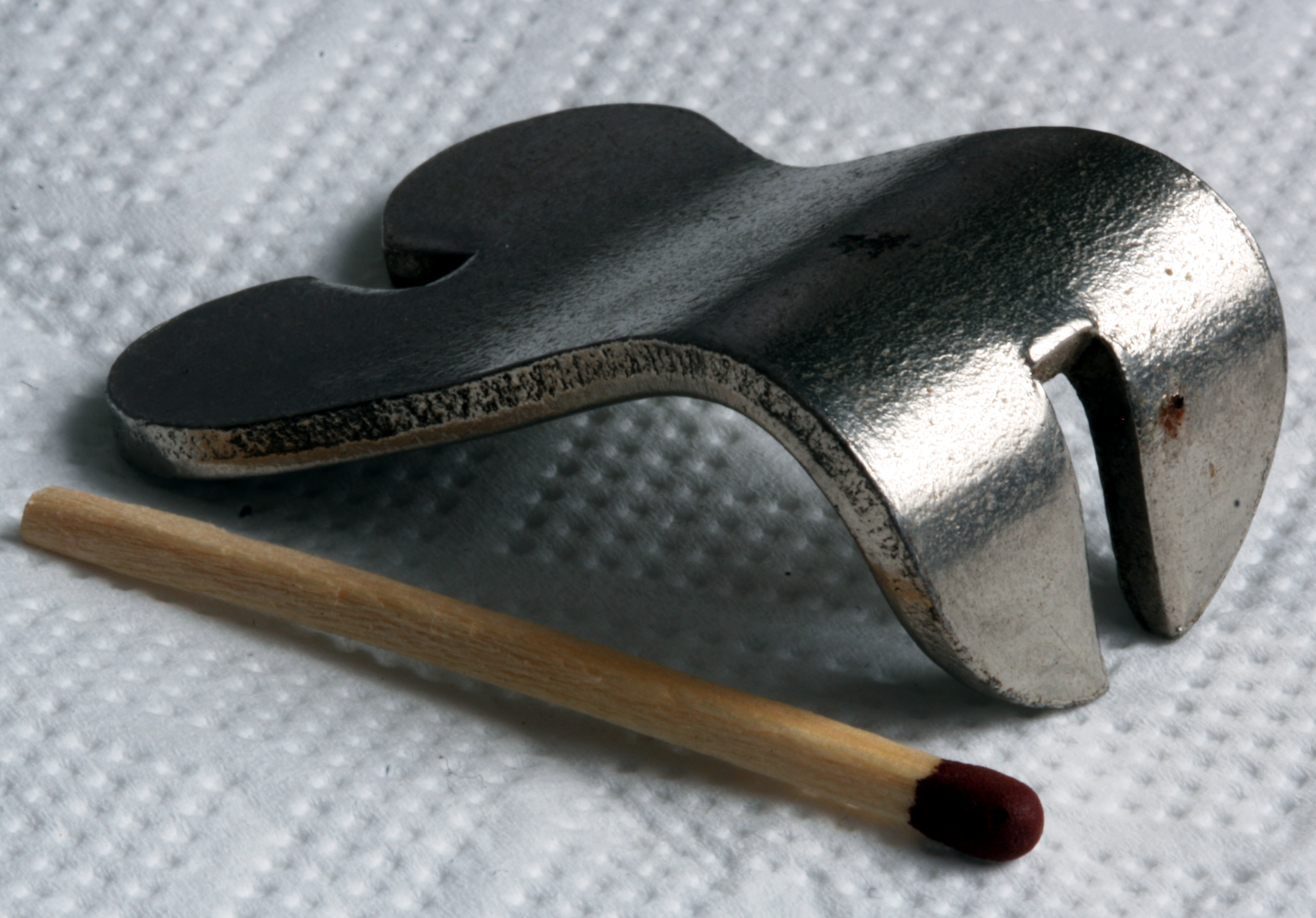

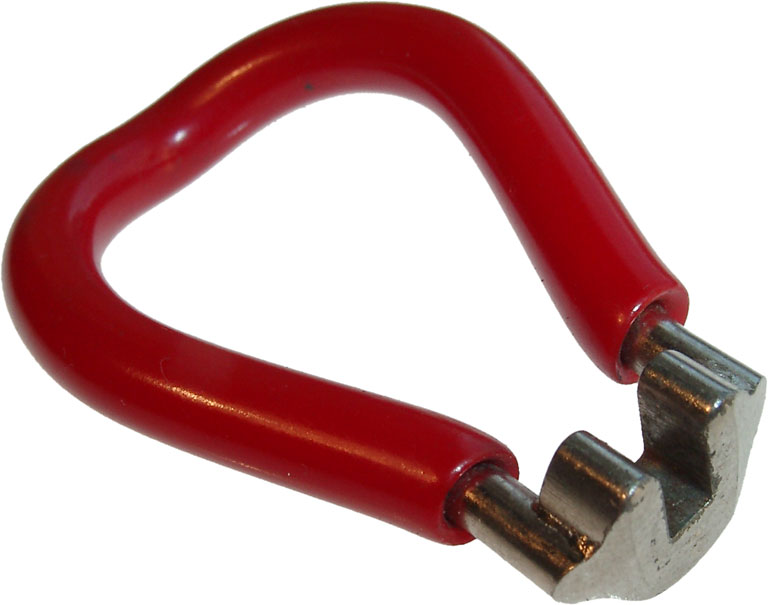

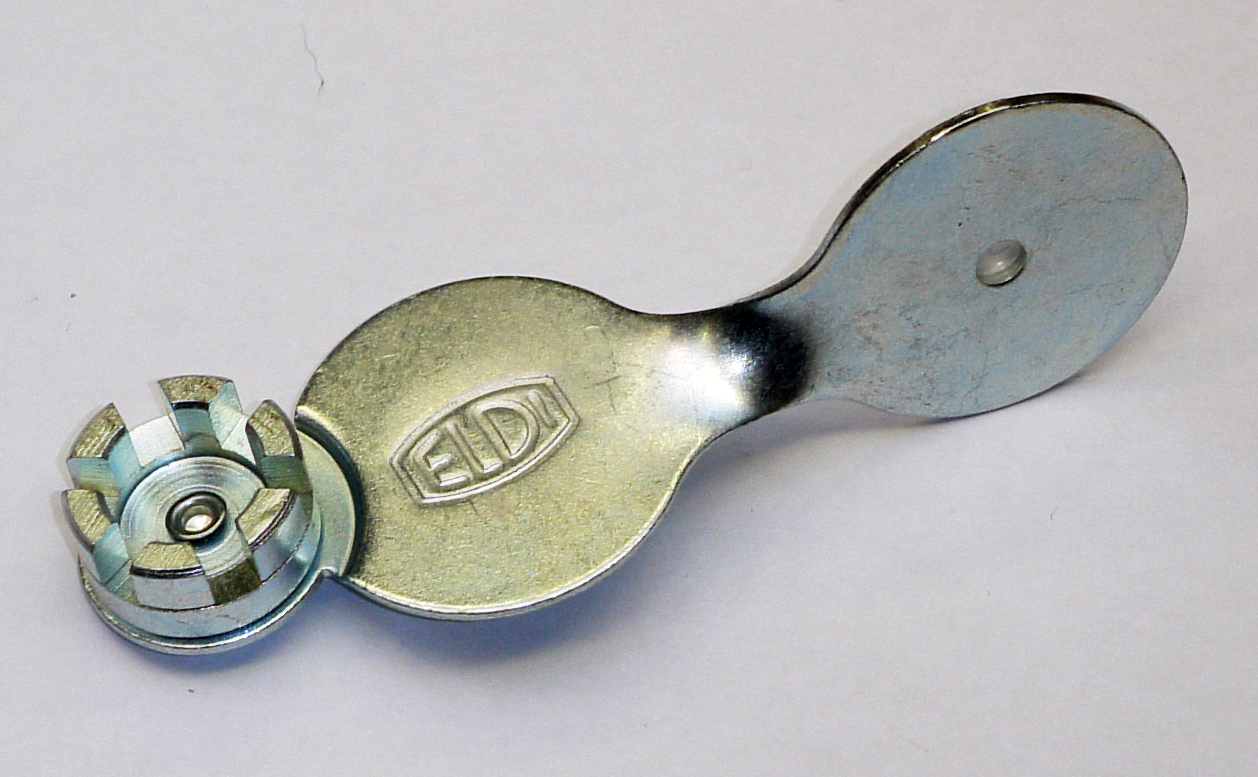

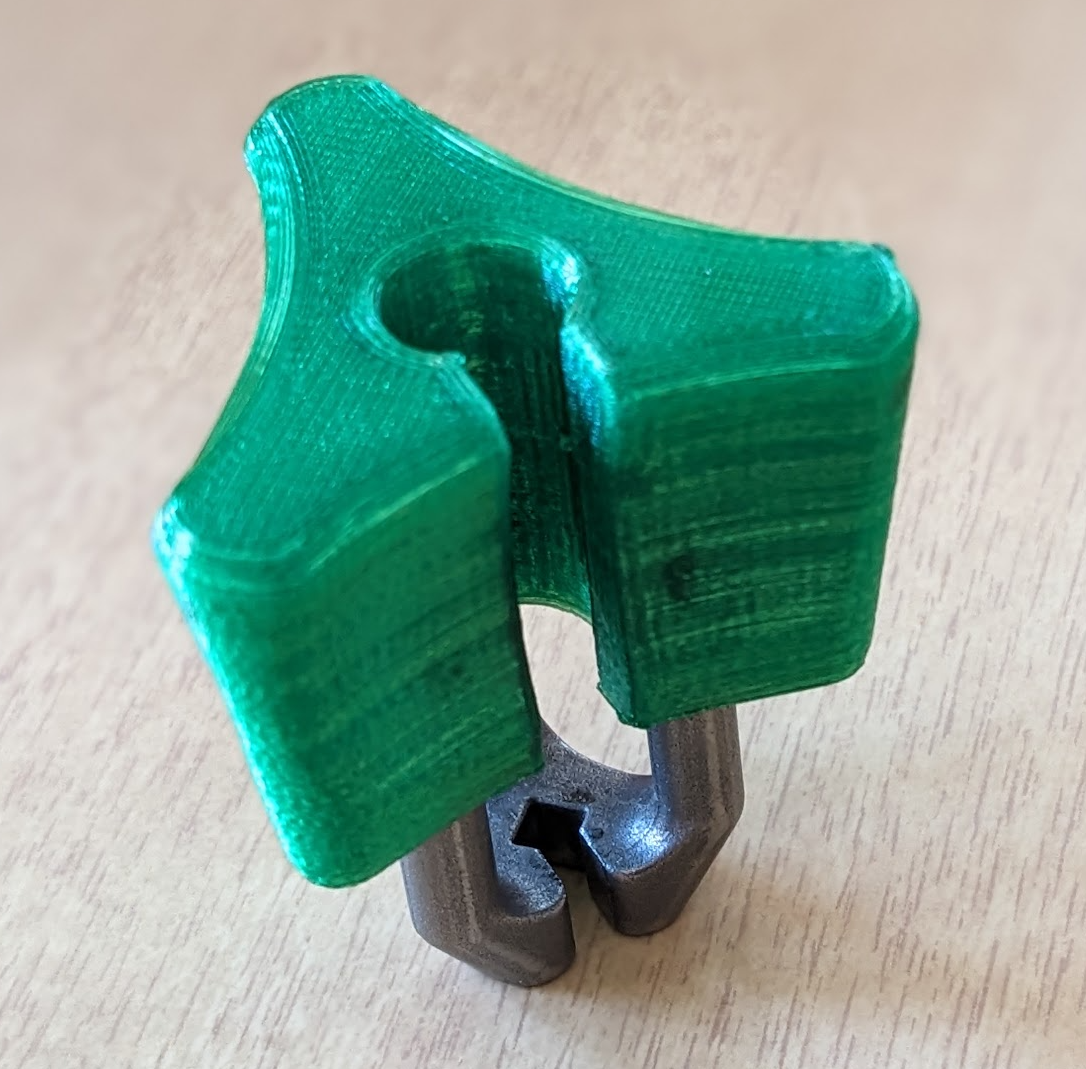
