= Gurley (automobile company) =

Defunct American motor vehicle manufacturer

Gurley was an automobile manufacturing company based in Meyersdale, Pennsylvania.

== Foundation ==
Tom Gurley was a jeweller and bookseller who also sold and repaired bicycles. This lead him into the manufacture of cars. In partnership with his brother Oscar, Gurley also established the first automobile dealership and garage in Meyersdale.

== Vehicles ==
In 1900, Gurley launched a two-seater buggy with a single-cylinder engine, tubular frame, bicycle wheels and tiller steering, which Gurley built in his bicycle shop. Gurley thought that he could make a profit by selling them at $600, but had to raise the price to $1,000. Very few were made and Gurley ended manufacture in 1901.
