= European Tyre and Rim Technical Organisation =

Motor standards organisation

The European Tyre and Rim Technical Organisation (ETRTO) exists to specify and harmonise sizes of rims and their associated pneumatic tyres across Europe. ETRTO sizes apply to rims and tyres for vehicles of all types. It is probably most well-known for size standardisation of bicycle tires designations in millimeters, which replaces many older national methods for referring to tire sizes that are incompatible. The great advantage of ETRTO sizing is that it is unambiguous; previously, nominal dimensions were used which were interpreted in different ways by different countries and manufacturers - a problem for the end user.

ETRTO works in liaison with the International Organization for Standardization to develop relevant standards.

== Motivation ==
Previously, one could for example risk buying a 28 inch tire for a 28 inch rim, with the result that the tire would not fit since 28" can refer to rim bead diameters of either 635 mm or 622 mm. Thus, a tire for one type of 28" inch rim will not fit the other, and vice versa. Another example is the rim sizes 406 mm and 451 mm, which both traditionally have been referred to as 20 inch (and obviously are not cross-compatible).

ETRTO solves these problems by precisely referring to rim bead diameters in millimeters.

== Bicycle tire sizes ==
The following is a list of different types of bicycle tires listed by bead diameter according to ETRTO:

Rim bead diameter	Traditional names
137	8 x 1 1/4
152	10 x 2
203	12 1/2 x "anything"
252(?)	12 x 1 5/8 French (254 tires may fit if the rim is padded with rim tape)
254	14 x 1.75
288	350a
298	14 x 1 3/8, Moulton Mini
305	16 x 1.75- x 2.125
317	16 x 1 3/4
335	16x 1 3/8 Polish children's bicycles
337	16 x 1 3/8
340	400a
349	16 x 1 3/8
355	18 x 1.5- x 2.125
369	17 x 1 1/4
387	20 x 2.5 (19") Trials & Unicycle
390	450a
400	18 x 1 3/8, 18 x 1
406	20 x 1.5- x 2.125
419	20 x 1 3/4 Schwinn Juven
428	20 x 2 Swedish
438	20 x 1 3/8 NL, Dutch children's bicycles
440	500a
451	20 x 1 1/8; 20 x 1 1/4; 20 x 1 3/8; OS20 x 1.6, 1.75, 1.85
457	22 x 1.75; 22 x 2.1, 22 x 2.125, 22 x 2.3, 22 x 2.4
484	550b
489	22 x 1 1/8 NL, Dutch children's bicycles 22 x 1 3/8 NL
490	550a
501	22 x 1 3/8, British 22 x 1.00
507	24 x 1.5, 24 x 2.125
520	24 x 1, 24 x 1 1/8, 24 x 1 3/8, 24 x 1 3/4
521	24 x 1 3/4 S7
534	24 x 1.5 Dutch
540	24 x 1 1/8, 24 x 1 3/8 (E.5),
541	600 A
547	24 x 1 1/4, 24 x 1 3/8 (S-5)
559	26", traditional size for mountain bikes, but also for fat bikes up to 127 mm tire width
571	26 x 1, 26 x 1 3/4, 650c
583	700d, special size made by GT Bicycles
584	650b, 26 x 1 1/2, 27.5"
590	26 x 1 3/8 (E.A.3), 650a
597	26 x 1 1/4, 26 x 1 3/8 (S-6)
599	26 x 1.25, 26 x 1.375, old American size
609	27 x 1 1/2, rare Danish size
622	700c, 28 x 1 5/8, 28 x 1 1/2 and others, (but see also 635), 28 inch, 29 inch, 28 x 1 1/2 F.13 Canada
630	27 x "anything" (except "27.5" and 609 mm)
635	700b, 28 x 1 1/2, 28 x 1 5/8, 28 x 1 1/2 (old Swedish)
642	700a
686	32 inch
787	36 inch

== See also ==
- ISO 5775 – standard bicycle tyre and rim designations
- Uniform Tire Quality Grading
- Tire bead
- Tubeless tire
- Tubular tire
