= Bicycle wheel =

Wheel designed for a bicycle

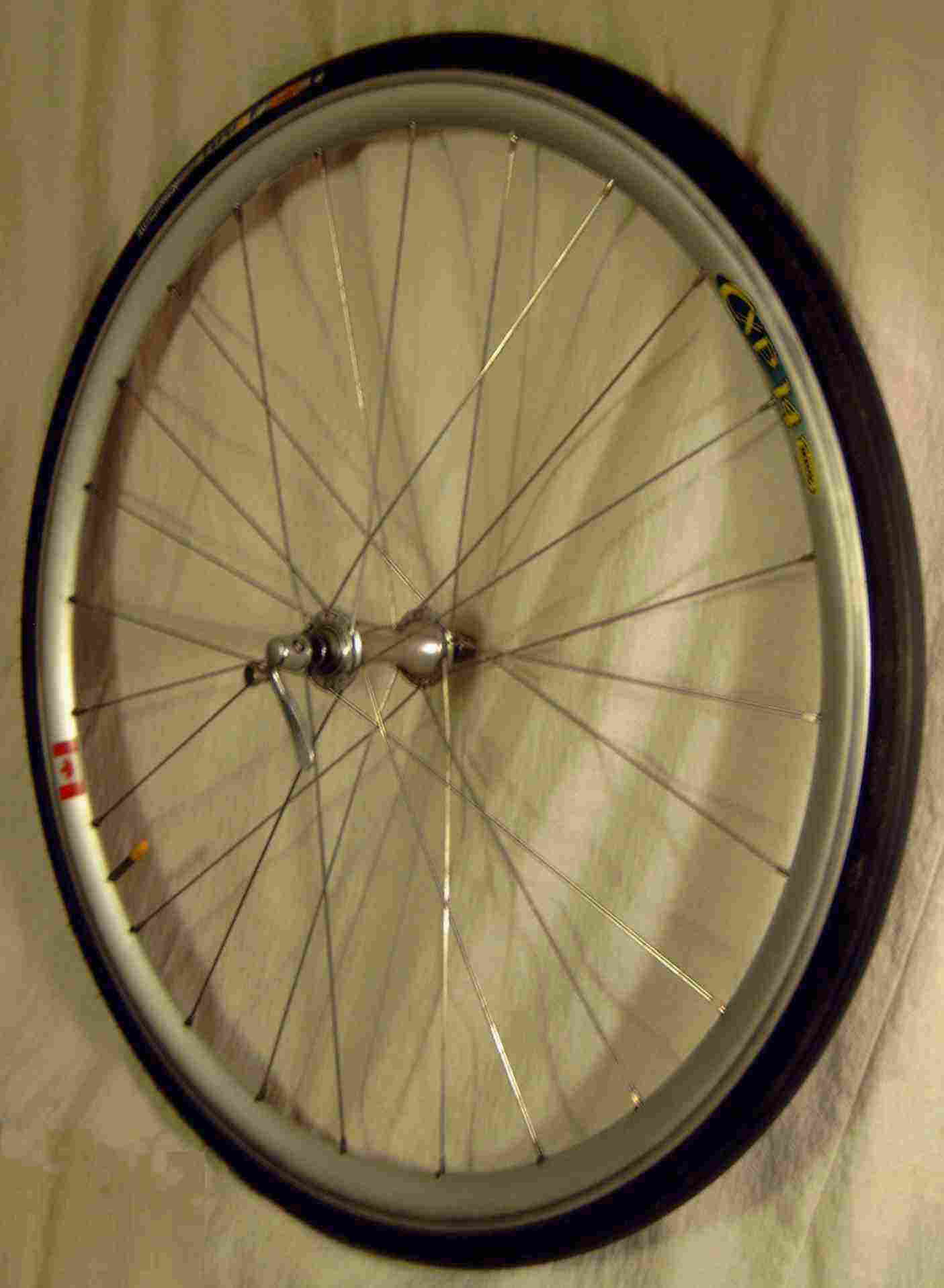
The front wheel from a racing bicycle.

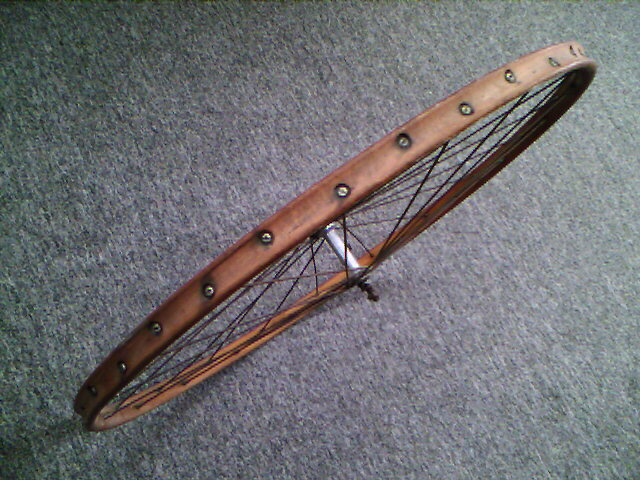
Bicycle wheel with wooden rim

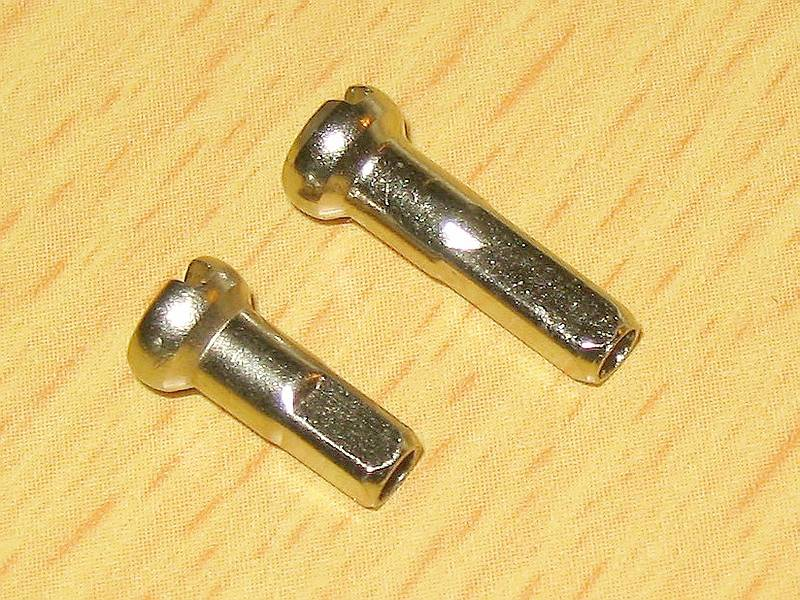
Nipples

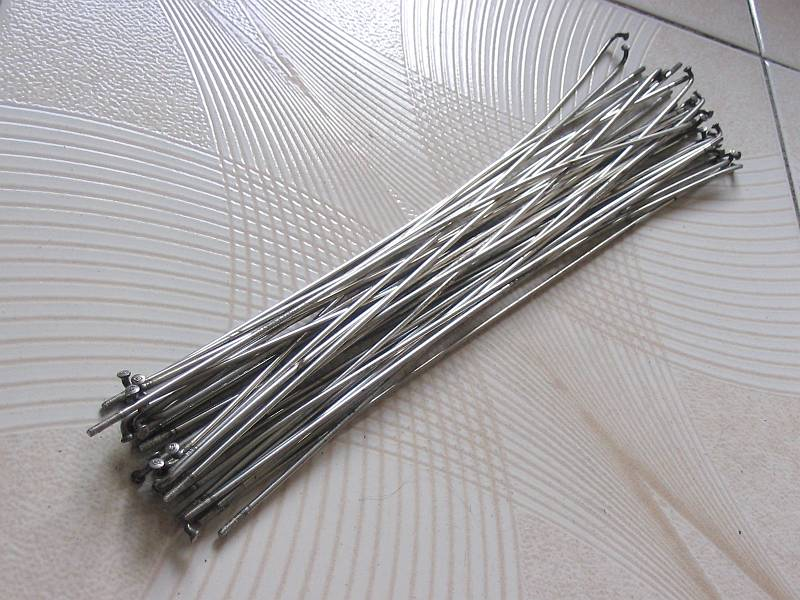
Spokes

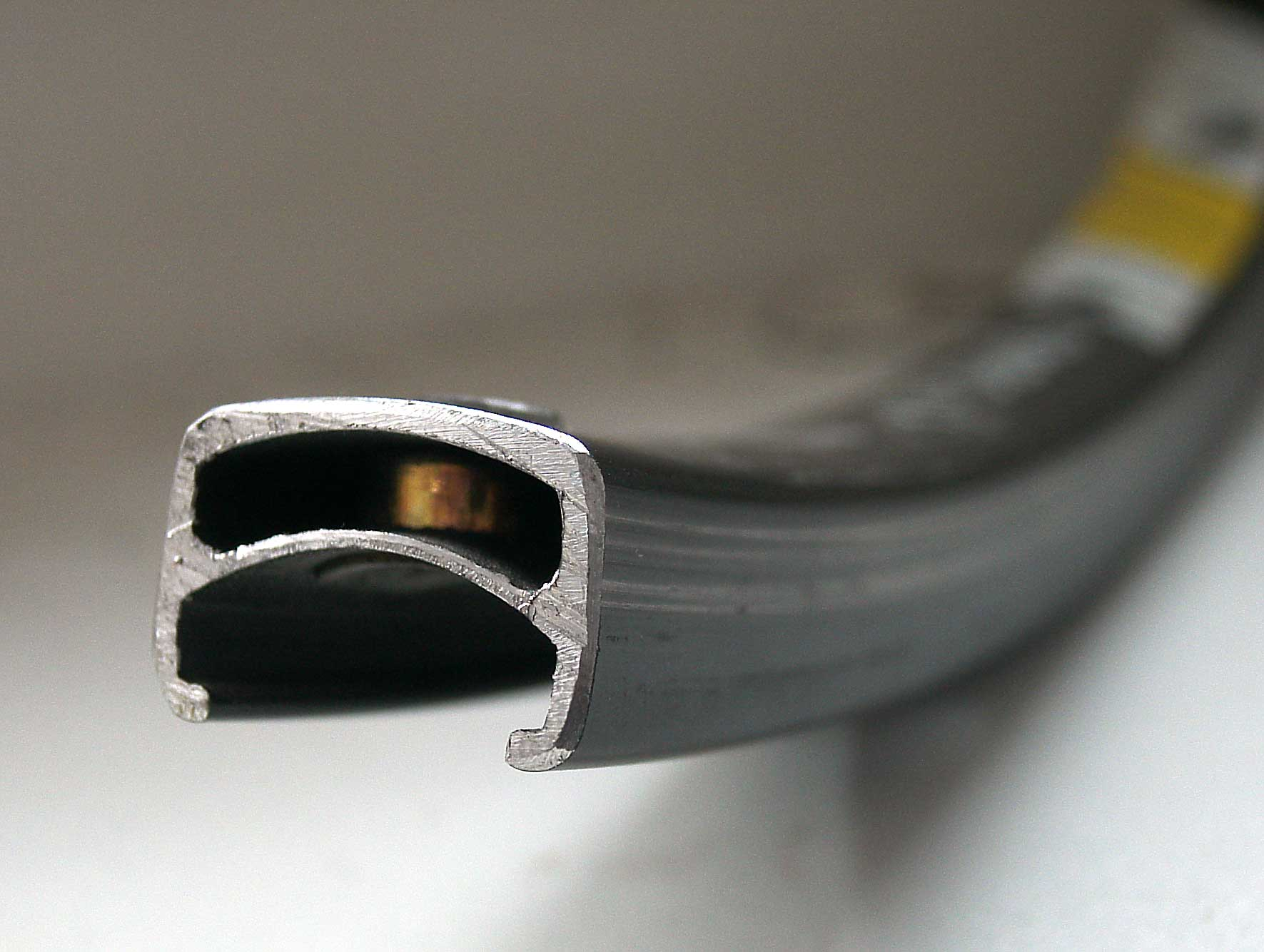
Cross-section of a rim

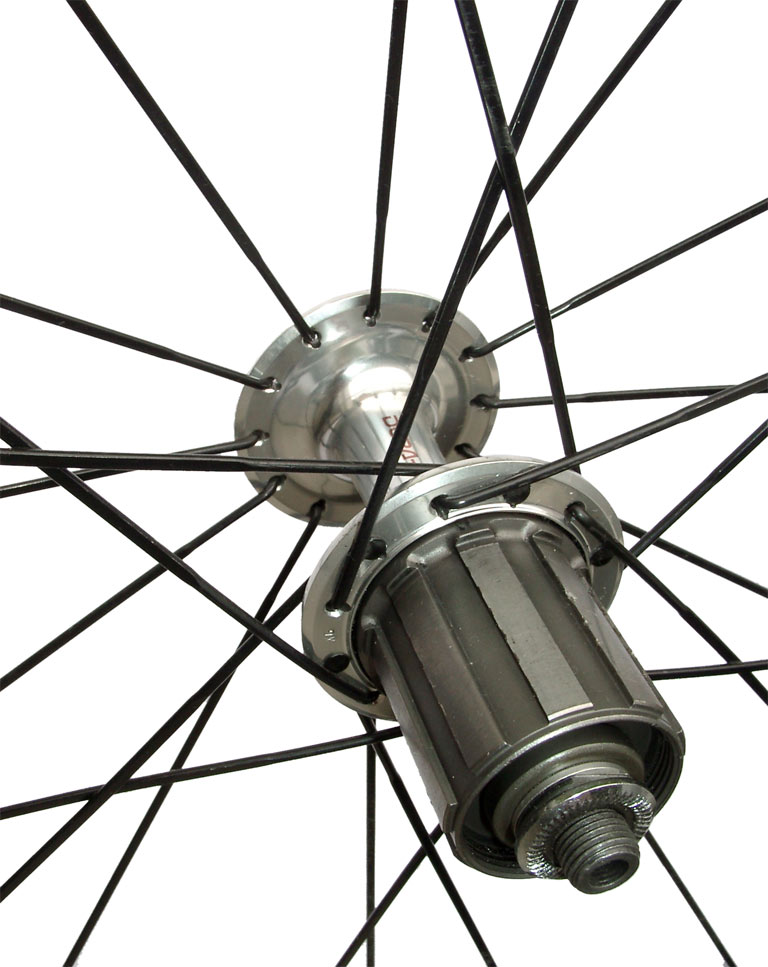
A Shimano Dura-Ace freehub-style hub

A bicycle wheel is a wheel, most commonly a wire wheel, designed for a bicycle. A pair is often called a wheelset, especially in the context of ready built "off the shelf" performance-oriented wheels.

Bicycle wheels are typically designed to fit into the frame and fork via dropouts, and hold bicycle tires. A typical modern wheel has a metal hub, wire tension spokes and a metal or carbon fiber rim. The hub consists of an axle, bearings and a hub shell.

== Invention ==
The first wheel to use the tension in metal spokes was invented by Sir George Cayley to achieve lightness in his 1853 glider.

== Construction ==
The first bicycle wheels followed the traditions of carriage building: a wooden hub, a fixed steel axle (the bearings were located in the fork ends), wooden spokes and a shrink fitted iron tire. A typical modern wheel has a metal hub, wire tension spokes and a metal or carbon fiber rim which holds a pneumatic rubber tire.

=== Hub ===
A hub is the center part of a bicycle wheel. It consists of an axle, bearings and a hub shell. The hub shell typically has two machined metal flanges to which spokes can be attached. Hub shells can be one-piece with press-in cartridge or free bearings or, in the case of older designs, the flanges may be affixed to a separate hub shell.

==== Axle ====
The axle is attached to dropouts on the fork or the frame. The axle can attach using a:

- Quick release skewer - a lever and skewer that pass through a hollow axle designed to allow for installation and removal of the wheel without any tools (found on most modern road bikes and some mountain bikes).
- Nut - the axle is threaded and protrudes past the sides of the fork/frame. (often found on track, fixed gear, single speed, BMX and inexpensive bikes)
- Bolt - the axle has a hole with threads cut into it and a bolt can be screwed into those threads. (found on some single speed hubs, Cannondale Lefty hubs)
- Thru-axle - a removable axle with a threaded end that is inserted through a hole in one fork leg, through the hub, and then screwed into the other fork leg. Some axles have integrated cam levers that compress axle elements against the fork leg to lock it in place, while others rely on pinch bolts on the fork leg to secure it. Diameters for front thru axles include 20 mm, 15 mm, 12 mm, and 9 mm. Rear axles typically have diameters of 10 or 12 mm. Most thru axles are found on mountain bikes, although increasingly disc-braked cyclocross and road bikes are using them. Thru axles repeatably locate the wheel in the fork or frame, which is important to prevent misalignment of brake rotors when using disc brakes. Unlike other axle systems (except Lefty), the thru axle is specific to the fork or frame, not the hub. Hubs/wheels do not include axles, and the axle is generally supplied with the fork or frame. Adapters are usually available to convert wheels suitable for a larger thru axle to a smaller diameter, and to standard 9mm quick releases. This allows a degree of re-use of wheels between frames with different axle specifications.
- Female axle - hollow center axle, typically 14, 15, 17, or 20 mm in diameter made of chromoly and aluminum, with two bolts thread into on either side. This design can be much stronger than traditional axles, which are commonly only 8 mm, 9 mm, 9.5 mm, or 10 mm in diameter. (found on higher end BMX hubs and some mountain bike hubs)

Since the 1980s, bicycles have adopted standard axle spacing: the hubs of front wheels are generally 100 mm wide fork spacing, road wheels with freehubs generally have a 130 mm wide rear wheel hub. Mountain bikes have adopted a 135 mm rear hub width, which allows clearance to mount a brake disc on the hub or to decrease the wheel dish for a more durable wheel. Freeride and downhill are available with both 142 and 150 mm spacing.

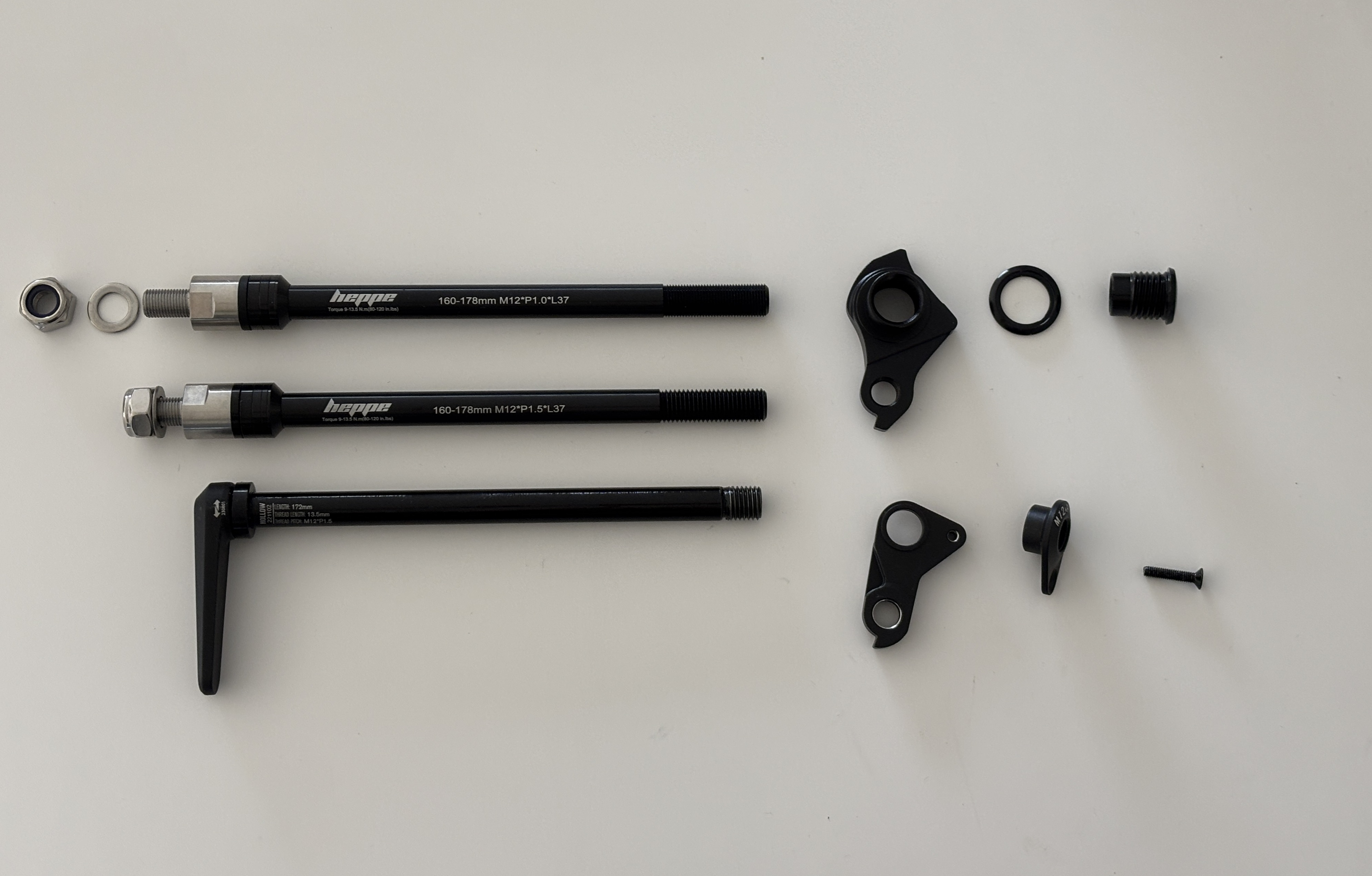
Three M12 through-axles. Top: 1 mm pitch axle for bicycle trailer shown with a universal derailleur hanger (UDH). Bottom: 1.5 mm pitch axle shown with a pre-UDH derailleur hanger

==== Bearings ====
The bearings allow the hub shell (and the rest of the wheel parts) to rotate freely about the axle. Most bicycle hubs use steel or ceramic ball bearings. Some hubs use serviceable "cup and cone" bearings, whereas some use pre-assembled replaceable "cartridge" bearings.

Freehub vs freewheel hub

A "cup and cone" hub contains loose balls that contact an adjustable 'cone' that is screwed onto the axle and a 'race' that is pressed permanently into the hub shell. Both surfaces are smooth to allow the bearings to roll with little friction. This type of hub can be easily disassembled for lubrication, but it must be adjusted correctly; incorrect adjustment can lead to premature wear or failure.

In a "cartridge bearing" hub, the bearings are contained in a cartridge that is shaped like a hollow cylinder where the inner surface rotates with respect to the outer surface by the use of ball bearings. The manufacturing tolerances, as well as seal quality, can be significantly superior to loose ball bearings. The cartridge is pressed into the hub shell and the axle rests against the inner race of the cartridge. The cartridge bearing itself is generally not serviceable or adjustable; instead the entire cartridge bearing is replaced in case of wear or failure.

==== Hub shell and flanges ====
The hub shell is the part of the hub to which the spokes (or disc structure) attach. The hub shell of a spoked wheel generally has two flanges extending radially outward from the axle. Each flange has holes or slots to which spokes are affixed. Some wheels (like the Full Speed Ahead RD-800) have an additional flange in the center of the hub. Others (like some from Bontrager and Zipp) do not have a noticeable flange. The spokes still attach to the edge of the hub but not through visible holes. Other wheels (like those from Velomax/Easton) have a threaded hub shell that the spokes thread into.

On traditionally spoked wheels, flange spacing affects the lateral stiffness of the wheel, with wider being stiffer, and flange diameter affects the torsional stiffness of the wheel and the number of spoke holes that the hub can accept, with larger diameter being stiffer and accepting more holes. Asymmetrical flange diameters, tried to mitigate the adverse effects of asymmetrical spacing and dish necessary on rear wheels with many sprockets, have also been used with modest benefits.

===== Hub brakes =====
Some hubs have attachments for disc brakes or form an integral part of drum brakes.

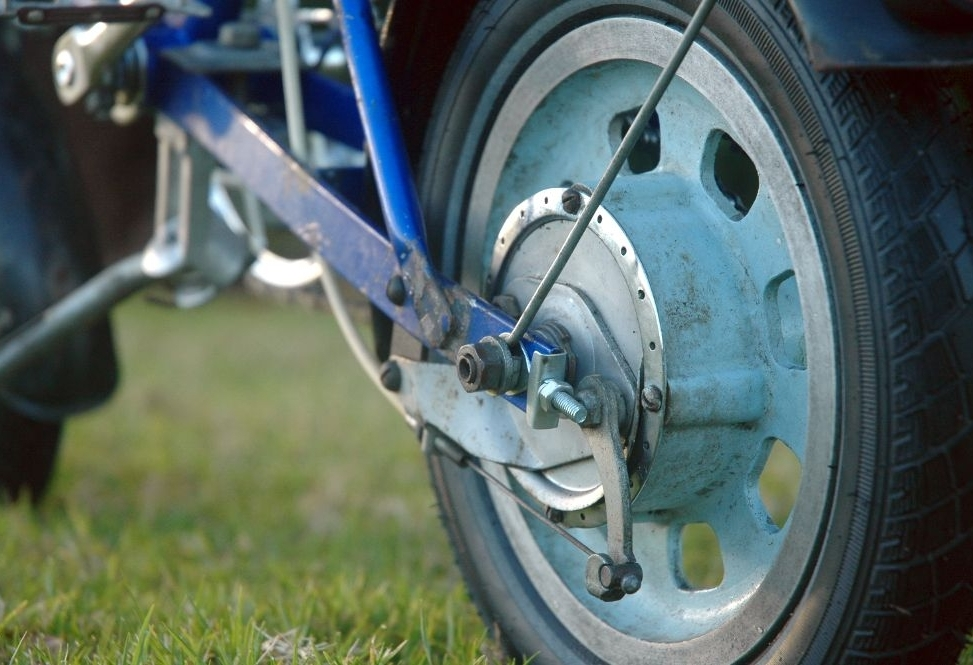
Rear wheel of 1960s Bootie Folding Cycle with Sturmey-Archer drum brake

- Disc brakes – a disc brake comprises a circular plate or disc attached to the hub which is squeezed between brake pads mounted within a caliper that is fixed to one side of the wheel forks. The brake disc can be attached in a variety of ways using bolts or a central locking ring.
- Drum brakes – a drum brake has two brake shoes that expand out into the inside of the hub shell. Rear-mounted drum brakes are often used on tandems to supplement the rear rim brake and give additional stopping power.
- Coaster brake – coaster brakes are a particular type of drum brake which is actuated by a backward pressure applied to the pedals. The mechanism is contained inside the bicycle wheel hub shell.

For information on other types of bicycle brakes see the full article on bicycle brake systems.

===== Gears =====
The rear hub has one or more methods for attaching a gear to it.

- Freehub – The mechanism that allows the rider to coast is built into the hub. Splines on the freehub body allow a single sprocket or, more commonly, a cassette containing several sprockets to be slid on. A lock ring then holds the cog(s) in place. This is the case for most modern bicycles.
- Freewheel – The mechanism that allows the rider to coast is not part of the hub, it is contained in a separate freewheel body. The hub has threads that allow the freewheel body to be screwed on, and the freewheel body has threads or splines for fitting sprockets, or in the case of most single speed freewheels an integral sprocket. This style of hub was used before the freehub became practical.
- Track sprocket – There is no mechanism that allows the rider to coast. There are two sets of threads on the hub shell. The threads are in opposite directions. The inner (clockwise) set of threads is for a track sprocket and the outer (counter-clockwise) set is for a reverse threaded lock ring. The reverse threads on the lock ring keep the sprocket from unscrewing from the hub, which is otherwise possible when slowing down.
- Flip-flop hub – Both sides of the hub are threaded, allowing the wheel to be removed and reversed in order to change which gear is used. Depending on the style of threads, may be used with either a single-speed freewheel or a track sprocket.
- Internal geared hub – the mechanism to provide multiple gear-ratios is contained inside the shell of the hub. Many bicycles with three-speed internally geared hubs were built in the last century.

=== Rim ===
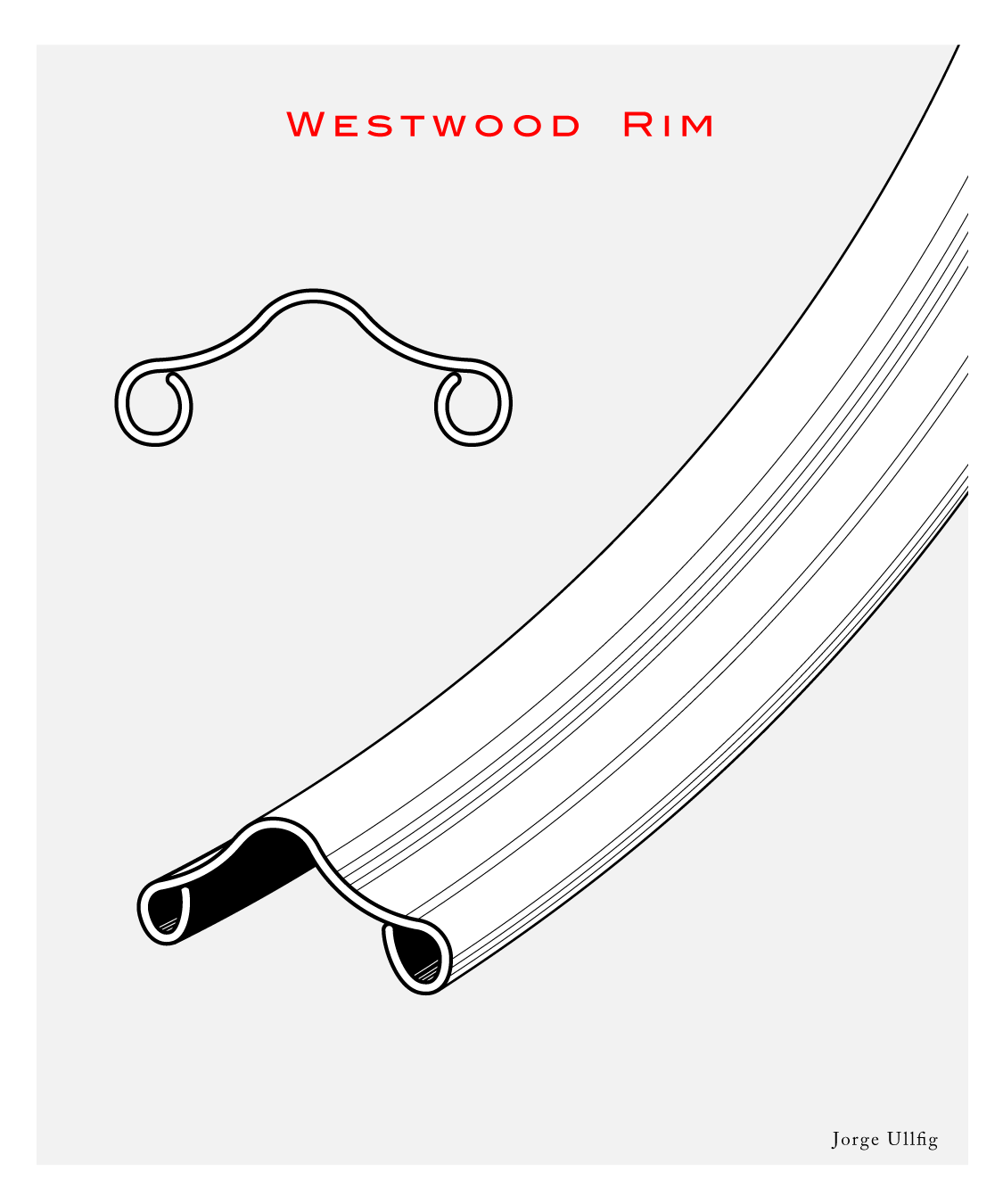
Westwood rim as fitted to vintage roadster bicycles with rod/ stirrup brakes, today being used in contemporary "drum brake" traditional utility bicycles

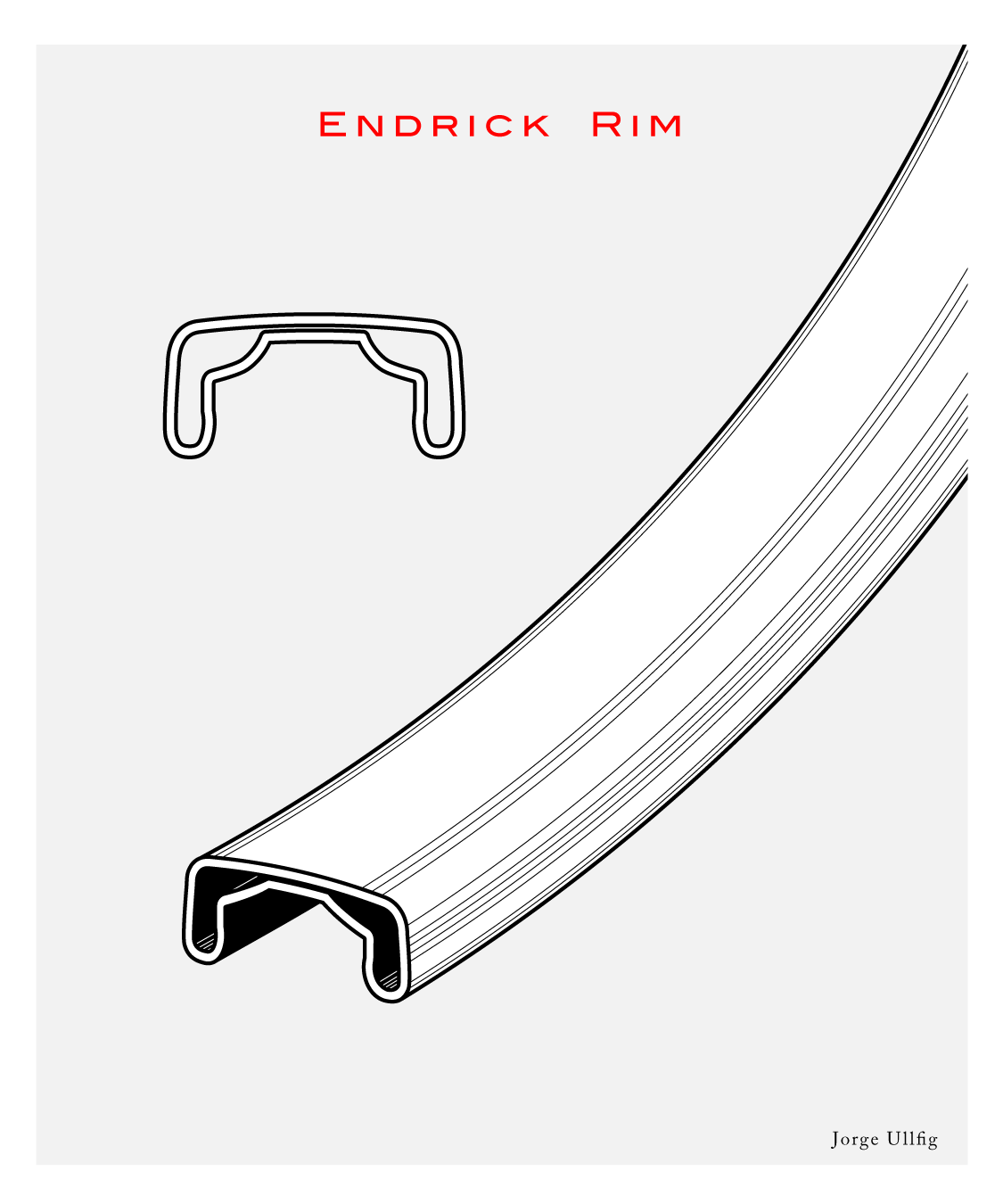
Endrick Rim as fitted to sports bicycles from the 1930s, 40s and 50s, forerunner of modern-day rim brakes

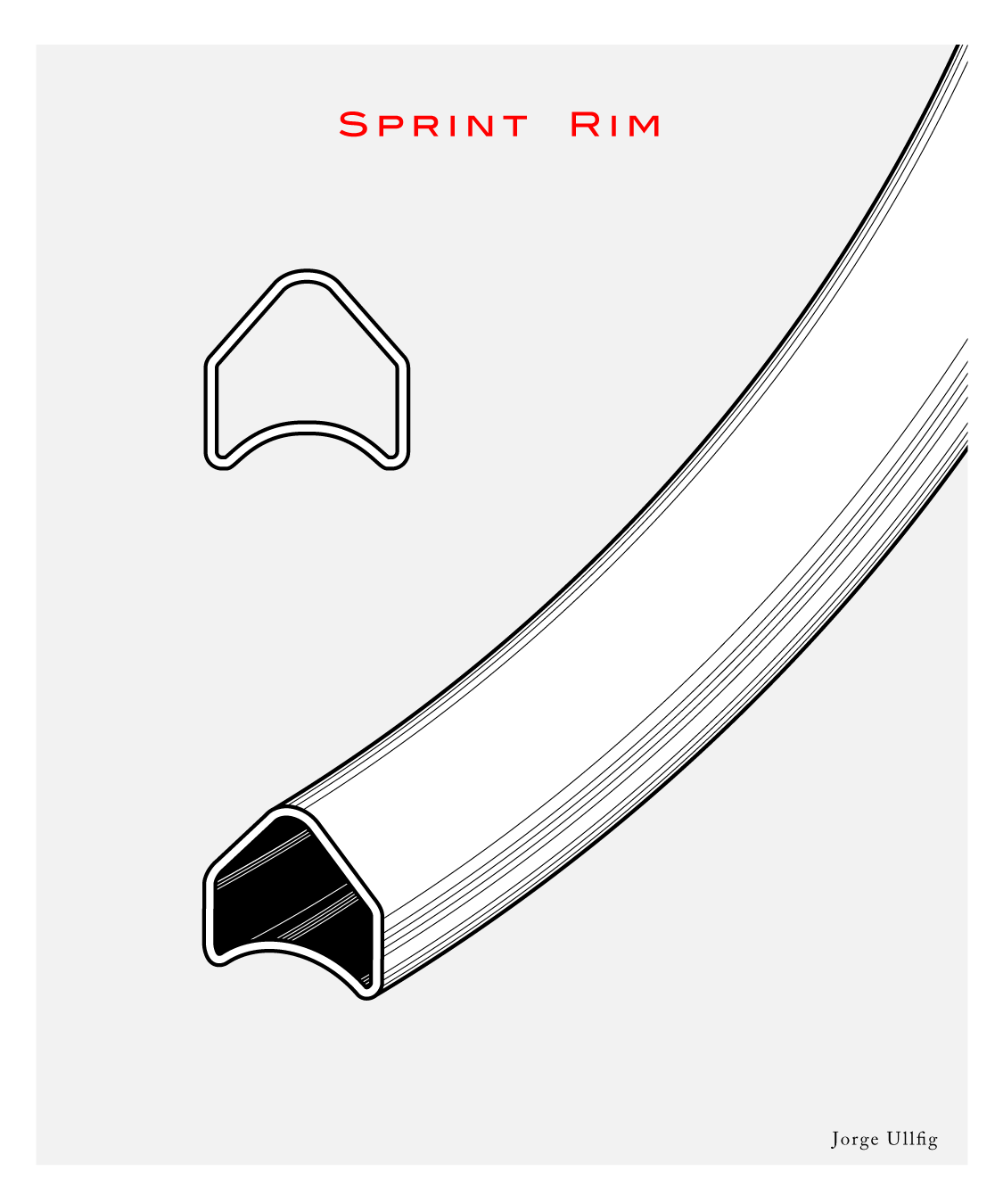
Rims for tubular tires, referred to as "sprint rims" in Britain and Ireland.

The rim is commonly a metal extrusion that is butted into itself to form a hoop, though may also be a structure of carbon fiber composite, and was historically made of wood. Some wheels use both an aerodynamic carbon hoop bonded to an aluminum rim on which to mount conventional bicycle tires.

Metallic bicycle rims are now normally made of aluminium alloy, although until the 1980s most bicycle rims - with the exception of those used on racing bicycles - were made of steel and thermoplastic.

Rims designed for use with rim brakes provide a smooth parallel braking surface, while rims meant for use with disc brakes or hub brakes sometimes lack this surface.

The Westwood pattern rim was one of the first rim designs, and rod-actuated brakes, which press against the inside surface of the rim were designed for this rim. These rims cannot be used with caliper rim brakes.

The cross-section of a rim can have a wide range of geometry, each optimized for particular performance goals. Aerodynamics, mass and inertia, stiffness, durability, tubeless tire compatibility, brake compatibility, and cost are all considerations. If the part of the cross-section of the rim is hollow where the spokes attached, as in the Sprint rim pictured, it is described as box-section or double-wall to distinguish it from single-wall rims such as the Westwood rim pictured. The double wall can make the rim stiffer. Triple-wall rims have additional reinforcement inside the box-section.

Aluminum rims are often reinforced with either single eyelets or double eyelets to distribute the stress of the spoke. A single eyelet reinforces the spoke hole much like a hollow rivet. A double eyelet is a cup that is riveted into both walls of a double-walled rim.

Bicycle rims utilizing inner tubes also require rim tapes or strips, a flexible but tough liner (usually rubber or woven nylon or similar material) attached to the inner circumference of the wheel to cover the ends of the nipples. Otherwise, the nipple ends wear a hole in the tube causing a flat tire.

==== Clincher rims ====
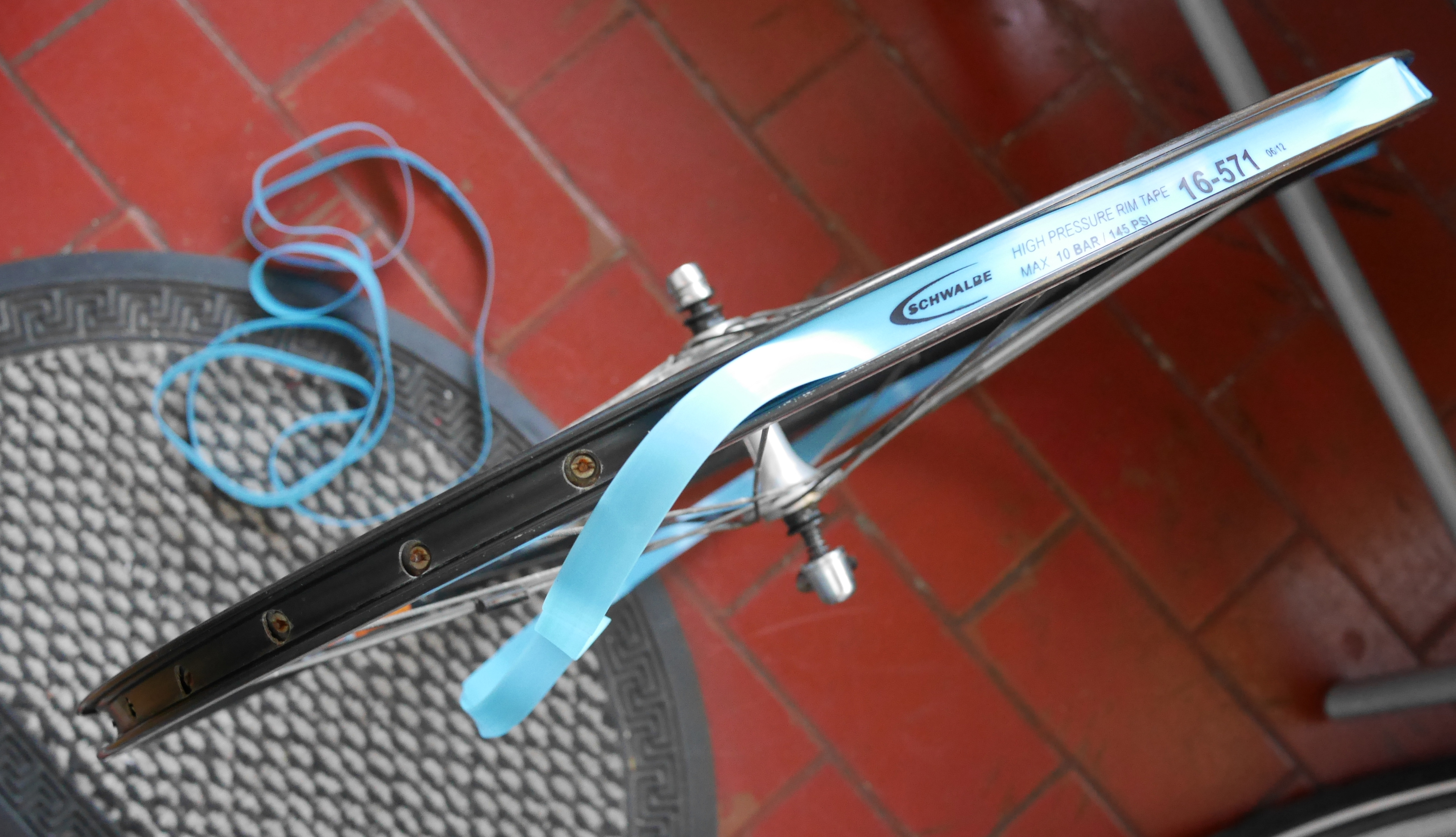
Fitting rim tape around 26 inch wheel (MTB). Rim tape protects the bicycle wheel's inner tube from spoke holes, which will puncture the tube if exposed inside the rim.

Most bicycle rims are "clincher" rims for use with clincher tires. These tires have a wire or aramid (Kevlar or Twaron) fiber bead that interlocks with flanges in the rim. A separate airtight inner tube enclosed by the rim supports the tire carcass and maintains the bead lock. If the inner part of the rim where the inner tube fits has spoke holes, they must be covered by a rim tape or strip, usually rubber, cloth, or tough plastic, to protect the inner tube.

An advantage of this system is that the inner tube can be easily accessed in the case of a leak to be patched or replaced.

The ISO 5775-2 standard defines designations for bicycle rims. It distinguishes between

1. Straight-side (SS) rims
2. Crochet-type (C) rims
3. Hooked-bead (HB) rims

Traditional clincher rims were straight-sided. Various "hook" (also called "crochet") designs emerged in the 1970s to hold the bead of the tire in place, allowing high (6–10 bar, 80–150 psi) air pressure.

==== Tubular or sew-up rims ====
Some rims are designed for tubular tires which are torus shaped and attached to the rim with adhesive. The rim provides a shallow circular outer cross section in which the tire lies instead of flanges on which tire beads seat.

==== Tubeless ====
A tubeless tire system requires an airtight rim — capable of being sealed at the valve stem, spoke holes (if they go all the way through the rim) and the tire bead seat — and a compatible tire. Universal System Tubeless (UST), originally developed by Mavic, Michelin and Hutchinson for mountain bikes is the most common system of tubeless tires/rims for bicycles. The main benefit of tubeless tires is the ability to use low air pressure for better traction without getting pinch flats because there is no tube to pinch between the rim and an obstacle.

Some cyclists have avoided the price premium for a tubeless system by sealing the spoke holes with a special rim strip or tape and then sealing the valve stem and bead seat with a latex sealer. However, tires not designed for the tubeless application do not have as robust a sidewall as those that are.

The drawbacks to tubeless tires are that they are notorious for being harder to mount on the rim than clincher tires, and that the cyclist must still carry a spare tube to insert in case of a flat tire due to a puncture.

French tire manufacturer Hutchinson has introduced a tubeless wheel system, Road Tubeless, that shares many similarities to the UST (Universal System Tubeless) that was developed in conjunction with Mavic and Michelin. Road Tubeless rims, like UST rims, have no spoke holes protruding to the air chamber of the rim. The flange of the Road Tubeless rim is similar to the hook bead of a standard clincher rim but is contoured to very close tolerances to interlock with a Road Tubeless tire, creating an airtight seal between tire and rim. This system eliminates the need for a rim strip and inner tube.

In 2006, Shimano and Hutchinson introduced a tubeless system for road bikes.

=== Spokes ===
Directions to turn spoke nipples to true a wheel

The rim is connected to the hub by a number of spokes, which are rods. While early bicycle wheels used wooden spokes that could be loaded only in compression, modern bicycle wheels almost exclusively use spokes that can only be loaded in tension.

The rear wheel is subjected to greater stress because more weight is carried on the rear wheel. The rear wheel spokes on the right are more likely to fail. The rear wheels are asymmetrical to make room for multisprocket gear clusters. This asymmetry means that the spokes on the right are twice as tight as those on the left. The spokes break due to fatigue and not excessive force.

One end of each spoke is threaded for a specialized nut, called a nipple, which is used to connect the spoke to the rim and adjust the tension in the spoke. This is normally at the rim end. The hub end normally has a 90-degree bend to pass through the spoke hole in the hub, and a head so it does not slip through the hole. This is the J-bend type. Another type is straight pull spokes, which have no bend at the hub end, just a head. The major materials for spoke nipples are aluminum and brass.

Double-butted spokes have reduced thickness over the center section and are lighter, more elastic, and more aerodynamic than spokes of uniform thickness. Single-butted spokes are thicker at the hub and then taper to a thinner section all the way to the threads at the rim. Triple-butted spokes also exist and are thickest at the hub, thinner at the threaded end, and thinnest in the middle.

==== Cross section ====
Spokes are usually circular in cross-section, but high-performance wheels may use spokes of flat or oval cross-section, also known as bladed, to reduce aerodynamic drag. Some spokes are hollow tubes.

==== Material ====
The spokes on the vast majority of modern bicycle wheels are steel or stainless steel. Stainless steel spokes are favored by most manufacturers and riders for their durability, stiffness, damage tolerance, and ease of maintenance. Non-stainless steel spokes on older or cheaper bikes are sometimes surface-treated by galvanization, paint, or, more rarely, chrome plating, and can rust eventually. Spokes are also available in titanium, aluminum, carbon fiber, and non-rigid materials such as polyethylene composites.

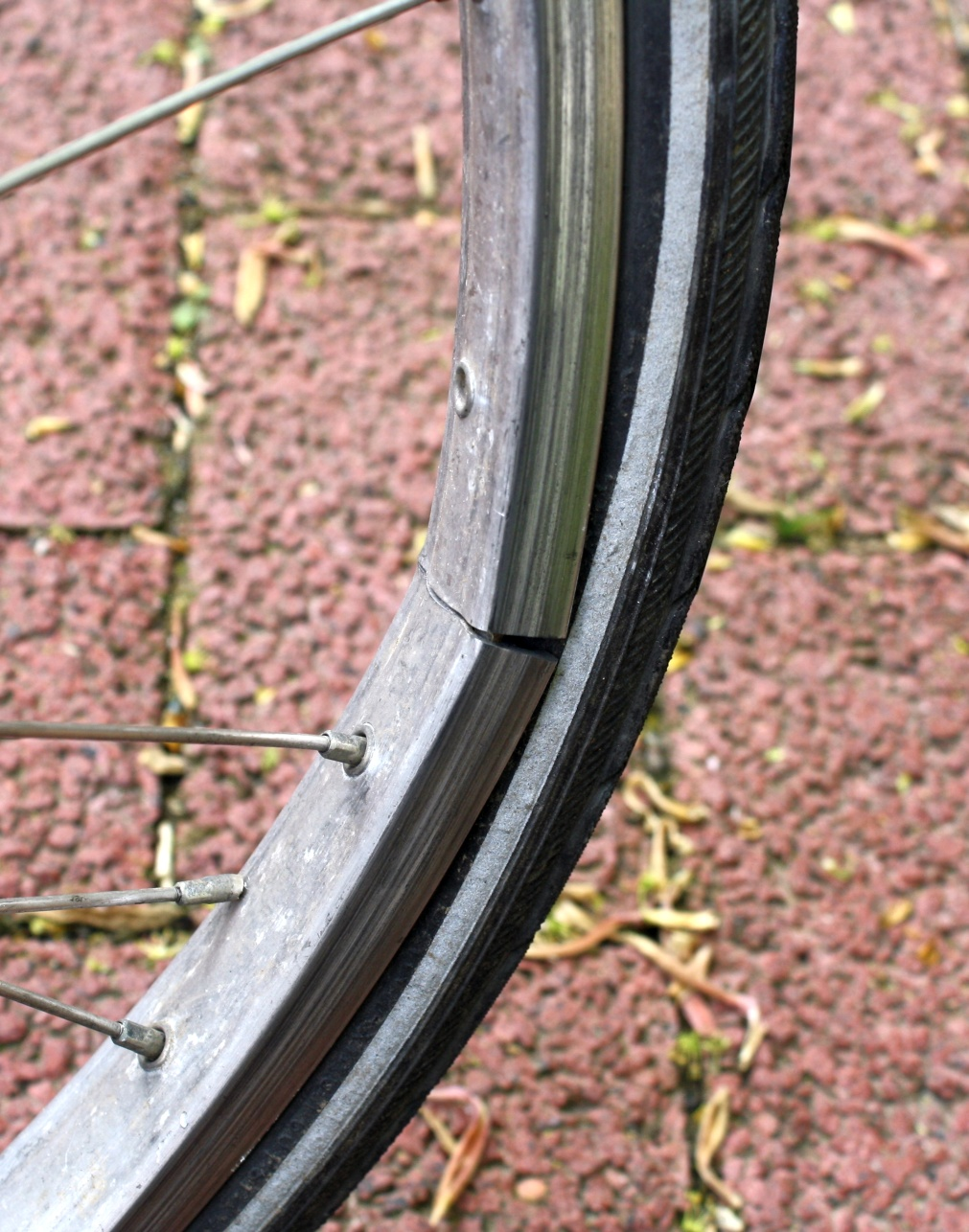
Broken rim after a bicycle/car-door collision

==== Number of spokes ====
Conventional metallic bicycle wheels have 24, 28, 32 or 36 spokes. Wheels on tandems and BMX often have 40 or 48 spokes to support additional stresses and weight. Lowrider bicycles may have as many as 144 spokes per wheel.

Wheels with fewer spokes have an aerodynamic advantage, as the drag is reduced. The reduced number of spokes also results in a larger section of the rim being unsupported, necessitating stronger and often heavier rims. Some wheel designs also locate the spokes unequally into the rim, which requires a stiff rim hoop and correct tension of the spokes. Conventional wheels with spokes distributed evenly across the circumference of the rim are considered more durable and forgiving to poor maintenance. The more general trend in wheel design suggests technological advancement in rim materials may result in further reduction in the number of spokes per wheel.

==== Lacing ====
Lacing is the process of threading spokes through holes in the hub and rim so that they form a spoke pattern. While most manufacturers use the same lacing pattern on both left and right sides of a wheel, it is becoming increasingly common to find specialty wheels with different lacing patterns on each side. A spoke can connect the hub to the rim in a radial fashion, which creates the lightest and most aerodynamic wheel. However, to efficiently transfer torque from the hub to the rim, as with driven wheels or wheels with drum or disc brakes, durability dictates that spokes be mounted at an angle to the hub flange up to a "tangential lacing pattern" to achieve maximum torque capability (but minimum vertical wheel stiffness). Names for various lacing patterns are commonly referenced to the number of spokes that any one spoke crosses.

Conventionally laced 36- or 32-spoke wheels are most commonly built as a cross-3 or a cross-2, however other cross-numbers are also possible. The angle at which the spoke interfaces the hub is not solely determined by the cross-number; as spoke count and hub diameter will lead to significantly different spoke angles. For all common tension-spoke wheels with crossed spokes, a torque applied to the hub will result in one half of the spokes - called "leading spokes" tensioned to drive the rim, while other half - "trailing spokes" are tensioned only to counteract the leading spokes. When forward torque is applied (i.e., during acceleration ), the trailing spokes experience a higher tension, while leading spokes are relieved, thus forcing the rim to rotate. While braking, leading spokes tighten and trailing spokes are relieved. The wheel can thus transfer the hub torque in either direction with the least amount of change in spoke tension, allowing the wheel to stay true while torque is applied.

Wheels that are not required to transfer any significant amount of torque from the hub to the rim are often laced radially. Here, the spokes leave the hub at perpendicular to the axle and go straight to the rim, without crossing any other spokes - e.g., "cross-0". This lacing pattern can not transfer torque as efficiently as tangential lacing. Thus it is generally preferred to build a crossed-spoke wheel where torque forces, whether driving or braking, issue from the hub. Where braking is concerned, the older-style caliper devices that contact the rims to apply braking force are not affected by lacing patterns in this way because braking forces are transferred from the calipers directly to the rim, then to the tires and then to the roadway. Disc brakes, however, transfer their force to the roadway via the spokes from the disc's mounting point on the hub and are therefore affected by the lacing pattern in a manner similar to that of the drive system.

Hubs that have previously been laced in any other pattern should not be used for radial lacing, as the pits and dents created by the spokes can be the weak points along which the hub flange may break. This is not always the case: for example if the hub used has harder, steel flanges like those on a vintage bicycle.

Wheel builders also employ other exotic spoke lacing patterns (such as "crow's foot", which is essentially a mix of radial and tangential lacing) as well as innovative hub geometries. Most of these designs take advantage of new high-strength materials or manufacturing methods to improve wheel performance. As with any structure, however, practical usefulness is not always agreed, and often nonstandard wheel designs may be opted for solely aesthetic reasons.

==== Adjustment ("truing") ====
There are three aspects of wheel geometry which must be brought into adjustment in order to true a wheel. "Lateral truing" refers to elimination of local deviations of the rim to the left or right of center. "Vertical truing" refers to adjustments of local deviations (known as hop) of the radius, the distance from the rim to the center of the hub. "Dish" refers to the left-right centering of the plane of the rim between the lock nuts on the outside ends of the axle. This plane is itself determined as an average of local deviations in the lateral truing. For most rim-brake bicycles, the dish will be symmetrical on the front wheel. However, on the rear wheel, because most bicycles accommodate a rear sprocket (or group of them), the dishing will often be asymmetrical: it will be dished at a deeper angle on the non-drive side than on the drive side.

In addition to the three geometrical aspects of truing, the overall tension of the spokes is significant to the wheel's fatigue durability, stiffness, and ability to absorb shock. Too little tension leads to a rim that is easily deformed by impact with rough terrain. Too much tension can deform the rim, making it impossible to true, and can decrease spoke life. Spoke tensiometers are tools which measure the tension in a spoke. Another common method for making rough estimates of spoke tension involves plucking the spokes and listening to the audible tone of the vibrating spoke. The optimum tension depends on the spoke length and spoke gauge (diameter). Tables are available online which list tensions for each spoke length, either in terms of absolute physical tension, or notes on the musical scale which coincide with the approximate tension to which the spoke should be tuned. In the real world, a properly trued wheel will not, in general, have a uniform tension across all spokes, due to variation among the parts from which the wheel is made.

Finally, for best, long-lasting results, spoke wind-up should be minimized. When a nipple turns, it twists the spoke at first, until there is enough torsional stress in the spoke to overcome the friction in the threads between the spoke and the nipple. This is easiest to see with bladed or ovalized spokes, but occurs in round spokes as well. If a wheel is ridden with this torsional stress left in the spokes, they may untwist and cause the wheel to become out of true. Bladed and ovalized spokes may be held straight with an appropriate tool as the nipple is turned. The common practice for minimizing wind-up in round spokes is to turn the nipple past the desired orientation by about a quarter turn, and then turn it back that quarter turn.

In wheel truing, all these factors must be incrementally brought into balance against each other. A commonly recommended practice is to find the worst spot on the wheel, and bring it slightly more into true before moving on to the next worst spot on the wheel.

"Truing stands" are mechanical devices for mounting wheels and truing them. It is also possible to true a wheel while it is mounted on the bike: brake pads or some other fixed point may be used as a reference mark, however this is less accurate.

=== Nipples ===
At one end of each spoke is a specialized nut, called a nipple, which is used to connect the spoke to the rim and adjust the tension in the spoke. The nipple is usually located at the rim end of the spoke but on some wheels it is at the hub end in order to move its weight closer to the axis of the wheel, reducing the moment of inertia. A variant of this is integrating nipples into the hub, its flange containing the threads for usually bladed spokes.

The most common materials used for bicycle nipples are brass and aluminum (often referred to as "alloy"). Brass nipples are heavier than aluminum, but they are more durable. Aluminum nipples save weight, but they are less durable than brass and more likely to corrode.

A nipple at the rim of a wheel usually protrudes from the rim towards the center of the wheel, but in racing wheels may be internal to the rim, offering a slight aerodynamic advantage.

=== Alternatives ===
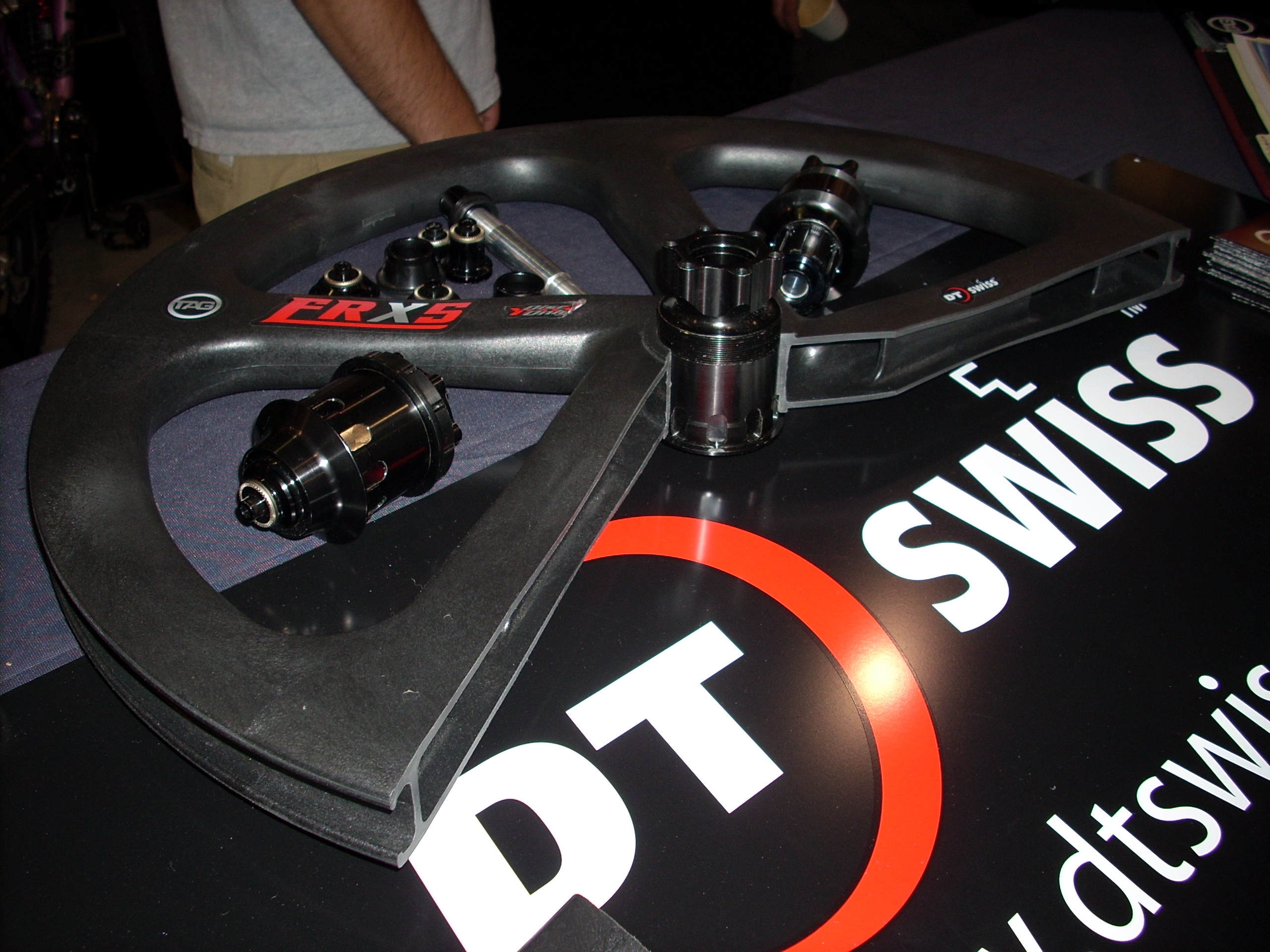
A sectioned, carbon–composite, rear wheel for mountain bikes.

A wheel can be formed in one piece from a material such as thermoplastic (glass-filled nylon in this case), carbon fiber or aluminium alloy. Thermoplastic is commonly used for inexpensive BMX wheels. They have a low maximum tire pressure of 45 psi (3bars or atmospheres). Carbon fiber is typically used for high-end aerodynamic racing wheels.

=== Disc wheels ===
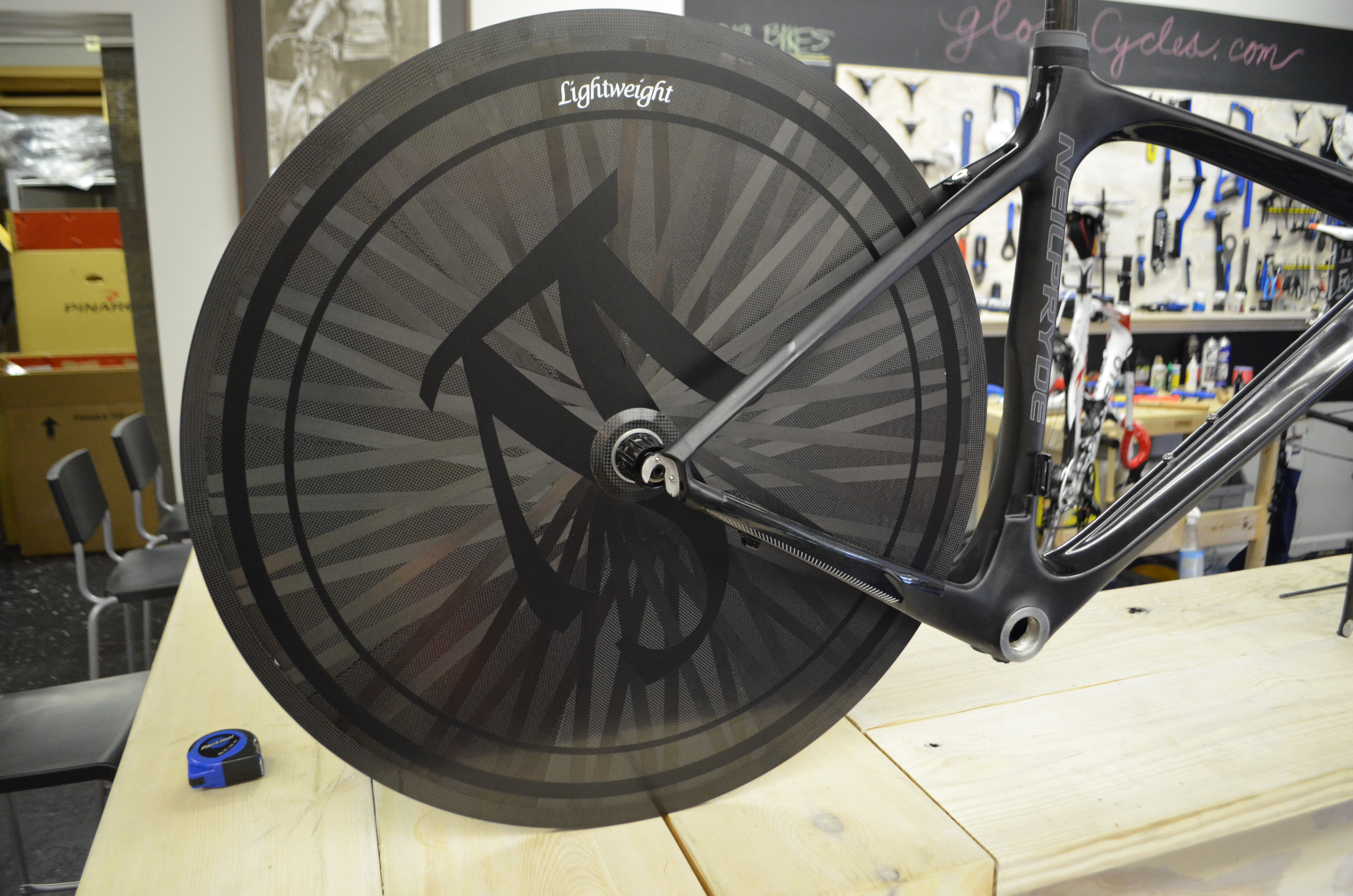
Carbon fiber disc wheel.

Disc wheels are designed to minimize aerodynamic drag. A full disc is usually heavier than traditional spoke wheels, and can be difficult to handle when ridden with a cross wind. For this reason, international cycling organizations often ban disc wheels or limit their use to the rear wheel of a bicycle. However, international triathlon federations were (and are still) less restrictive and this is what led to the wheels' initial usage growth in popularity in the 1980s.

A disc wheel may simply be a fairing that clips onto a traditional, spoke wheel, addressing the drag that the spokes generate by covering them; or the disc can be integral to the wheel with no spokes inside. In the latter case, carbon fiber is the material of choice. A spoke wheel with a disc cover may not be legal under UCI (Union Cycliste Internationale) rules because it is a non-structural fairing while it may be legal under ITU (International Triathlon Union) rules.

A compromise that reduces weight and improves cross wind performance has a small number (three or four) tension-compression spokes molded integral to the rim – also typically carbon fiber.

== Types ==
Bicycle wheels can be categorized by their primary use.

=== Road/racing bicycle wheels ===
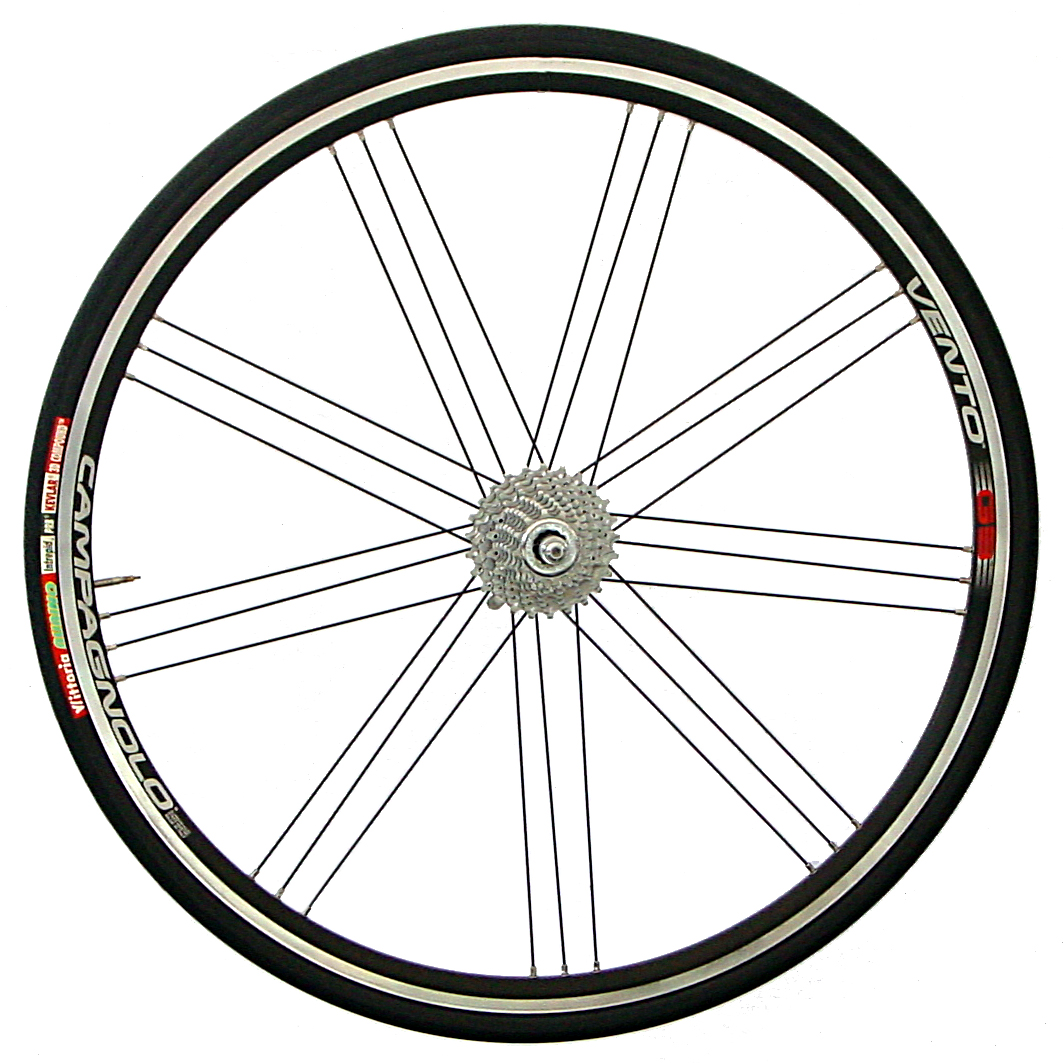
A Campagnolo rear wheel with "G3" triplet spoke lacing. There are 18 tangential spokes on the right side, but only 9 radial on the left. Picture also shows a 10-speed cassette

For road bicycle racing performance there are several factors which are generally considered the most important:

- aerodynamics
- weight
- rotational inertia
- hub/bearing smoothness
- stiffness

Semi-aerodynamic and aerodynamic wheelsets are now commonplace for road bicycles. Aluminum rims are still the most common, but carbon fiber is also becoming popular. Carbon fiber is also finding use in hub shells to reduce weight; however, because of the hub's proximity to the center of rotation reducing the hub's weight has less effect to the rotational inertia than reducing the rim's weight.

Semi-aerodynamic and aerodynamic wheelsets are characterized by greater rim depth, which is the radial distance between the outermost and the innermost surfaces of the rim; a triangular or pyramidal cross-section; and by fewer numbers of spokes, or no spokes at all—with blades molded of composite material supporting the rim. The spokes are also often flattened in the rotational direction to reduce wind drag. These are called bladed spokes. However, semi-aerodynamic and aerodynamic wheelsets tend to be heavier than more traditional spoked wheelsets due to the extra shapings of the rims and spokes. More importantly, the rims must be heavier when there are fewer spokes, as the unsupported span between spokes is greater. A number of wheel manufacturers are now producing wheels with roughly half the spokes of the highest performance traditional wheel from the 1980s, with approximately the same rotational inertia and less total weight. These improvements have been made possible primarily through improved aluminum alloys for the rims.

Most clincher carbon fiber wheelsets, such as those made by Zipp and Mavic, still use aluminum parts at the clinching part of the rim. An increased number of all-carbon rims, such as Campagnolo Hyperon Ultra Clincher, Viva v8 wheels, Bontrager's Carbon Clincher wheels, DT Swiss RRC1250, Corima Winium and Aero (also tubeless, see below) and Lightweight Standard C wheelsets are now available.

==== 700C road bicycle wheels / ISO 622 mm ====
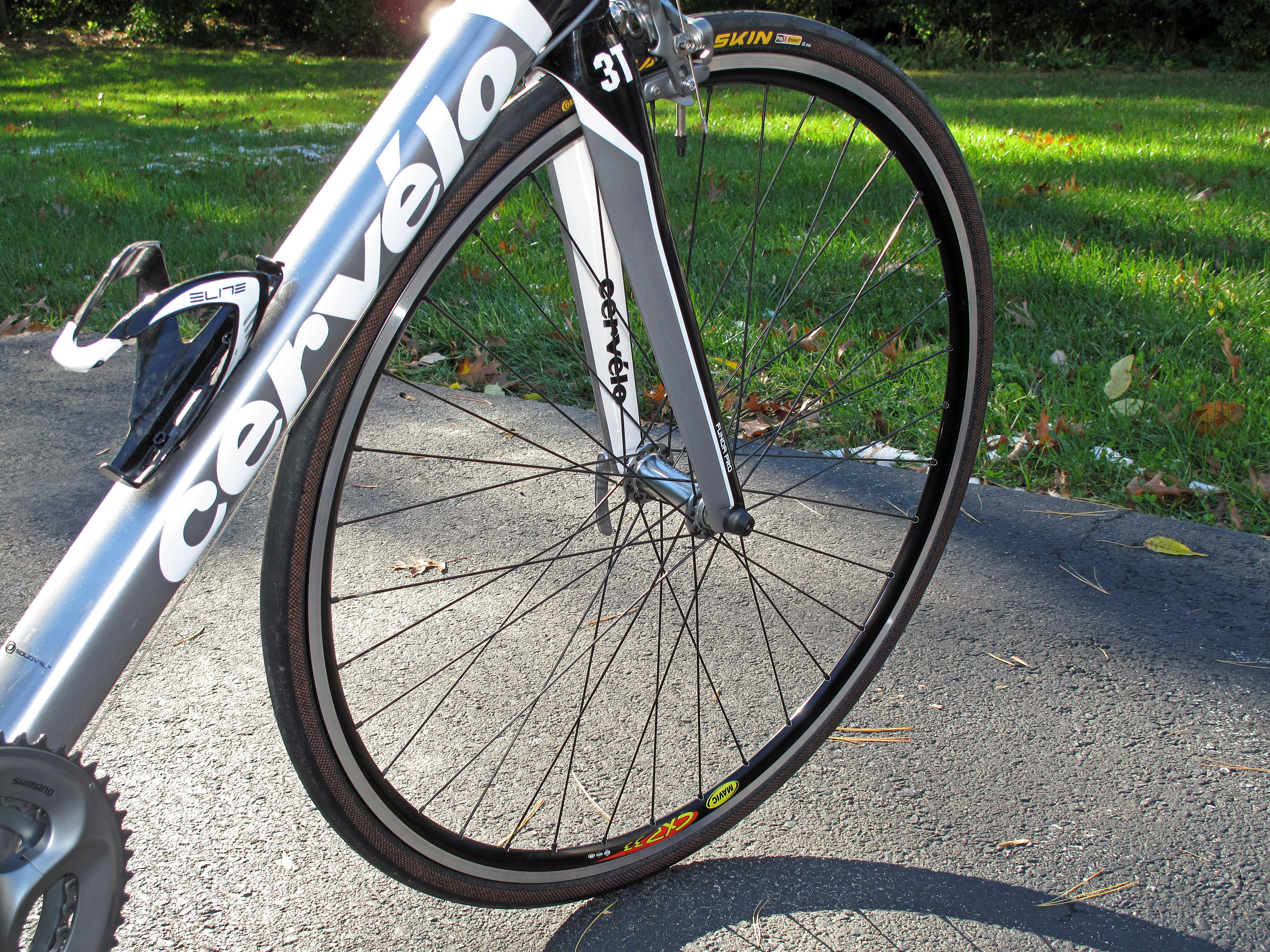
700C front wheel

Plastic BMX wheel (mag)

Touring, race, and cyclo-cross bicycles may have vastly different design goals for their wheels. Aerodynamic performance and low weight are beneficial for road bicycles, while for cyclo-cross strength gains importance, and for touring bicycles, strength becomes more important again. However, this diameter of rim, identical in diameter to the "29er" rim, is by far the most common on these styles of bicycles. Road wheels may be designed for tubular or clincher tires, commonly referred to as "700C" tires.

==== 650C triathlon bicycle wheels / ISO 571 mm ====
These wheels experienced a brief popularity in the 1990s on triathlon bikes.

==== 650B gravel bicycle wheels / ISO 584 mm ====
In the late 2010s, 650B wheels began appearing on gravel bikes.

=== Mountain bike wheels ===
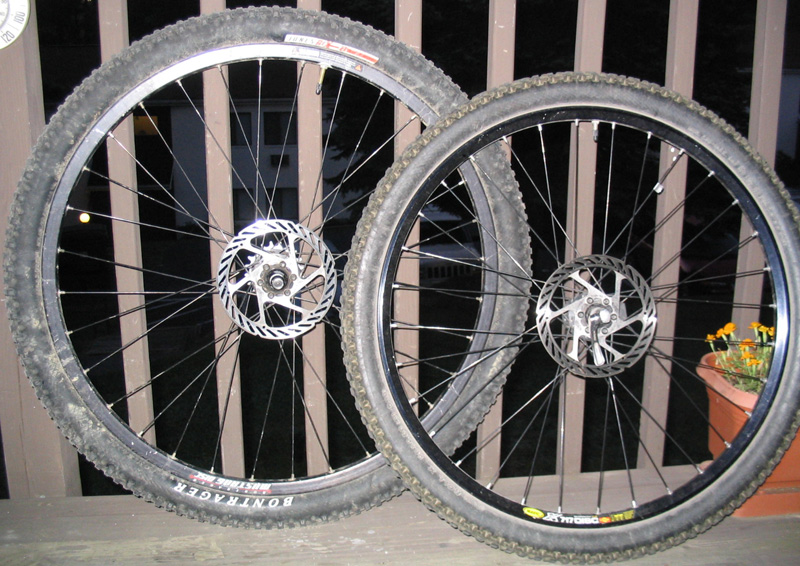
A 29″ and 26″ mountain bike wheel

Mountain bike wheels are described by the approximate outer diameter of the rim plus a wide, ~2+ inch tire.

==== 24 inch / ISO 507 mm ====
24-inch clincher tires (with inner tubes) are the most common wheel size for junior mountain bikes. The typical 24-inch rim has a diameter of 507 millimetres (20.0 in) and an outside tire diameter of about 24 inches (610 mm).

==== 26 inch / ISO 559 mm ====
26-inch clincher tires (with inner tubes) were the most common wheel size for new mountain bikes until the early 2010s. This tradition was started initially because the early mountain bike pioneers procured the wheels for their early bikes from American-made bicycles rather than the larger European standards in use. The typical 26-inch rim has a diameter of 559 millimetres (22.0 in) and an outside tire diameter of about 26.2 inches (670 mm).

==== 27.5 inch / ISO 584 mm ====
27.5-inch mountain bike wheels (which some also refer to as 650B use a rim that has a diameter of 584 mm (23.0″) with wide, knobby tires (≈27.5 ⋅ 2.3 / ISO 58-584) are approximately the midway point between the 26-inch (ISO-559mm) and the 29-inch (ISO-622mm) standards. They carry some of the advantages of both formats, with a smoother ride than a 26-inch wheel and more stiffness and durability than a 29″ wheel.

==== 29 inch / ISO 622 mm ====
"29-inch wheels", which also conform to the popular 700C (622 mm diameter clincher) wheel standard are becoming more popular for not only cyclocross bikes but also cross-country mountain bikes. Their rim diameter of 622 millimetres (24 1/2 in) is identical to most road, hybrid, and touring bicycle wheels, but they are typically reinforced for greater durability in off-road riding and wider to accommodate significantly wider tires. The average 29-inch mountain bike tire is ISO 59-622 - corresponding to an outside diameter of about 29.15 inches (740 mm).

32 inch / ISO 686

32-inch wheels have been in use on unicycles and have been appropriated for bicycles to create bikes more proportional for taller riders.

36 inch / ISO 787

36-inch wheels have been developed to create bikes more proportional for taller riders.

=== BMX wheels ===
There are two distinct wheel sizes that get described as 20 in., and both get used in the BMX sport.

==== 20 inch / ISO 406 mm ====
Usually 20 inches in diameter (rim diameter of 406 mm), BMX wheels are small for several reasons: they are suitable for young and small riders; their lower cost is compatible with inexpensive bicycles; the size makes them stronger to withstand the additional loads generated by BMX jumps and stunts; and to reduce rotational inertia for easier wheel acceleration.

==== 20 inch / ISO 451 mm ====
Nominally 20 × 1-1/8″ or 20 × 1-3/8″, with rim diameter 451 mm. These are intended for racing by lightweight BMX riders, and sometimes referred to as "skinnies". The size is also used on classic British folding or shopping bikes.

== Technical aspects ==
=== Sizes ===
Bicycle rims and tires came in many different types and sizes before efforts were made to standardize and improve wheel/tire compatibility. The International Organization for Standardization (ISO) and the European Tyre and Rim Technical Organisation (ETRTO) define a modern, unambiguous system of sizing designations and measurement procedures for different types of tires and rims in international standard ISO 5775. For example:

- For wired-edge tires the ISO designation lists the width of the inflated tire and the "bead-seat diameter", both in millimeters and separated by a hyphen: 37-622. The bead seat diameter (BSD) is the diameter of the surface of the rim upon which the tire bead sits.
- For rims the ISO designation lists the rim's bead seat diameter and the rim's inner width, both in millimeters and separated by a cross, along with a letter code for the rim type (e.g., "C" = Crochet-type): 622x19C

In practice, most tires (and inner tubes) sold today carry, in addition to the modern ISO 5775-1 designation, some historic size markings, which are still widely used:

- an old French tire designation that was based on the approximate outer diameter of the inflated tire in millimeters. The Japanese Industrial Standard JIS D 9112 continues to provide an official definition for the French tire designations. For example: 700×35 C.
- an old British inch-based designation: 597 mm (26 × 1 1/4), 590 mm (26 × 1 3/8), 630 mm (27 × 1 1/4), and 635 mm (28 × 1 1/2)

Which designation is most popular varies with region and type of bicycle. For a comprehensive equivalence table between old and new markings, see the ISO 5775 article, the table in Annex A of the ISO 5772 standard, as well as Tire Sizing by Sheldon Brown.

Most road and racing bicycles today use 622 mm diameter (700C) rims, though 650C rims are popular with smaller riders and triathletes. The 650C size has the ISO diameter size of 571 mm. Size 650B is 584 mm and 650A is 590 mm. 650B is being promoted as a 'best of both worlds' size for mountain biking. Most adult mountain bikes use 26 inch wheels. Smaller youth mountain bikes use 24 inch wheels. The larger 700C (29 inch) wheels have enjoyed some recent popularity among off-road bicycle manufacturers. These rims are the same bead seat diameter as 700C wheels and are generally compatible with bicycle frames and tires designed for the 700C standard, however, rims designated as 29 inch are designed for wider tires than rims designated 700C, so frame clearance may be an issue. The formerly popular 27 inch (630 mm) wheel size is now rare.

Children's bicycles are commonly sized primarily based on wheel diameter rather than seat tube length (along the rider's inseam) dimension. Thus, a wide range of small bike wheels are still found, ranging from 239 mm (9.4 in) diameter to 400 mm (16 in).

Smaller wheel sizes are also found on folding bicycles to minimise the folded size. These range from 16-inch diameter (e.g. Brompton) through 20 inches (e.g. Bike Friday) up to even 26 inches.

Wheel rims also come in a variety of widths to provide optimum performance for different uses. High performance road racing rims are narrow, 18 mm or so. Wider touring or durable off-road tires require rims of 24 mm wide or more.

==== 26 inch ====
The common "26-inch" wheel used on older mountain bikes and beach cruisers is an American size using a 559 mm rim, traditionally with hooked edges.

===== Other sizes 26″ =====
There are four other "26-inch" (British designation) or "650" (French) sizes, from the narrow tires to the widest, which traditionally all measured the same outside diameter.

- 650 - ISO 32-597 (26 ⋅ 1 1/4) - Older British sport bikes. Schwinns with narrow tires.
- 650A - ISO 37-590 (26 ⋅ 1 3/8) - Common on many vintage frames ranging from American-made Murray and Huffy as well as English and French manufactures like Raleigh and Peugeot.
- 650B - ISO 40-584 (26 ⋅ 1 1/2) - Also 650B demi-ballon. French tandems, Porteurs, touring bicycles; enjoying a revival. (584 mm rims with large volume ISO 56-584 knobby tires, aka; balloon, are also known as 27.5 inch mountain bike wheels)
- 650C - ISO 44-571 (26 ⋅ 1 3/4) - Formerly 47mm wide on Schwinn cruisers and for British trade/delivery bikes. Currently ISO 28-571, size is the same, but the narrower and less overall wheel diameter are built for triathlon, time trial and small road bikes.

Widths of tires and corresponding ISO width designations may vary, though the wheel outside diameter remains approximately the same.

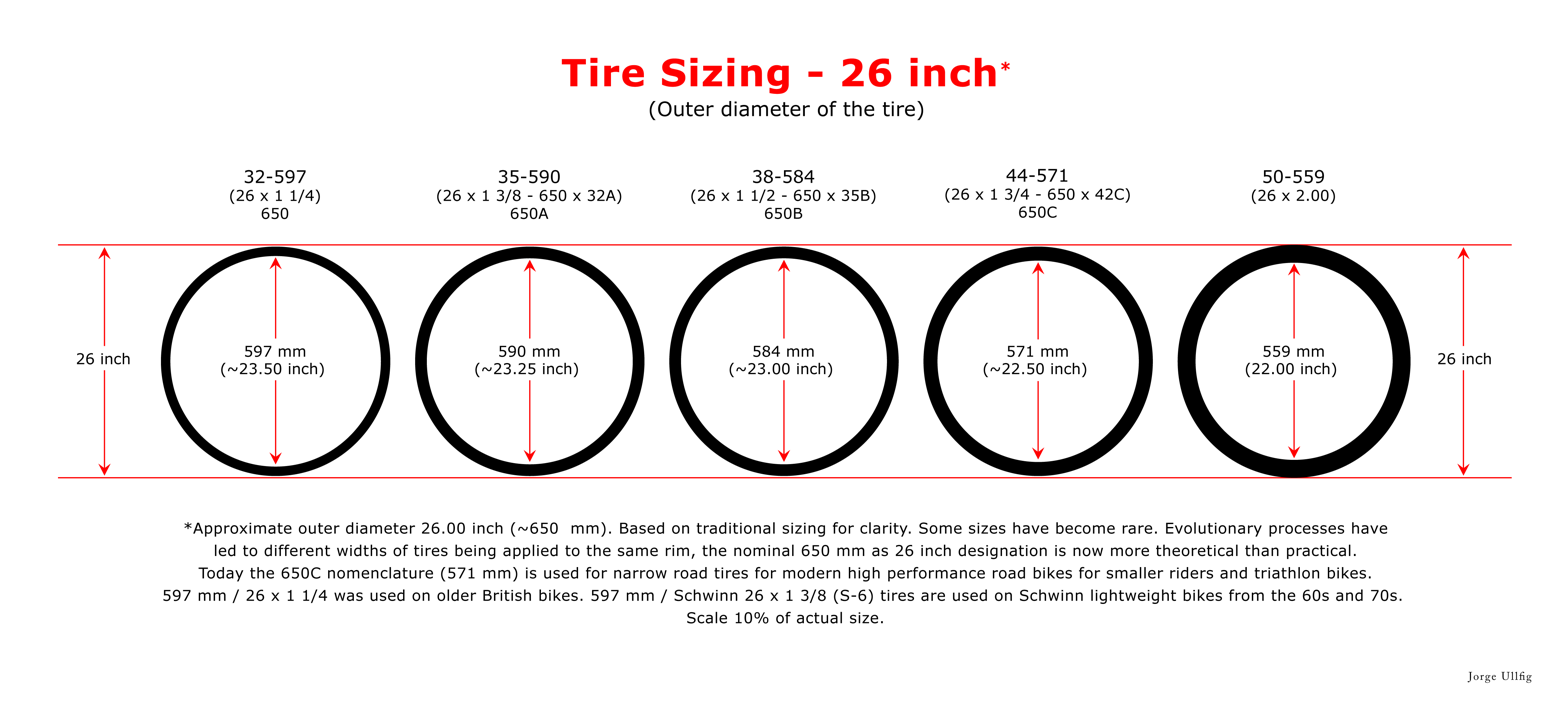

==== 28 inch ====
Traditionally, there were four different sizes of 28-inch diameter wheels, from the narrow tires to the widest, they all measured the same outside diameter, which coincide with four different families of 700 tire sizes, these are 700, 700A, 700B and 700C. The largest of these rims (ISO 647mm/642mm) with the narrower tires are no longer available.

28 Inches Obsolete sizes in grey
| Size (in fraction) | French Code | ISO | Application |
|---|---|---|---|
| 28 ⋅ 1 1/4 | 700 | 647mm | Old English and Dutch Bicycles / Old track bicycles |
| 28 ⋅ 1 3/8 | 700A | 642mm | Most old English sports bikes, almost extinct, now available in the Asia Pacific and the Middle East regions |
| 28 ⋅ 1 1/2 | 700B | 635mm | Roadster type bicycles of English, Dutch, Chinese and Indian origin / Classic Path Racer type bicycle of English origin / Maintaining in popularity throughout the world |
| 28 ⋅ 3/4; 28 ⋅ 1 1/8; 28 ⋅ 1 1/4 28 ⋅ 1 5/8 28 ⋅ 1 3/4; 29 ⋅ 2 3/8 | 700C | 622mm | ISO 18-622 through ISO 28-622, for racing bicycles, narrow wheels and the diameter of the wheel is less than 28 inches. ISO 32-622 through ISO 42-622, traditional urban bicycle size. ISO 47-622 (28 ⋅ 1 3/4) through ISO 60-622 (29 × 2.35). The 28 × 2.00, ISO 50-622 onwards, as a marketing term for wide tires for modern mountain bikes, are known as 29 inch for their larger wheel diameter and measured in decimal sizes. |

=== Rolling resistance ===
There are a number of variables that determine rolling resistance: tire tread, width, diameter, tire construction, tube type (if applicable), and pressure are all important.

Smaller diameter wheels, all else being equal, have higher rolling resistance than larger wheels. "Rolling resistance increases in near proportion as wheel diameter is decreased for a given constant inflation pressure."

Previously mountain bikes were based on 26 inch wheels but modern mountain bikes are often with 29 inch (622mm) wheels resulting in lower rolling resistance but changes to manoeuverability.

=== Rotating mass ===
Due to the fact that wheels rotate as well as translate (move in a straight line) when a bicycle moves, more force is required to accelerate a unit of mass on the wheel than on the frame. In wheel design, reducing the rotational inertia has the benefit of more responsive, faster-accelerating wheels. To accomplish this, wheel designs are employing lighter rim materials, moving the spoke nipples to the hub or using lighter nipples such as aluminum. Note however that rotational inertia is a factor only during acceleration (and deceleration/braking). At constant speed, aerodynamics are a significant factor. For climbing, total mass remains important. See Bicycle performance for more detail.

=== Dish ===
Diagram showing the difference in length and angle of spokes.

The hub flanges of modern tension-spoked bicycle wheels are always spaced wider than where the spokes attach to the rim. When viewed in cross section, the spokes and hub form a triangle, a structure that is stiff both vertically and laterally. In three dimensions, if the spokes were covered (visualize paper covering the spokes on each side), they would form two cones or "dishes." The greater the separation between the hub flanges, the deeper the dishes, and the stiffer and stronger the wheel can be laterally. The more vertical the spokes, the shallower the dish, and the less stiff the wheel will be laterally.

The dishes on each side of a wheel are not always equal. The cogset (freewheel or cassette) of a rear wheel and disc brake rotors, if installed, takes up width on the hub, and so the flanges may not be located symmetrically about the center plane of the hub or the bike. Since the rim must be centered, but the hub flanges are not, there is a difference in dish between the two sides. Such an asymmetrical wheel is called a "dished" wheel. The side of the wheel with less dish has slightly shorter but significantly higher-tensioned spokes than the side with more dish. Several different techniques have been tried to minimize this spoke asymmetry. In addition to modified hub geometry, some rims have off-center spoke holes, and the mounting of common J-bend spokes at the hub flange can be altered "inboard" or "outboard".

A truing stand or a dishing gauge, can be used to measure the position of the rim relative to the hub. Thus "dishing" is also used to describe the process of centering the rim on the hub, even in the case of symmetrical wheels.

=== Stiffness ===
The stiffness of a bicycle wheel can be measured in three primary directions: radial, lateral, and torsional. The radial stiffness is primarily a measure of how well the wheel absorbs bumps from the surface on which it rolls. Lateral stiffness, especially of the front wheel influences the handling of the bicycle. Torsional, or tangential stiffness is a measure of how well the wheel transmits propulsive and braking forces, if applied at the hub, as in the case of hub or disc brakes.

Several factors affect these stiffnesses to varying degrees. These include wheel radius, rim bending and torsional stiffness, number of spokes, spoke gauge, lacing pattern, hub stiffness, hub flange spacing, hub radius. In general lateral and radial stiffness decreases with the number of spoke crossings and torsional stiffness increases with the number of spoke crossings. One factor that has little influence on these stiffnesses is spoke tension.

Too much spoke tension, however, can lead to catastrophic failure in the form of buckling. The "most significant factor affecting the lateral spoke system stiffness" is the angle between the spokes and the wheel midplane. Thus any change that increases this angle, such as increasing the width of the hub, while keeping all other parameters constant, increases the resistance to buckling.

== See also ==
- Bicycle
- Bicycle tire
- Bicycle Wheel, 1916–17 Marcel Duchamp sculpture
- Bicycle wheel tools
- Downhill bike
- Glossary of cycling
- Mountain bike
- Spoke wrench
- The Bicycle Wheel (book)
- Wheelbuilding
- Wire wheel
