= Gurley (surname) =

Gurley is a surname. Notable people with the surname include:

- Akai Gurley (c. 1986–2014), African American shot and killed by mistake by a New York City policeman
- Bill Gurley (born 1966), American venture capitalist
- Buck Gurley (born 1978), former American college and professional football player
- Fred Gurley (1889–1976), president and executive committee chairman of Atchison, Topeka and Santa Fe Railway
- Henry Hosford Gurley (1788–1833), member of U.S. House of Representatives for Louisiana
- James Gurley (1939–2009), American musician
- John A. Gurley (1813–1863), Civil War–era Ohio congressman
- Michael Gurley, American musician
- O.W. Gurley, (1867-1935), businessman and real-estate developer known for being a founder of Greenwood District
- Phineas Densmore Gurley (1816–1868), Chaplain of the U.S. Senate and Presbyterian pastor in Washington, D.C.
- Ralph Randolph Gurley (1797–1872), clergyman and a major force in the American Colonization Society
- Roger Gurley (born 1965), football coach and referee from Saint Vincent and the Grenadines
- Todd Gurley (born 1994), American football player
- Tony Gurley (born 1956), American businessman and political figure from North Carolina
- Tori Gurley (born 1987), American football player
- William Gurley (1821–1887) co-founded what is now known as Gurley Precision Instruments in Troy, New York State
- Zenas H. Gurley, Sr. (1801–1871), leader in the Latter Day Saint movement

== See also ==
- Rebecca Gurley Bace (1955-2017), computer security expert and pioneer in intrusion detection
- Helen Gurley Brown (1922–2012), author and longtime editor-in-chief of Cosmopolitan magazine
- Elizabeth Gurley Flynn (1890–1964), feminist socialist organizer
