= Gurley Novelty =

American candle maker

Gurley Novelty or simply Gurley was an American novelty candle company that existed throughout the second half of the 20th century. Gurley was known for making small, figurine-shaped candles for various holidays, such as Christmas, Thanksgiving, and Halloween. The company was owned by Franklin C. Gurley, who also designed the candles. In recent decades, Gurley candles have become popular collectible items.

== History ==
The company started out in Buffalo, New York in the 1939 as part of Franklin C. Gurley's W&F Manufacturing Co. Inc., a confectionery company that produced candies and chocolates in addition to wax novelties, such as wax lips and teeth. The company's first line of novelty candles was commissioned by the Socony-Vacuum Oil Company (now ExxonMobil) as a way to reuse excess paraffin produced as a by-product of the oil refinery process. These early Gurley products were marketed under the name Tavern, and consisted of a number of small figural candles in holiday–themed shapes such as ghosts, pilgrims, and Santa Claus. By the late 1940s the company's business had become almost exclusively novelty candles. In 1949 Franklin Gurley bought the rights to the Tavern brand, and changed the name to the Gurley Novelty Co.

Under the Gurley Novelty Co. brand, the company continued to manufacture the small figural holiday-themed candles. Although the candles were produced with a wick, they were not marketed as practical candles intended to be lit; but rather as small wax figures for display and decoration. Smaller candles were sold individually out of shallow cardboard boxes. Sets and larger candles were sold in sealed paper boxes. Beginning in the 1960s the two and three-candle sets, and larger candles, were generally sold shrink-wrapped in cellophane. Most candles had a round paper label attached to the bottom.

=== Pricing ===
Tavern and Gurley candles were inexpensive. For decades, the 3½–inch figures were sold for 10¢ each, in packs of two for 29¢, and three for 49¢. Individual larger sizes rarely exceeded 99¢. Tavern, and later Gurley, candles were primarily sold at dime stores such as Ben Franklin's and Woolworth's, though they could also be found at larger stores such as Macy's. Sales continued to rise throughout the 1950s and peaked in the late 1960s. By the late 1970s the company was in decline. Today, Gurley Novelty candles are popular collectibles.

=== Reproductions ===
In the 2000s, the original Gurley candle molds were purchased by the Vermont Country Store, which sells reproductions of various designs.
