= Tire iron =

Specialized metal tool used in working with tires

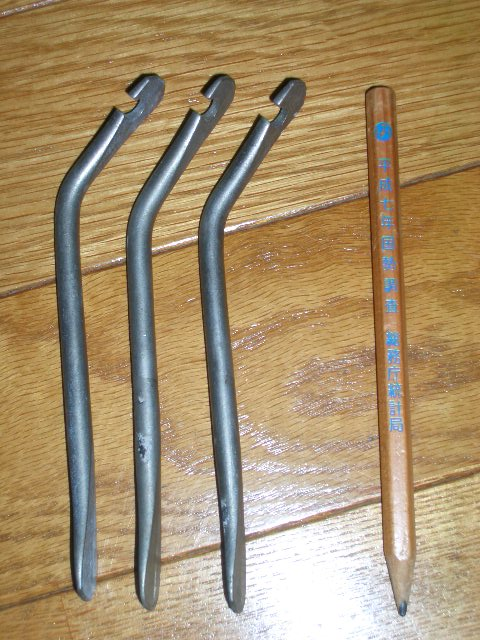
Typical set of three metal tire levers of the type used on bicycles

A tire iron (also tire lever or tire spoon) is a specialized metal or plastic tool used in working with tires. Tire irons have not been in common use for automobile tires since the shift to the use of tubeless tires in the late 1950s.

Bicycle tire irons are still in use for those tires which have a separate inner tube, and can have a hooked C-shape cut into one end of the iron so that it may be hooked on a bicycle spoke to hold it in place.

== Description and use ==
Tire irons, which usually come in pairs or threes, are used to pry the edge of a tire away from the rim of the wheel it has been mounted on. After one iron has pried a portion of the tire from its wheel, it is held in position while a second iron is applied further along the tire to pry more of the tire away from the wheel. This allows enough of the tire to be separated so that the first iron can be removed, and used again on the far side of the other iron. Alternating in this way, a person can work all the way around the tire to fully remove it from the wheel, in order to reach the tube that sits inside.

In the first half of the 20th century, they became a colloquial term of strength, as in "I couldn't get rid of him with a pair of tire irons," and frequently appeared in cartoons in similar situations. The usage is now considered passé.

== Bicycle tire irons ==
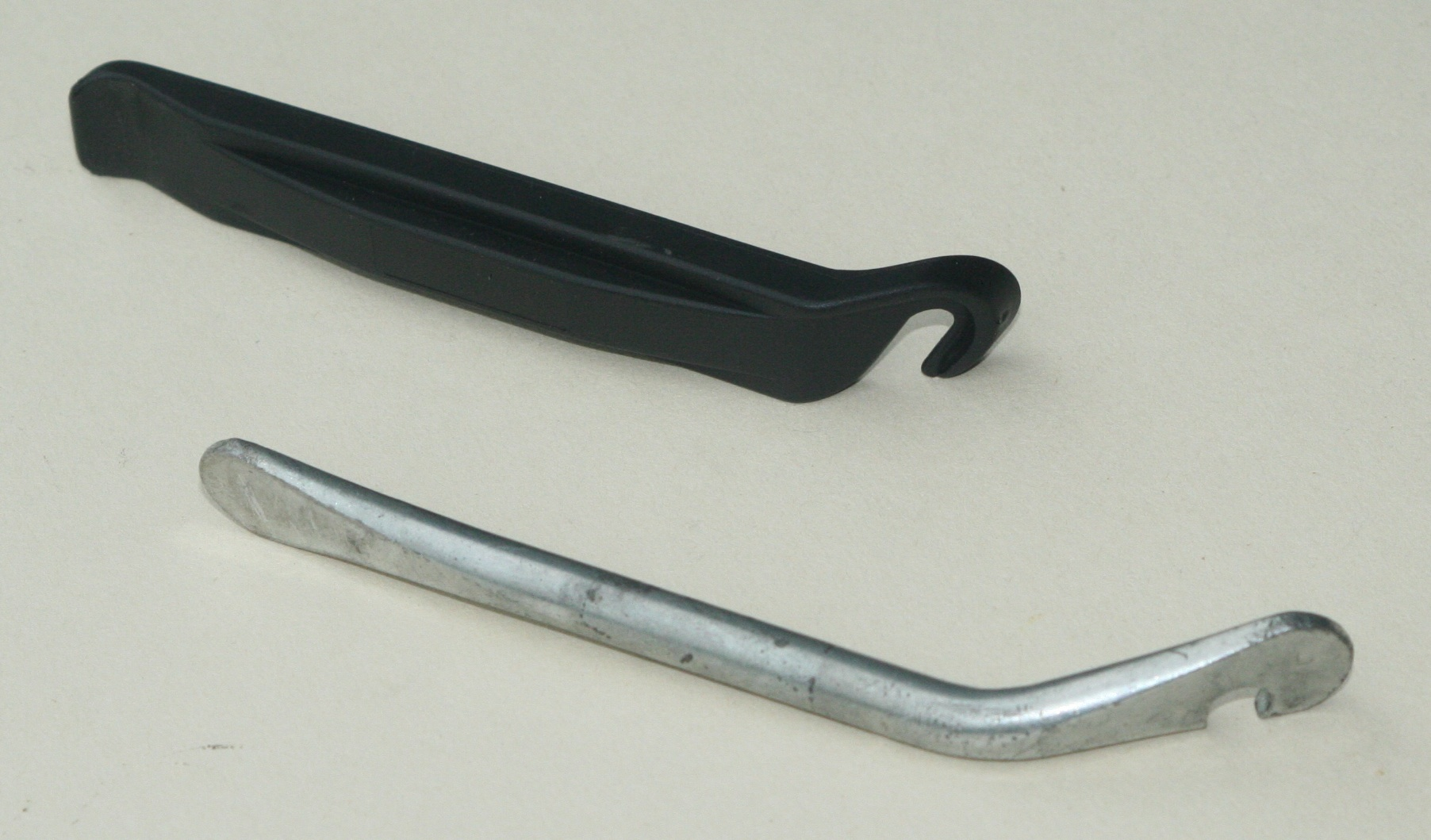
Plastic and metal tire levers

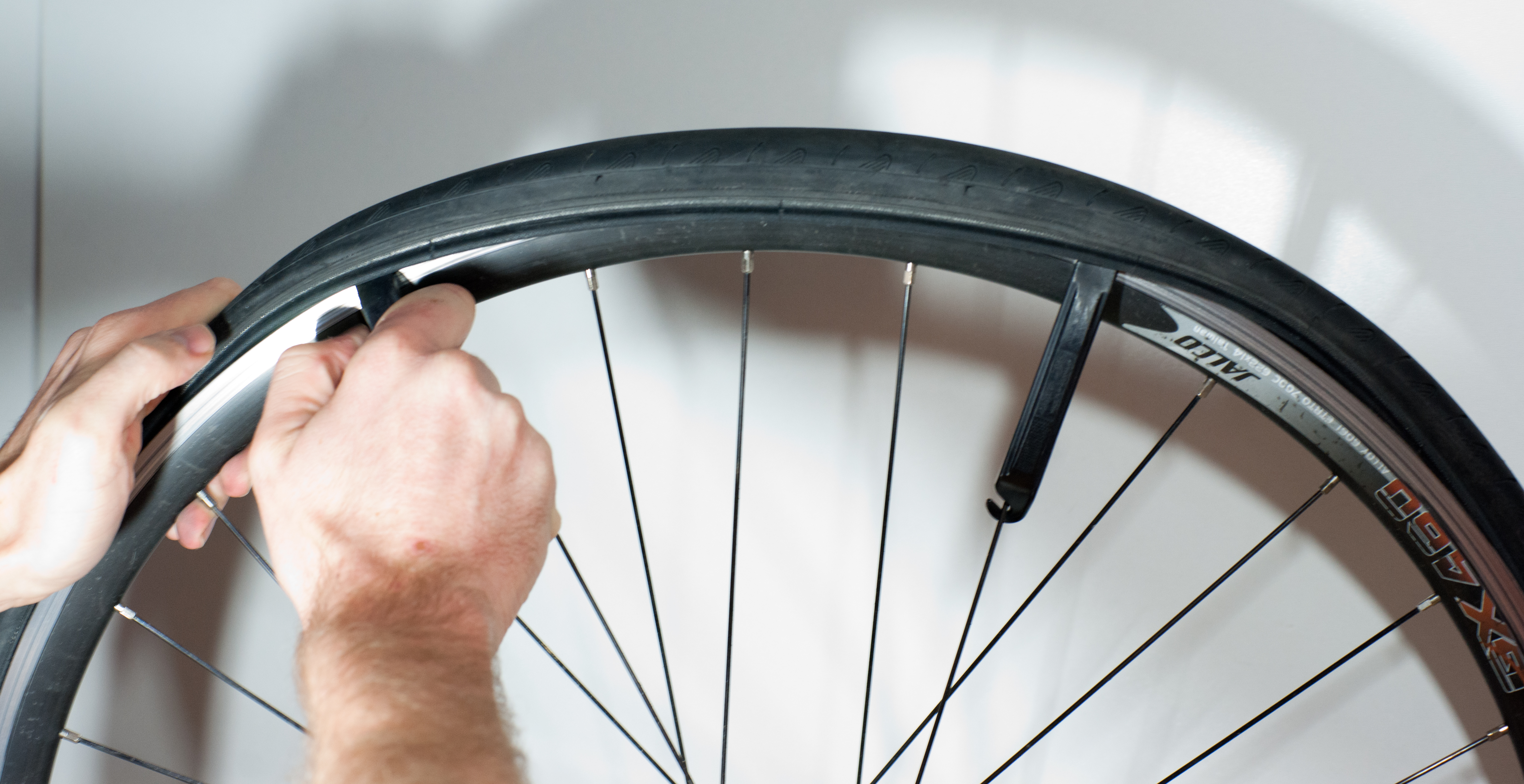
Removing a tire with tire levers. One lever is hooked onto a spoke.

Tire irons for bicycles are usually referred to as "tire levers", as they are often made of plastic, not metal.

Tire levers for bicycle tires have one end that is tapered and slightly curved. The other end is usually hooked so that it can be hooked around a spoke to keep the tire bead free of the rim at one point, allowing a second lever to be manipulated forward, progressively loosening a larger segment of the tire bead from the rim.

A common feature of tire levers is the lack of sharp edges. The slightest pinch of an inner tube by a lever can weaken or puncture the tube. It is good practice to examine a set of tire levers for any sharp edges and to file them smooth and round. Another problem, though less critical, is that a steel lever would scratch aluminum rims.

Classically, tire levers were made of metal. However plastic ones are now manufactured which are even less sharp and less likely to puncture the tube. There are also some single-lever varieties, which can be inserted under the bead at one point then quickly pushed around the rim to pop the bead off.

Tire levers are not necessary or desirable in all cases. In some cases, the tire can be reinserted on the rim, and sometimes removed from the rim, without the use of tire levers. This reduces the chance of puncture caused by pinching the tube between the rim and the tire bead. Sometimes they are used to fit the tire back on, but this can be done without the levers.

== See also ==
- Bead breaker
- Crowbar
- Lug wrench
