= Beadlock =

Device securing a tire bead to a wheel

A beadlock or bead lock is a mechanical device that secures the bead of a tire to the wheel of a vehicle. Tires and wheels are designed so that when the tire is inflated, the tire pressure pushes the bead of the tire against the inside of the wheel rim so that the tire stays on the wheel and the two rotate together. In situations where tire pressure is insufficient to hold the bead of the tire in place, a beadlock is needed.

There are several styles of beadlocks. For four-wheel drive vehicles, a ring with a number of bolts around the circumference can be used to clamp the tire to the wheel. For motorcycles, a rim lock or bead stopper is a curved plate tightened by a single bolt. For both four-wheel drive vehicles and motorcycles, a different style of beadlock can be used that is similar to an inner tube which is inflated to press the tire against the wheel.

== History ==
Dodge Military trucks had the first beadlocks, called Combat Wheels; the 'combat wheels' were a divided-rim, that used a bolted-on retaining ring replacing the normal split ring wheels. They were designed for quick and easy tire replacement during combat, hence the name.

== Purpose ==
Air pressure within a tire forces its beads against the wheel rim and normally ensures that the tire and rim rotate as a single unit. In general automotive situations, a tire's air pressure is sufficient to withstand dislodging and rim-slip forces experienced during, respectively, hard cornering and acceleration (including negative acceleration or "braking"). Low tire pressure therefore poses the hazard of enabling sudden loss of air, loss of control, and even a rollover during hard braking or an evasive maneuver (in addition to generally promoting excessive tire heat and future failure). Modern automotive tires have a soft rubber formulation at the beads to help maintain good rim contact, so special bead-lock means are not required.

High traction is desired for tires for automobile dirt track racing, off-road racing, off-road vehicles, and off-road motorcycles, so their tread is therefore coarse. Nevertheless, some riders will lower the tire pressure to cause the tread to spread out and create a larger contact patch. This practice can create a safety hazard, as there may not be enough pressure to adequately secure the tire beads to the wheel. Reactive ground forces push a tire to one side or the other, especially the outside rear tire of a racing vehicle when it is turning in a corner of a track. This could cause a bead of the tire to come off the rim completely, or enough to cause partial loss of air. It is also possible for the tire to have more traction on the ground than there is friction between the tire and rim. In this case the wheel would slip around the tire beads without turning the tire. Beadlocks, of one form or another including adhesive, are therefore used to keep the beads of off-road tires firmly seated and prevent slip, even when inflation pressure is low.

== Standard beadlocks ==
A standard beadlock is designed to clamp the tire bead between an outer and an inner ring. The inner ring may be welded onto a standard wheel increasing wheel width by anywhere from 1 1/2 to 2 inches (3.8 to 5.1 cm) or may be formed as part of the wheel when the wheel is made in the factory. The outer ring is then bolted onto the inner ring with the bead clamped between them. Anywhere between 16 and 32 bolts at around 10 pound force-feet (14 N⋅m) are used around the circumference of the wheel to keep the clamp tight. The rings and bolts can cause problems with balancing the wheel and tire because all the added weight is on one side. This style is used exclusively for offroad use.

Most standard beadlocks clamp only the outside bead because this is the side that comes unseated most often while off-roading.

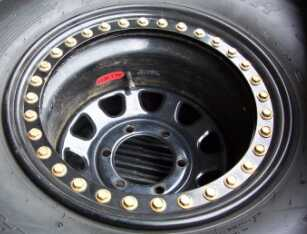
A standard beadlock with tire mounted and bolts tightened

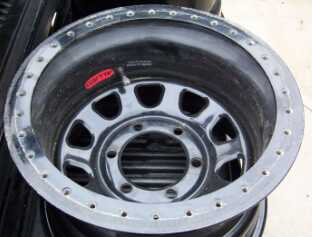
The same wheel with the tire, bolts, and outer ring removed

== Internal beadlocks ==
An internal beadlock is very much like an inner tube within the tire that pushes the bead of the tire tight against the wheel. The internal beadlock is inflated via its own valve stem. The side of the beadlock closest to the tread, the "case", has a layer of thick fabric, generally polyester, which keeps the beadlock from inflating too far up into the tire. This forces the sides into the tire which compresses the bead of the tire against the wheel.

== Dual beadlocks ==
For extreme off-road racing, dual beadlocks—one each on the inner and outer sides of the rim—can be used.

== Streetlocks ==
Also referred to as "simulated beadlocks", streetlocks are a decorative element in which the wheel manufacturer casts or machines the appearance of bolt heads into the rim of a wheel. This provides the appearance of beadlocks, but no functional benefits beyond the internal bead seat common to automotive wheels. This may be used in countries where real beadlocks are not street-legal.

== Motorcycle rim locks ==
Motorcycle tires use a different style of beadlock, also known as a rim lock or bead stopper. Motorcycle tire rim locks clamp both beads at once because the tire is narrow enough to do this conveniently with one device, and also because there is no such thing as an "inside bead" or "outside bead" on a motorcycle tire. A curved metal plate inside the tire presses both beads outward against the inside of the wheel rim to clamp both beads at once in one localized area. A threaded stem attached to the plate is placed through a hole in the "well" of the rim, with the plate inside the tire and the threaded stem on the outside. The rim lock is tightened using either a standard bolt that leaves the threads visible, or a special bolt that covers the threads. The threaded stem or special bolt is visible on the inner surface of the wheel and points towards the axle, just like the valve stem.

For motorcycle tires, a device similar to the internal beadlock of four-wheel drive vehicles can be used. A special inner tube is inflated via its own valve stem to high pressure to push the bead of the tire tight against the wheel. Like the rim lock, this clamps both beads at once. The regular valve stem is used to inflate the tire to the desired pressure.

== See also ==
- Bead breaker
- Tire changer
