= RIFA AB =

Electronics manufacturer

- Formerly: Radioindustrins Fabrik Aktiebolag
- Type: Aktiebolag
- Industry: Electronics
- Founded: 1942; 84 years ago
- Defunct: 1988; 38 years ago
- Fate: Capacitor business sold to Finvest Oy and renamed to Evox Rifa AB; company restructured and renamed to Ericsson Microelectronics AB
- Headquarters: Sweden
- Products: Capacitors; Integrated circuits
- Parent: Allmänna Svenska Elektriska Aktiebolaget (1942–1947); Telefonaktiebolaget LM Ericsson (1947–1988)

RIFA AB (originally an abbreviation for Radioindustrins Fabrik Aktiebolag) was a Swedish electronics manufacturer of resistors and capacitors, which was established in 1942. During World War II, RIFA manufactured parts for the Swedish radio industry. In 1947, it became incorporated into Telefonaktiebolaget LM Ericsson. Later, in 1988, it became Ericsson Components, followed by Ericsson Microelectronics in 2000. The company made hybrid components for telephone exchanges for the joint venture company Ellemtel between Ericsson and Televerket.

== Foundation and capacitor manufacturing ==
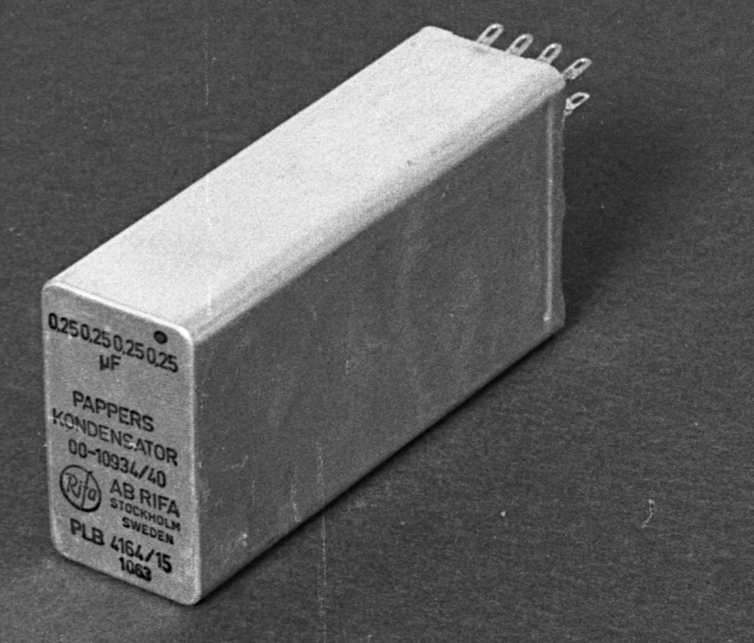
A paper capacitor manufactured by RIFA

The company was founded in 1942 as Radioindustrins Fabrik Aktiebolag (RIFA), as a business unit of Allmänna Svenska Elektriska Aktiebolaget (ASEA). It was one of many divisions formed by ASEA during World War II; RIFA in particular was formed to keep the supply of capacitors in Sweden steady during the war.

Future acquirer Telefonaktiebolaget LM Ericsson initially had no desire to invest in RIFA, due to their ownership of rival capacitor manufacturer, AB Alpha, which they bought in 1929 and integrated into Ericsson's own capacitor manufacturing. After the war, however, demand for Ericsson's products increased and a shortage of capacitors arose. On 29 December 1946, Ericsson purchased a 50 percent share of RIFA from other investors, leaving ASEA as the only other principal owner. On 1 January 1947, Ericsson bought out ASEA's share and became the new, sole owner of RIFA. Ericsson subsequently folded AB Alpha into RIFA.

In 1960 Ericsson bought factory space in Gränna and moved all production of electrolytic capacitors there the following year. In 1962 RIFA built a new factory for the manufacture of paper and plastic film capacitors in Kalmar. The Kalmar factory was put into operation in 1964 and also began manufacturing its Miniprint brand of film capacitors, spark arrestors and electrolytic capacitors.

== Semiconductor manufacturing ==
7400-series integrated circuit from RIFA

In 1967, RIFA bought Svenska Elektronrör AB, giving the company the facilities to manufacture vacuum tubes and semiconductors in addition to capacitors. Thereafter, they began manufacturing diodes in Svenska Elektronrör's factory in Bollmora outside Stockholm. Ericsson also became a reseller for several international semiconductor manufacturers such as General Electric, Thomson-CSF and Panasonic. In 1971 RIFA formed a joint venture with National Semiconductor; in 1977 operations were moved from the Stockholm area to a newly built factory in Kista. At this facility, RIFA gradually built up a knowledge base for the manufacture of integrated circuits with an emphasis on MOSFETs.

RIFA became a core element of Ericsson's business in the 1980s: it produced circuitry for the AXE telephone exchange and the Ericsson MD110 PBX, as well as the optoelectronics necessary for Ericsson's core product lines. In 1980, Ericsson entered into a long-term contract with Advanced Micro Devices (AMD) to install equipment for the manufacture of large-scale integrated circuits. In the spring of 1981, RIFA received the equipment from AMD and established the LSI Design Center for the development of LSI circuits and greenlit pilot production of NMOS circuits in RIFA's Kista factory. LSI Design Center's first product was a 4 kb SRAM chip.

By 1983, RIFA purchased from Motorola the facilities to make photomasks for programmable gate arrays circuits in a 5-μm process. This technology was used to develop a print head microcontroller, named PHC, for Facit AB. In 1983, RIFA extended their agreement with AMD and were given access to the CS-2 process with the aim of enabling Ericsson to manufacture its own application-specific integrated circuits (or ASIC, the successor to LSI components). This process was used in a circuit for a batch coding machine in 1984. The Swedish government supported the operation through the National Microelectronics Program (NMP), which was established through a bill on 20 October 1983.

In 1985, RIFA had developed its own standard cell library that could be used with CAD programs from Silvar Lisco and Phoenix Data Systems, combined with the circuit simulation program SPICE.

During 1987, RIFA formed a joint venture with Texas Instruments, gaining access to the 500 nm BiCMOS process for the production of semiconductors. They were thus able to manufacture so-called "submicron" components.

== Capacitor divestiture and Ericsson Components ==
On 1 March 1988, RIFA sold their capacitor business to Finvest Oy, who also assumed the RIFA brand. Capacitor production for RIFA by 1988 constituted a fifth of Ericsson's profit and employed roughly 1,400 people. Finvest Oy previously owned the capacitor manufacturer Evox. After acquiring RIFA, Finvest Oy merged the two companies into Evox Rifa AB. RIFA's circuit and silicon business (integrated circuits) was renamed to Ericsson Components AB on 1 April 1988; it renamed itself again to Ericsson Microelectronics AB shortly after.

Evox Rifa AB was thereafter split across three factories: a factory in Gränna for the manufacture of electrolytic capacitors; a factory in Kalmar for the manufacture of paper and precision capacitors; and a factory in Kista for the development of integrated circuits.

== End of capacitor manufacturing in Sweden ==
The need for precision capacitors, which were important in Ericsson's telephone exchanges to filter different telephone calls from each other, disappeared with the move to digital telephony. Capacitor manufacturing was thus no longer a core business for Ericsson – and likely why it was sold. Evox Rifa closed down their Kalmar factory in 2005, which then had about 220 employees. Some operations in Kalmar (development of film capacitors, sales and customer service) were then moved to a subsidiary, Dectron AB, in Algutsrum on Öland, which they acquired in 2001. The factory in Gränna was near closure in 2003, after a large part of the production had been moved to Weymouth, Dorset, in the United Kingdom, in a factory previously owned by AVX. In 2007, the entire Evox Rifa group was acquired by KEMET Corporation. KEMET merged Dectron AB with the operations in Gränna into KEMET Electronics AB, across two facilities. In June 2019, the operations in Gränna were closed, when the manufacturing of axial electrolytic capacitors that remained after 2003 was moved to Évora in Portugal. At the time of closure, 60 employees remained. KEMET Electronics was later acquired by Yageo Corporation, in June 2020.

== Legacy ==
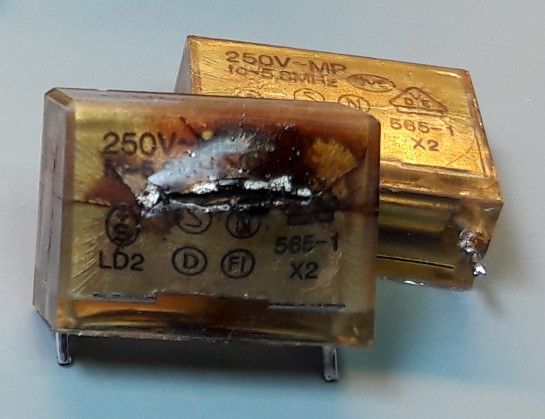
Two RIFA-manufactured X2 paper capacitors, one of which has failed

On 6 June 1984, the Swedish Post Office issued a series of stamps with the title Made in Sweden to celebrate Swedish innovation and Swedish patents. One of the stamps was dedicated to RIFA and the stamp depicts a Subscriber Line Integrated Circuit (SLIC) for managing subscriber steps in Ericsson's telephone exchanges. The stamp had a denomination of SEK 2 70 öre and was designed by Tom Hultgren and engraved by Zlatko Jakus.

RIFA's class-X2 paper capacitors, widely used in 1970s and 1980s equipment within mains filtering circuits, but manufactured to this day, are well-known in hobbyist circles for their explosive failure mode, mainly after long periods of disuse. These failures are potentially caused by cracks forming, which then allow moisture into the capacitor, when these capacitors are then energized after long periods of disuse, this results in them failing explosively. This type of failure mainly occurs in mains AC use cases.
