= Norris Production Solutions =

American oilfield services company

Dover Artificial Lift
- Company type: Public
- Traded as: NYSE: DOV; S&P 500 Component
- Industry: Oilfield equipment and services
- Founded: 2009; 17 years ago
- Headquarters: The Woodlands, Texas
- Key people: Dan Newman (President)
- Products: Artificial lift Surface production
- Number of employees: 1700 (2011)
- Parent: Dover Corporation (former)
- Website: www.doverals.com

Dover Artificial Lift (formerly Norris Production Solutions) is an oilfield services company headquartered in The Woodlands, Texas. The company provides products and services for artificial lift during production of petroleum and natural gas. Dover Artificial Lift was a member of Dover Corporation until 2018, when it was spun off as part of Apergy Energy.

== History ==
The company was formed in 2009 to merge the artificial lift and surface production companies that existed within Dover Corporation. The history of member companies dates back to 1882 when Norris Rods was formed by inventor and businessman WC Norris in Tiona, Pennsylvania. In 1962, Dover acquires Norrisseal, a supplier of valve and control solutions. In 1963 Dover acquires Alberta Oil Tool, the Canadian manufacturer of Norris brand products.

In 1988 Dover acquires Ferguson Beauregard, a provider of various solutions to production problems including self-contained plunger lift systems, electronic controllers, and fully integrated, remotely managed production systems. Ferguson Beauregard later merged with PCS when it was acquired in 2012 and the combined PCS and Ferguson Beauregard organizations became known as PCSFerguson.

In 2001 Dover Corporation formed a segment within the company called Dover Energy, focused on providing products and solutions that serve the drilling, production and downstream markets, including a presence in artificial lift technologies. In 2004 Dover acquires Flexbar Sinkerbars, a designer and manufacturer of effective weight sinkerbars and associated equipment. In 2005 Dover acquires C-Tech Design and Manufacturing, a manufacturer of equipment and machinery for the oilfield service industry including custom built coiled tubing units, rapid-rod service units, flush-by units and coiled tubing and rod injectors. In 2006 an Artificial Lift Services group is formed within Dover Energy. In 2007 Dover acquires Theta Oilfield Services Inc., specialized in Rod Pumping Optimization software and training.

Dover Artificial Lift was formed in 2009 including Norris Rods, Fergusen Beauregard, Alberta Oil Tool, Norrisseal, C-Tech Design & Manufacturing, and Theta Oilfield Services Inc.

In 2011, Dover Corporation acquires Harbison Fischer and Oil Lift Technology Inc. Both companies became member brands within Norris Production Solutions. Harbison-Fischer serves the sub-surface oil field rod pump market specializing in downhole rod pump manufacturing, application, and training. Oil Lift Technology Inc. specializes in progressive cavity pump systems, and has over 10 field service facilities in Canada, the United States, Australia, Colombia and Oman. Oil Lift products include wellhead drives, Rod-Lock BOPs©, progressing cavity pumps and remote power units.

In 2012, Dover acquired Production Control Systems. PCS has roots in plunger lift and well control holding several patents on plungers and associated equipment. PCS also provides a suite of well controllers and automation systems, and solutions for gas lift and nitrogen generation. They merged with Ferguson Beauregard to become PCS Ferguson, a member brand within Norris Production Solutions.

== Operations ==
Dover Artificial Lift focuses on artificial lift and production optimization solutions. The company provides rod lift, progressing cavity pump, gas lift and plunger lift systems and is qualified to provide both discrete and integrated solutions across the artificial lift spectrum.
