= Richard Tobin =

Richard Tobin may refer to:

- Richard Tobin (luthier) (c. 1771–1847), Irish luthier
- Richard M. Tobin (1866–1952), American banker and diplomat
- Dick Tobin (1896–1957), Irish hurler
- Richard J. Tobin (born 1963), American businessman
