= Tokin Corporation =

Japanese manufacturing company

TOKIN Corporation
- Native name: トーキン
- Company type: KK
- Industry: Electrical components
- Predecessors: Japan Specialty Metals KK (日本特殊金属株式会社); Tohoku Metal Industries KK (東北金属工業株式会社); KK Tōkin (株式会社トーキン)
- Founded: April 8, 1938; 87 years ago
- Headquarters: Shiroishi, Miyagi, Japan
- Area served: Worldwide
- Products: Electrical and electronic parts
- Parent: Yageo Corporation
- Website: www.tokin.com

TOKIN Corporation is a Japanese electrical and electronic industrial and automotive parts manufacturing company. Since April 2017 it has been a wholly owned subsidiary of KEMET Corporation. Previously it was named NEC TOKIN (NECトーキン株式会社, NEC Tōkin Kabushiki-gaisha) and was part of the NEC Group. It is headquartered in Shiroishi, Miyagi Prefecture, Japan.

In February 2013, KEMET Corporation invested in the company to provide capital for Tokin to expand its business. After this investment, KEMET owned 34% of the company, and NEC owned a 66% controlling share.

In September 2015, TOKIN pleaded guilty to fixing the prices of electrolytic capacitors between 2002 and 2013 in a criminal lawsuit filed in the United States District Court for the Northern District of California by the United States Department of Justice, and was required to pay a fine of $13.8 million USD.

In April 2017, KEMET purchased a 61% controlling interest, making Tokin its wholly owned subsidiary. Once the purchase was complete, the company changed its name to "TOKIN Corporation".
