= Ravaglioli S.p.A. =

Ravaglioli S.p.A. is a manufacturer of automotive repair workshop equipment for both passenger and commercial vehicle lifting founded in 1958.

== Overview ==
Ravaglioli S.p.A. was founded in 1958 by Damiano Ravaglioli in Bologna, Italy. The company initially produced specialized workbenches and lifting equipment, before developing equipment for Trilex tires, a brand of heavy duty commercial tire.

In 2016, Ravaglioli S.p.A. was acquired by Dover and became a part of their Vehicle Service Group.

Today, Ravaglioli's products include automotive lifts, wheel balancers, tire changers, wheel aligners, and complete test lanes.
