= Markem-Imaje =

Manufacturing company

MARKEM-IMAJE
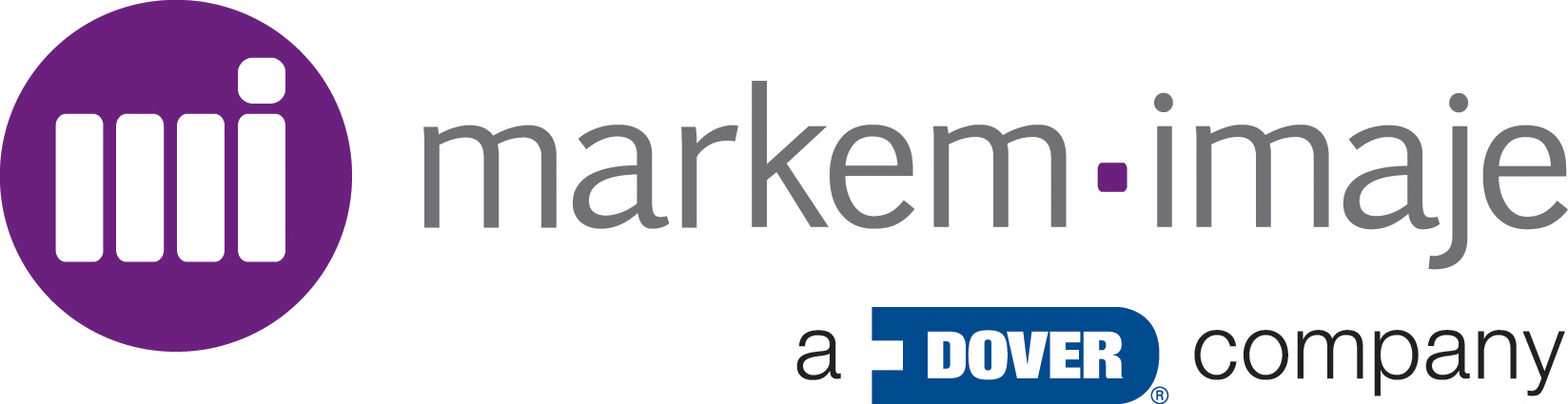
- Company type: Public
- Industry: Industrial Printers – marking, coding and traceability
- Predecessor: Markem Corporation and Imaje S.A.
- Founded: 2007
- Headquarters: Geneva, Switzerland
- Area served: Worldwide
- Key people: Vincent Vanderpoel (President)
- Number of employees: Approx. 3,000 (2015)
- Parent: Dover Corporation
- Website: MARKEM-IMAJE.COM

Markem-Imaje is a global manufacturer and distributor of specialized traceability, variable data and product identification equipment, for customers in the packaging industry. The company is headquartered in Geneva, Switzerland. Markem-Imaje is a wholly owned subsidiary of Illinois-based Dover Corporation.

== History ==
Markem-Imaje was formed in 2007 from the merger of New-Hampshire-based Markem Corporation and the French company Imaje S.A., companies within Dover Corporation's Dover Engineered Systems. Started in 1911 in Keene, New Hampshire, Markem Corporation established itself as a designer and distributor of hardware, software and services for product identification. The company was named one of New Hampshire's Best Companies to Work For each year between 2003 and 2005. Markem Corporation was acquired by Dover Corporation in 2006.

Founded in 1982 by industrialist Jean-Claude Millet, Imaje S.A. developed continuous inkjet technology, a printing method in which the printer makes no physical contact with the item being marked. Imaje S.A. was acquired by Dover Corporation in 1995. The combined Markem-Imaje claims to be the world's largest provider of product identification solutions.
