= Electronic Caregiver Tower =

Building in Las Cruces, New Mexico, US

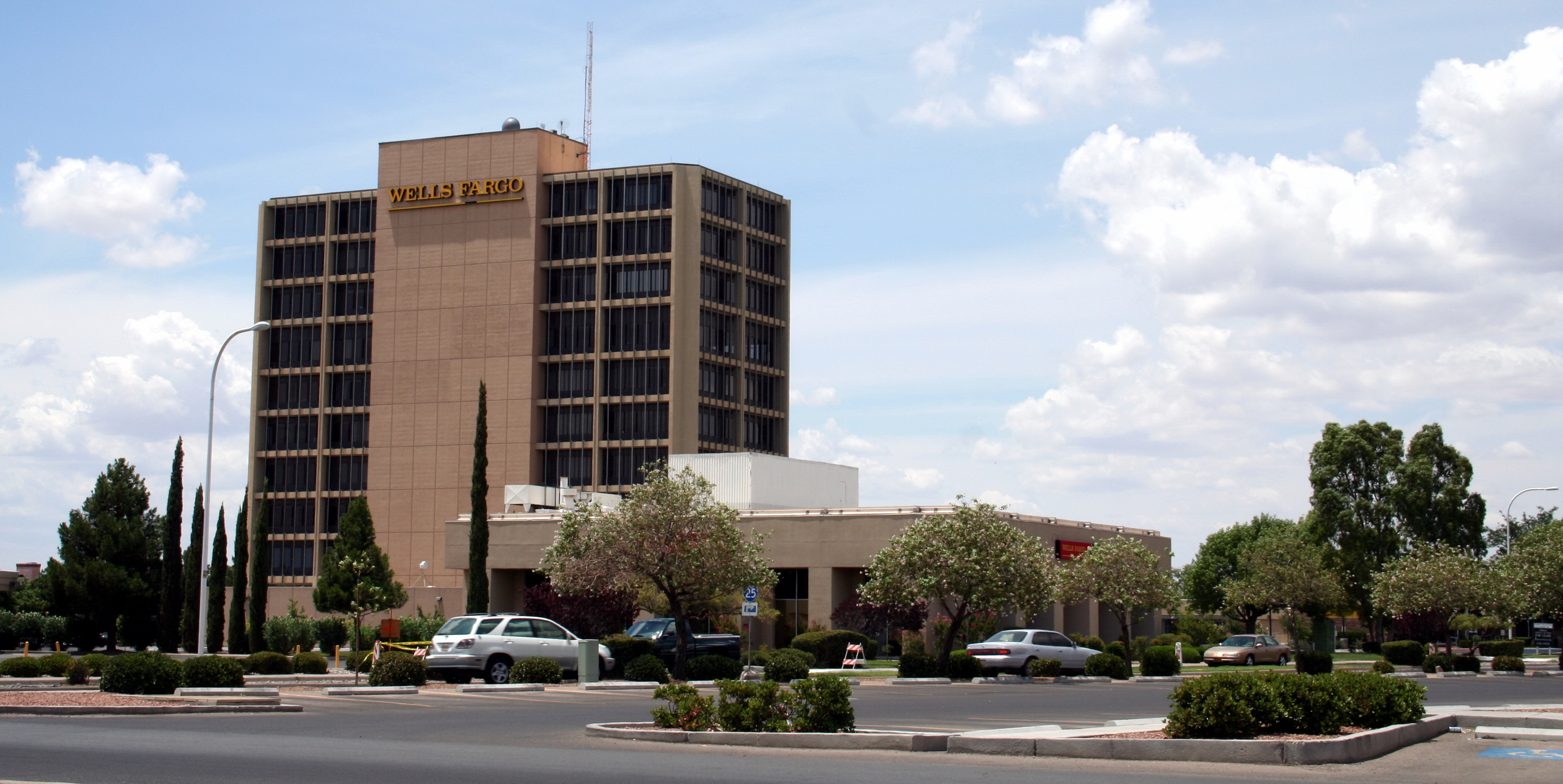
- Interactive map of the Electronic Caregiver Tower area
- Former names: Wells Fargo Tower (2001 – 2018); First National Bank Tower (1962 – 2001)

Record height
- Tallest in Doña Ana County, New Mexico since 1962^{[I]}

General information
- Architectural style: Modern
- Location: 506 South Main Street, Las Cruces, New Mexico, United States
- Coordinates: 32.3053°N 106.7786°W
- Current tenants: Abraham's Restaurant; Electronic Caregiver; Federal and state public defenders Volt
- Completed: 1962
- Renovated: 2016
- Cost: $2,360,000.00
- Owner: Las Cruces Tower LLP
- Landlord: NAI 1st Valley

Height
- Height: 121.97 feet

Technical details
- Floor count: 11 (10 storeys and 1 basement)
- Floor area: 5,163 square feet
- Grounds: 3.5 acres

Other information
- Parking: 272 parking spaces

Electronic Caregiver Tower (formerly Las Cruces Tower, Wells Fargo Tower and First National Bank Tower) is a high-rise building located on 506 Main Street in Las Cruces, New Mexico. It opened in 1962 and was originally planned to be only 7 stories tall. The final height of the tower is 120 ft (37 m) and is 10 stories tall above ground, plus a basement floor below ground. Wells Fargo bought the building in 2001 and renamed it, after acquiring First National Bank's parent company. Healthcare technology company Electronic Caregiver purchased the naming rights to the tower in 2018. The building has 3 elevators (originally Otis, modernized by Dover); there are restrooms on every floor but the lobby and basement. It is the tallest building in Las Cruces and the tallest building in New Mexico outside of Albuquerque. Tenants include Electronic Caregiver, and offices of both the state and federal public defenders.
