= Tire changer =

Machine used to help tire technicians dismount and mount tires with automobile wheels

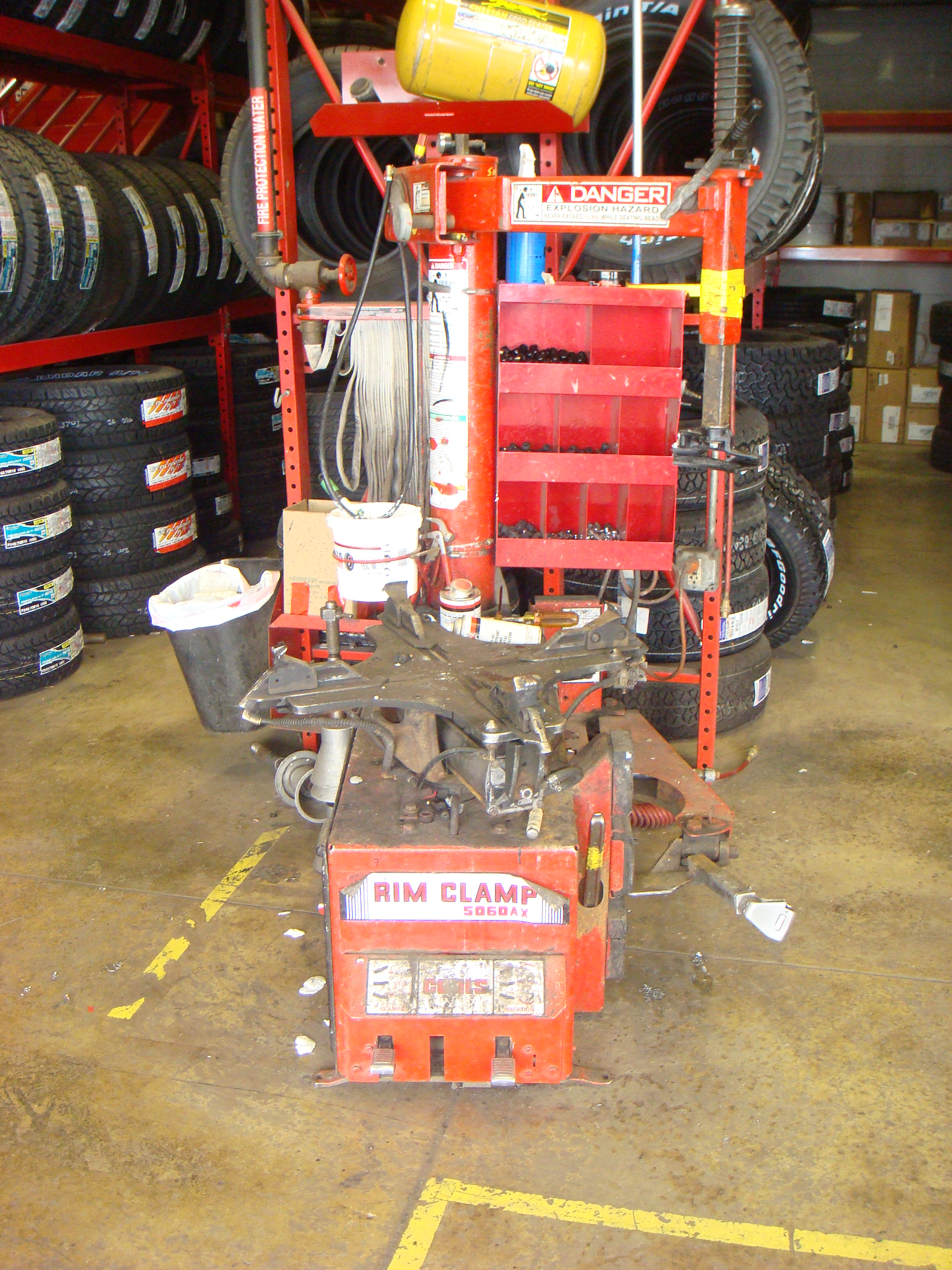
- A tire changer located at a tire specialty store
- Other names: Tire mounter
- Types: Passenger Car & Light Truck, Motorcycle, Heavy Duty
- Manufacturer: Teco Automotive Equipment, COATS, Hunter Engineering Company, Snap-on, Accu-turn, Corghi, Puli
- Model: The above tire changer is the Rim Clamp 5060AX manufactured by COATS.
- Related: Tires, Alloy wheel, Bead breaker

A tire changer is a machine used to help tire technicians dismount and mount tires with automobile wheels. After the wheel and tire assembly are removed from the automobile, the tire changer has all the components necessary to remove and replace the tire from the wheel. Different tire changers allow technicians to replace tires on automobiles, motorcycles and heavy-duty trucks. New tire and wheel technology has improved certain tire changers to be able to change a low profile tire or a run-flat tire.

== Components ==
=== Foot pedals ===
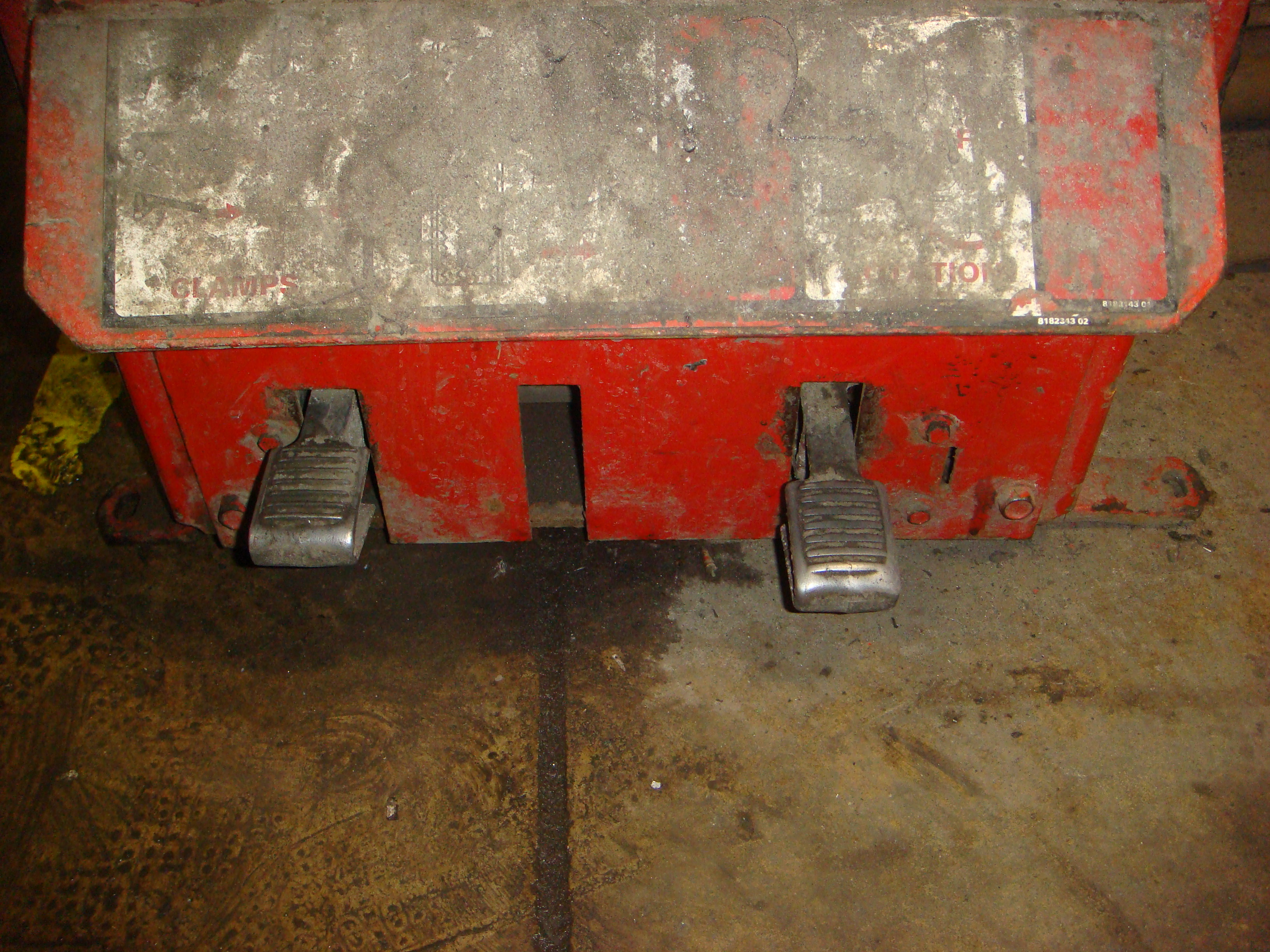
Foot pedals on a tire changer

The tire changer has two foot pedals. The left pedal is called the clamp control pedal, a three position pedal that opens and closes the rim clamps. Once pressed, pneumatic pistons move the 4 rim clamps together or apart simultaneously. The right pedal is the table top pedal, which is a three position pedal that controls the rotation of the table top. When the table top pedal is pressed down, the table top spins clockwise. The table top spins counter clockwise when the pedal is raised.

=== Mount/demount mechanism ===
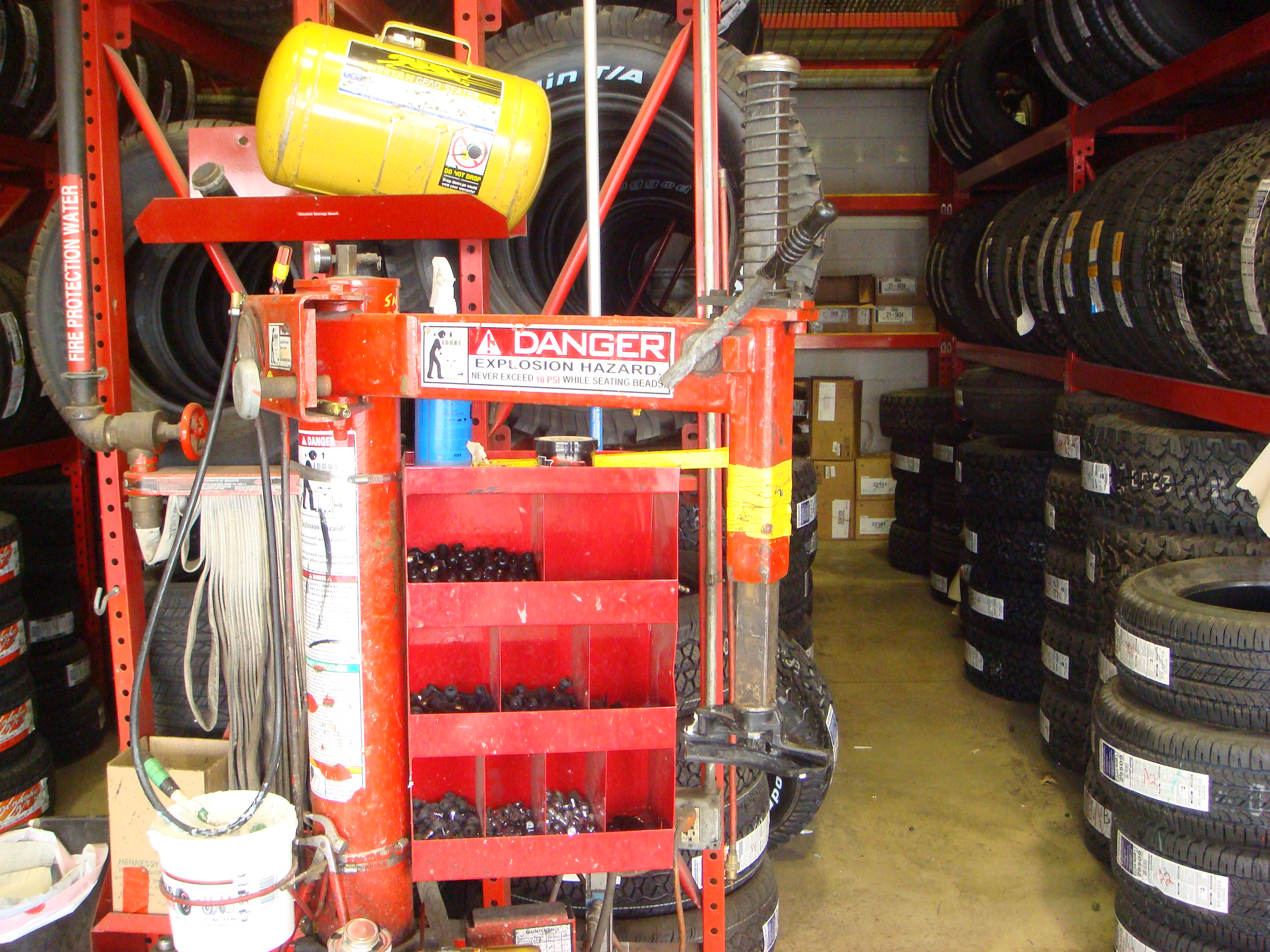
Mount/demount mechanism

The mount/demount mechanism consists of the duckhead, swing arm, and vertical slide. The duckhead is at the bottom end of the vertical slide. The duckhead is uniquely shaped, like a tapered bill, to fit next and surround the rim of a wheel. It can either be made of metal or plastic. The duckhead mounts and demounts the tire from the wheel. The swing arm moves left and right. The purpose of the swing arm is to move the duck head near or away from the rim. The last component of the mount/demount mechanism is the vertical slide. The vertical slide moves up and down so that the duck head can fit onto the rims of different size wheel widths. The vertical slide has a spring and locking handle above the swing arm to set the duckhead and maintain a stable position around the rim.

=== Air pressure system ===
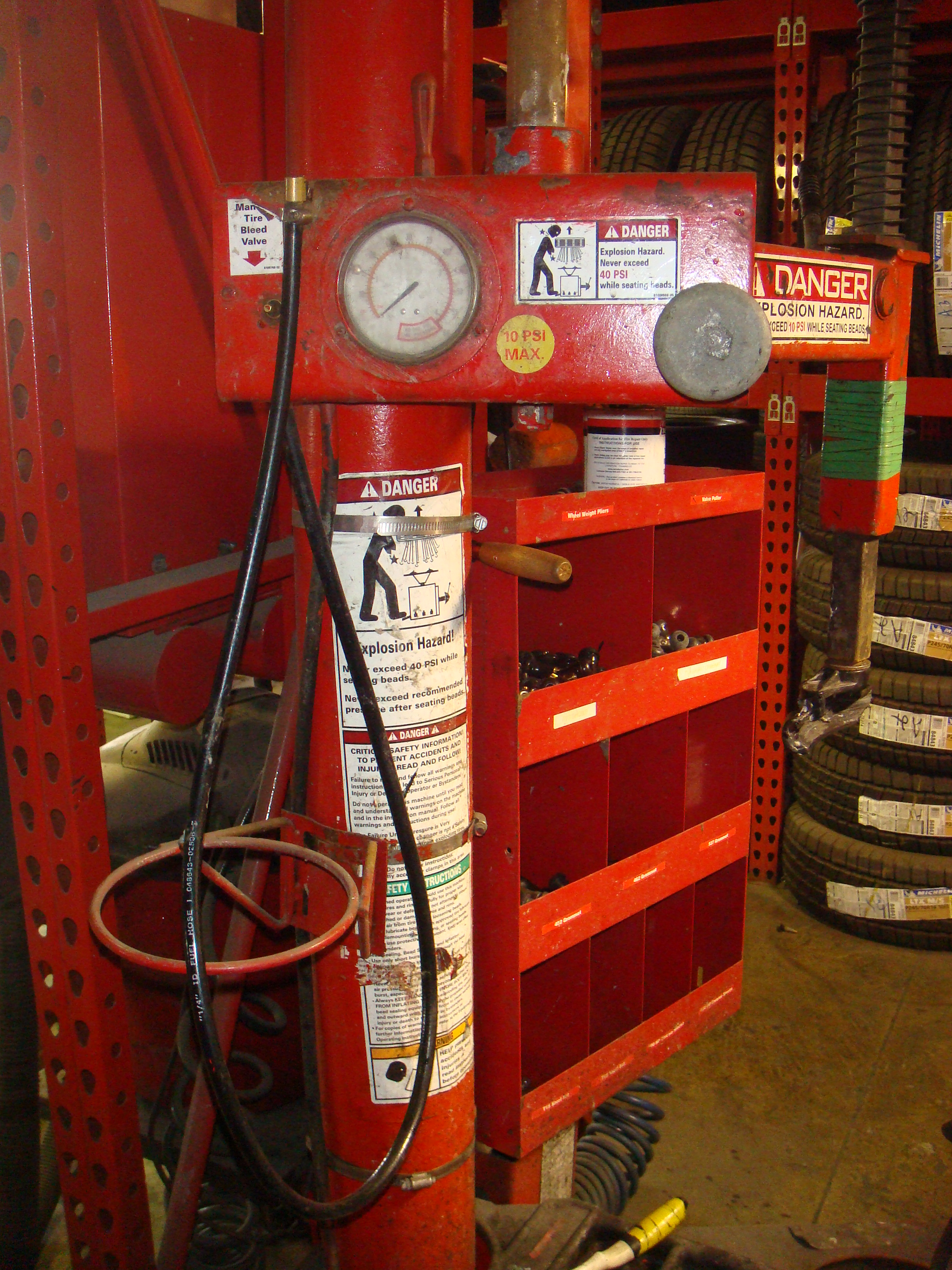
Valve system including air inflation gauge, air hose, and air pressure bleed valve

The air pressure system on a tire changer provides the air to inflate tires mounted on wheels. The air pressure system consists of 4 components: air hose, air inflation gauge, inflation pedal and manual pressure bleed valve. The air hose is located near the top of the tire changer, and it allows compressed air to travel into the tire. A specialized end is used on the air hose to clamp firmly onto valve stems of the wheels. The air inflation gauge displays the air pressure within the tire when the air hose is connected to the valve stem. The air inflation gauge displays the pressure in pounds per square inch (psi). Directly below the air hose on the side of the tire changer is the inflation pedal that enables the inflation of the tire. When the inflation pedal is raised, a burst of air is released from valves next to each rim clamp toward the bottom bead of the tire to help with inflation. The manual bleed valve is located next to the air hose and air inflation gauge. The manual bleed valve allows the manual release of air pressure from tire.

=== Table top and rim clamps ===
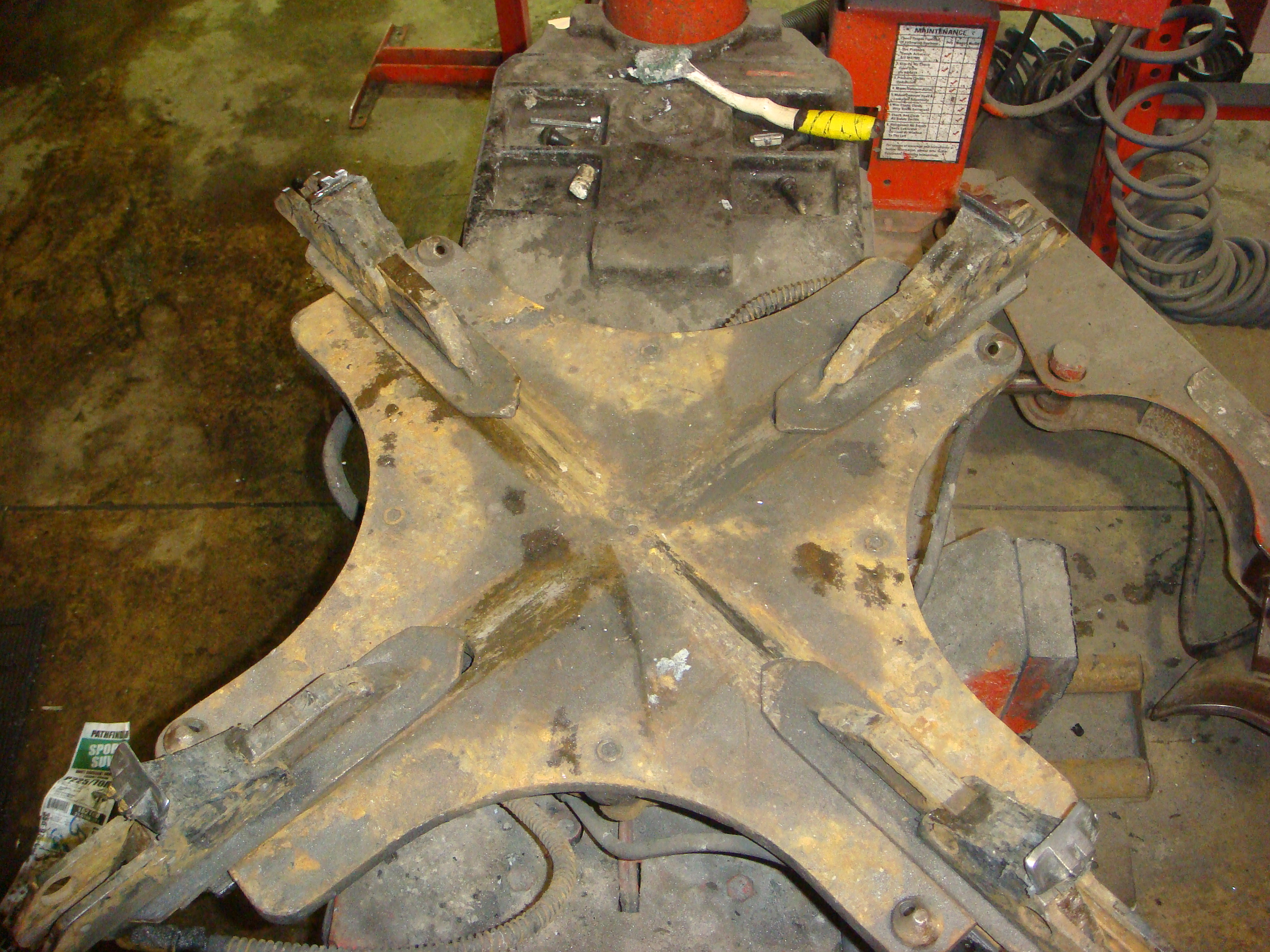
Table top with the rim clamps on each end

The table top and rim clamps hold and rotate the wheel to mount or dismount a tire. The table top is directly above the foot pedals and below the mount/demount mechanism. The table top is able to rotate clockwise and counter clockwise. The table top is shaped as the letter "X", but it can be a circle in different tire changer models. On each end of the table top, there are pneumatic–powered rim clamps. These rim clamps move in unison to secure wheels onto the table top. Each rim clamp can be adjusted closer or further away from the center of the table top to accommodate smaller or larger wheels.

=== Bead loosening system ===
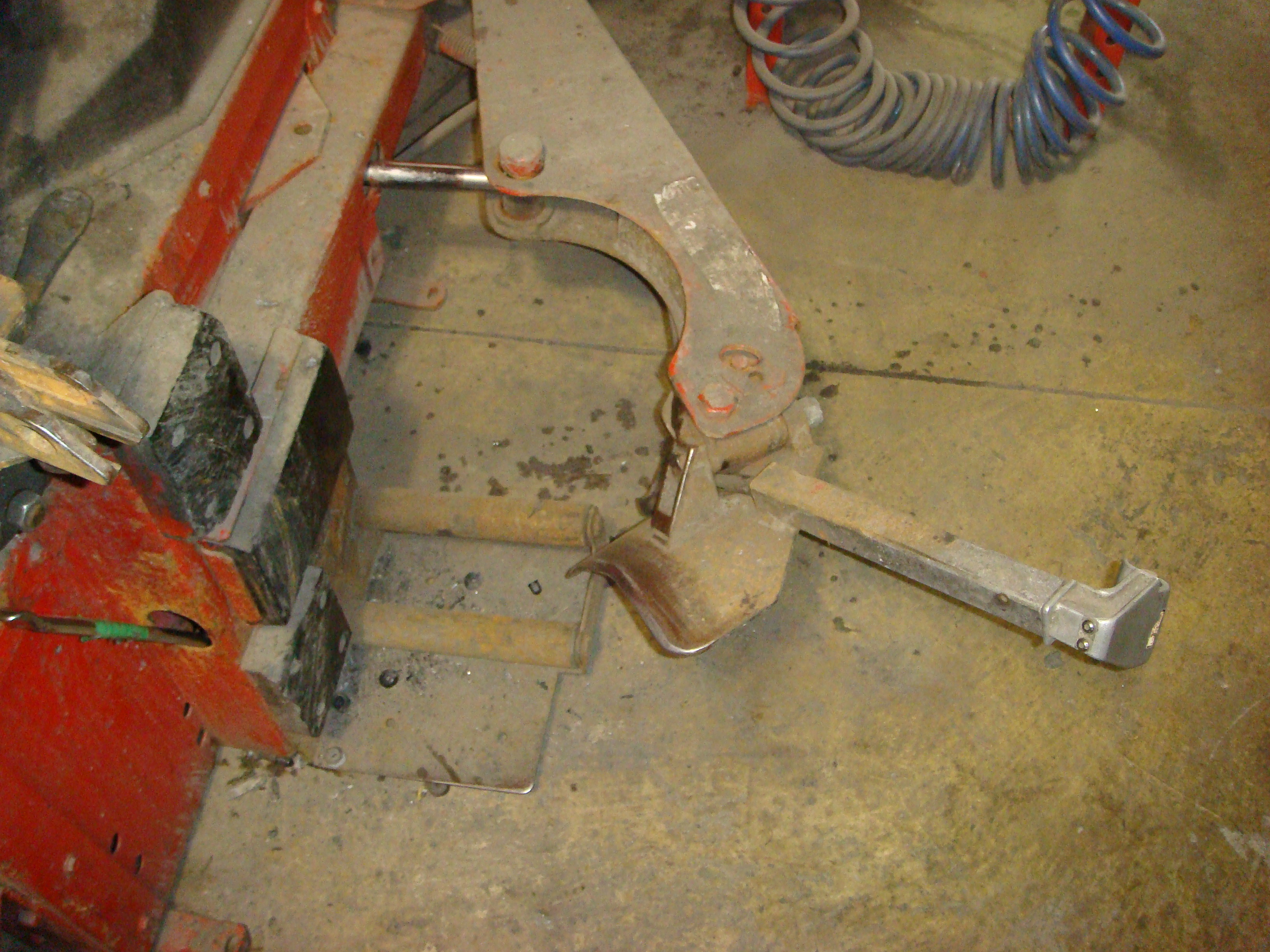
The bead loosener on the right side of a tire changer

The bead loosening system releases the tire bead from the rim of the wheel. The bead loosening system consists of an arm near the bottom right side of the tire changer. There is a shovel shaped metal piece at the end of the arm called the bead loosener shoe. The bead loosener shoe pivots and is rounded to accommodate the shape of a wheel. On top of the arm, there is a handle with a button on top to engage the bead loosening system. Across from the shovel shaped metal piece, there are rubber squares to protect the wheel from scratches during the loosening procedure.

== Tire installation ==
The following list provides an explanation of an operator installing a tire onto a wheel using a tire changer:

1. The operator centers the wheel and securely fastens it onto the table top with the rim clamp mechanism with the narrow bead-ledge up of the wheel.
2. The operator pushes the bottom bead first in the well of the wheel.
3. The operator pushes the top bead down into the center well of the wheel under the duckhead and rotates the table top using the table top pedal.
4. The operator installs a valve core.
5. The operator slowly inflates the tire until the beads "pop" on the bead ledge of the wheel.
6. The operator releases the rim clamps and inflates the tire to manufacturer specifications.

== Other types of tire changers ==
=== Motorcycle ===
Motorcycle tire changers are less sophisticated than passenger car and light truck or heavy-duty tire changers because they deal with smaller and lighter tires and wheels. Motorcycle tire changers mainly provide a simple bead loosening system and rim clamps powered manually. Certain motorcycle tire changers can accommodate wheel diameters as small as 10 inches (250 mm) and wheels at least 1 1/2 inches (38 mm) wide. In addition, small atv wheels and tires are used on motorcycle tire changers.

=== Heavy duty ===
Heavy-duty tire changers require larger equipment because these changers deal with larger, heavier tires and wheels. Heavy-duty tire changers can work with some wheels up to 56 inches (1.4 m) in diameter and tires up to 90.5 inches (2.30 m) in diameter and 43 inches (1.1 m) wide. Heavy-duty tire changers are used for agricultural, off-road and construction vehicles. However, now, bigger versions of the heavy-duty tire changers are designed to mount/demount tires up to 95 inches (2.4 m) in diameter and also feature a hydraulically operated self-centering four-jaw chuck with clamping jaws that can clamp from 14 to 58 inches (0.36 to 1.47 m) either from the wheel’s inside or from the center bore.

=== Semi-automatic and automatic mounting and inflation machines ===
Higher volume producers typically utilize specialized tire and wheel mounting and inflation equipment which is partially or fully automated. Depending on the tire size, machines may be a single station or multistation. In these machines, the tire is inflated using high volume, high pressure compressed air that flows into the tire around the tire bead rather than through the valve stem. When the tire has achieved the desired inflation pressure, the machine's inflation head moves away from the tire and the inflation process is completed.
