= Gas well deliquification =

Technology used to remove water from gas wells

Gas well deliquification, also referred to as "gas well dewatering", is the general term for technologies used to remove water or condensates build-up from producing gas wells.

When natural gas flows to the surface in a producing gas well, the gas carries liquids to the surface if the velocity of the gas is high enough. A high gas velocity results in a mist flow pattern in which liquids are finely dispersed in the gas. Consequently, a low volume of liquid is present in the tubing or production conduit, resulting in a pressure drop caused by gravity acting on the flowing fluids. As the gas velocity in the production tubing drops with time, the velocity of the liquids carried by the gas declines even faster. Flow patterns of liquids on the walls of the conduit cause liquid to accumulate in the bottom of the well, which can either slow or stop gas production altogether.

Possible solutions to this problem include the installation of a velocity string, a capillary string injecting foamers (often with corrosive effects on surface wellhead seals), or a pump to continuously or intermittently pump the water to the surface to remove the hydrostatic barrier that the water creates. A common practice is to use a device called a plunger to lift the liquids. Improved electrical pumps coming onto the market may enhance the effectiveness of the technology. More recently, downhole compressors are being used to increase velocity of gas flow, which in turn accelerates liquid unloading.

The same concept is also applicable to oil wells when they are at the end stage of production. In this case, the reservoir pressure drops to such a low level that it cannot lift the weight of the oil/water column to the surface. By injecting a gas (such as nitrogen) into the wellbore at a specific point, the density of the fluid column can be reduced to the point that the reservoir pressure is once again able to lift fluids to the surface.
