= Pierre Chen =

Taiwanese art collector and businessman

Chen Tai-Min
- 陳泰銘
- Born: 1958 (age 67–68); Madou District, Tainan, Taiwan
- Education: National Cheng Kung University (BS)
- Occupation: Businessman
- Known for: Founder and chairman of Yageo
- Spouse: Divorced
- Children: 3

Chen Tai-Min (Chinese: 陳泰銘; born 1958), also known by his English name Pierre Chen, is a Taiwanese art collector and businessman. He is the founder and chairman of Yageo, which deals with electronic domains and makes electronic components for mobiles, automobiles, laptops and desktops, and key electronic devices. As of May 2024, Forbes estimated his net worth at US$6.1 billion.

== Early life and education ==
Chen was born in Madou District, Tainan, and grew up in Kaoshiung in a middle-class Taiwanese family. After high school, he earned a Bachelor of Science (B.S.) in engineering science from National Cheng Kung University in 1980.

== Career ==
He founded Yageo in 1977.

Chen is the owner of 47 sales offices, 40 manufacturing sites, 20 R&D centers worldwide and was in charge of in Yageo's day-to-day management.

He was listed at 550th in the 2021 Forbes list of world billionaires, and 9th in Taiwan.

== Art and wine collection ==
Chen is well known as an art and wine collector, having collected since 1976.

One of the paintings in his collection is Tamsui, an oil painting by Japanese-period Taiwanese artist Tan Ting-pho. The painting was purchased for $4.5 million (NT$144 million), setting a world record for a ‘NT $100 million’ purchase of an oil painting by an ethnic Chinese artist. Chen's art collection is administered through the Yageo Foundation.

Sotheby's auctioned off 25,000 bottles from his wine collection in 2023 and 2024, including their first ever auction devoted exclusively to Champagne and the first ever single-owner wine auction to take place in Burgundy.

== Personal life ==
He is divorced, with three children, and lives in Taipei, Taiwan.

== See also ==
- Taiwanese art
