= KEMET Corporation =

Industrial Manufacturer

- Company type: Subsidiary
- Industry: Electronics
- Founded: 1919
- Headquarters: Fort Lauderdale, Florida, U.S.
- Products: Capacitors & Electronic Components
- Parent: Yageo Corporation
- Website: www.kemet.com

KEMET Corporation, a subsidiary of Yageo Corporation (TAIEX: 2327), manufactures a broad selection of capacitor technologies such as tantalum, aluminum, multilayer ceramic, film, paper, polymer electrolytic, and supercapacitors. KEMET also manufacturers a variety of other passive electronic components, such as AC line filters, EMI cores and filters, flex suppressors, electro-mechanical devices (relays), metal composite inductors, ferrite products, sensors and transformers/magnetics. The product line consists of nearly 5 million distinct part configurations distinguished by various attributes, such as dielectric (or insulating) material, configuration, encapsulation, capacitance (at various tolerances), voltage, performance characteristics, and packaging.

== History ==
In 1919, KEMET Laboratories was founded by Union Carbide Corporation to capitalize on its purchase of Cooper Research Company of Cleveland, Ohio. Cooper had developed an alloy that could be used in the manufacture of vacuum tube components. The name "KEMET" is derived from the words "chemical" and "metallurgy."

In 1958, KEMET changed its market focus to the tantalum capacitor. In 1969, the company entered the market of ceramic capacitors.

In 1990, KEMET Electronics Corporation was acquired from Union Carbide and after two years, the company went public on the New York Stock Exchange under the symbol KEM. This ended all ties with Union Carbide.

KEMET acquired the tantalum business unit of EPCOS AG in 2007, Evox Rifa Group Oyj and Arcotronics Italia S.p.A. in 2008, Cornell Dubilier Foil, LLC and Niotan Incorporated in 2012.

In 2012, the company completed the acquisition of Cornell Dubilier Foil, LLC and Niotan Incorporated.

In 2017 the company announced the closing of a deal to purchase a controlling share of NEC Tokin. After the purchase by KEMET concludes on April 10, 2017, NEC Tokin will be renamed "TOKIN Corporation".

On November 11, 2019, it was announced that KEMET would be acquired by Yageo of Taiwan. On June 15, 2020, KEMET became a fully owned subsidiary of Yageo.

== Products and services ==
KEMET Electronics Corporation manufacturers capacitors and other components for computing, telecommunications, medical, aerospace, defense, and automotive markets.

== Research and development ==
In January 2014, KEMET introduced the High Voltage-High Temperature (HV-HT) Series in C0G Dielectric, improving the efficiency over competitive high temperature (200 degree) precious metal electrode (PME) and base metal electrode (BME) ceramic capacitor devices. Oct. 2013 KEMET announced the opening of the new aluminum Electrolytic Innovation Center (EIC) in Weymouth, U.K. Products made from this new center include 20 g High Vibration Screw Terminal capacitors and a Low Inductance product line under Film and Electrolytic Business. In fiscal year 2015, KEMET had 33 PhD scientists, of which 17 were focused on technology, and 501 engineers (about one half of which are in manufacturing and the other half in R&D). KEMET was granted a record number of 20 U.S. patents in fiscal year 2015.

== Awards ==
In June 2013, KEMET won the Supplier Excellence Award for the Americas, Asia and Europe by TTI. In 2015, KEMET received the Global Operations Excellence Award from TTI.
