= Bead breaker =

Automotive Tool

A tire bead is held in the groove by air pressure.

A bead breaker is a tool used for separating tires from rims. The innermost diameter of the tire that interfaces with the rim of a wheel is called the tire bead. The bead is a thicker section of rubber, and is reinforced with braided steel cables, called the bead bundle. The surface of the bead creates a seal between the tire and rim on radial and bias-ply tires.

Often, the bead can become stuck to the rim after rusting or corrosion occurs, requiring the use of a bead breaker in order to be removed.

== Usage ==
Tire changers have a semi-automated bead loosening system for removing tires, but due to the high cost and lack of portability, these were not suitable in many cases. In addition, tire beads adhered to rims by heat or rust must often be broken free manually; in these cases, a bead breaker is ideal. Used like a chisel, a bead breaker leverages a mechanical advantage to drive the bead away from the rim.

A need was experienced by 4x4 enthusiasts and overland travellers for a simple tool to effectively and efficiently remove the tire from the rim of a wheel, in the event that a tire requires repairs to its inside. Many vehicles, including ATVs, motorcycles, passenger vehicles, trucks, off-road vehicles, and light aircraft have an additional feature on the rim called the bead retainer, a ridge that prevents the tire bead from slipping inward on the rim and losing the air seal.

On ATVs and UTVs, these bead retainers are substantially large, as their tires are often run at very low air pressures (~5 psi (34 kPa)) and experience severe side loading forces from trail riding. The large bead retainer is necessary to prevent unintentional dislocation of the tire bead from the bead seat. Furthermore, if an ATV tire does lose pressure from a puncture, the large bead retainer will keep the tire in place for low-speed riding, allowing the rider to navigate to the trail head without the tire coming completely off of the rim. While the large bead retainers of ATVs are quite effective at keeping the tire in place during operating conditions, they also prevent tires from being easily changed with normal tools, even in a shop setting.

== Types ==
There are three categories of tire bead breaker designs: the “shoe-and-lever" mechanism, the "plier-type" mechanism, and the "clamp-and-ram" mechanism.

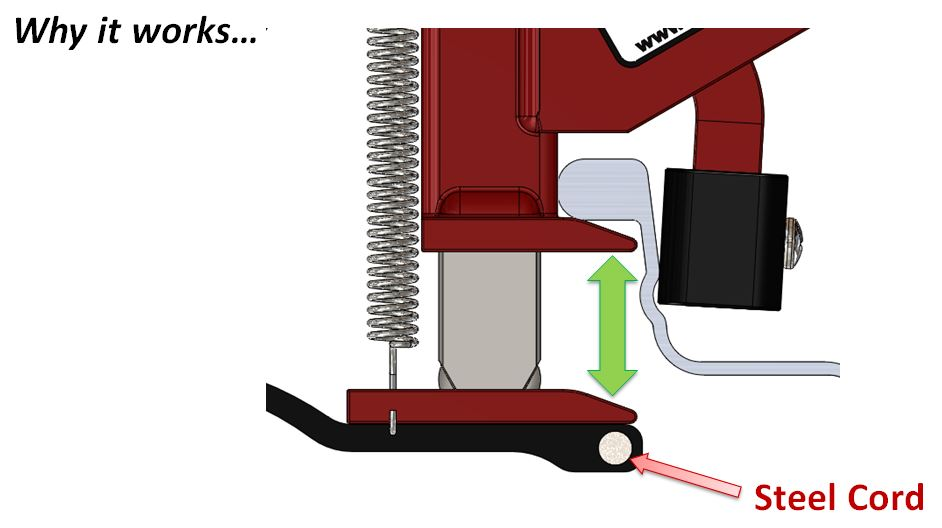
Clamp-and-ram bead breaker

=== Shoe-and-lever-type ===
The shoe-and-lever mechanism performs well on many motorcycle tires, passenger vehicle tires and trailers, but with more difficult tires, it often fails because of the nature of the design. A shoe, operated by a lever, pushes down on the tire sidewall next to the tire bead, and if the bead is stuck, the shoe may slip and press against the middle of the sidewall instead. Furthermore, due to their design (which uses a stand), shoe-and-lever bead breakers are quite large, and thus not a good portable solution for tire changes. These bead breakers are typically inexpensive compared to other designs.

=== Plier-type ===
The plier-type mechanism has a spike that pushes in between the tire bead and lip of the rim, putting a separating force on the bead bundle. However, the pivot point results in an arc that quickly transitions to pushing on the sidewall. Plier-type bead breakers are generally more effective than shoe-and-lever designs, but they have some disadvantages. Such tools must be adjusted for different diameter wheels, and since the metal part of the tool makes contact with the rim, it may scratch aluminum or painted wheels. Some coordination and balance is required, as the user has to stand on the tire and use their body weight to operate the tool. It is fairly large yet portable, and is often used in races for pit stop tire changes. Ultimately, this type of bead breaker also struggles to work reliably on the stubborn tires of ATVs, 4x4 trucks, and tractors. The cost of plier-type bead breakers varies.

=== Clamp-and-ram-type ===
Lastly, the clamp-and-ram mechanism is perhaps the most effective for breaking beads on ATVs, and other difficult-to-change tires, in addition to being fairly compact. This style of tool has a pointed foot that sits on the sidewall and enters the space between the tire bead and lip of the rim, and a padded clamp that screws into position. The ram foot is then actuated by another screw, breaking the bead loose. Because the tool is clamped in place, it cannot slide down the sidewall and damage the tire. Since the ram foot pushes directly on the steel bead bundle of the tire, it works well on old and deteriorated tires.

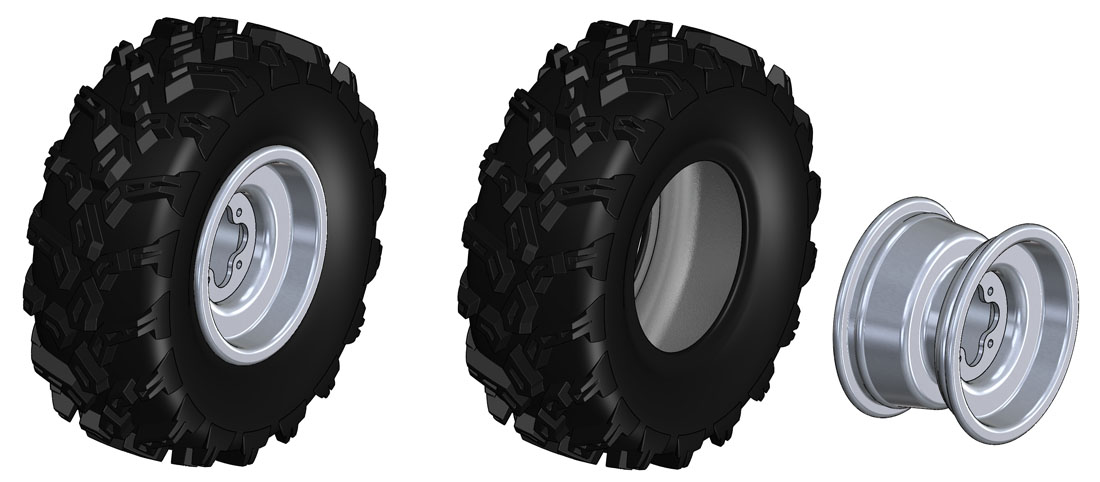
ATV tire and wheel

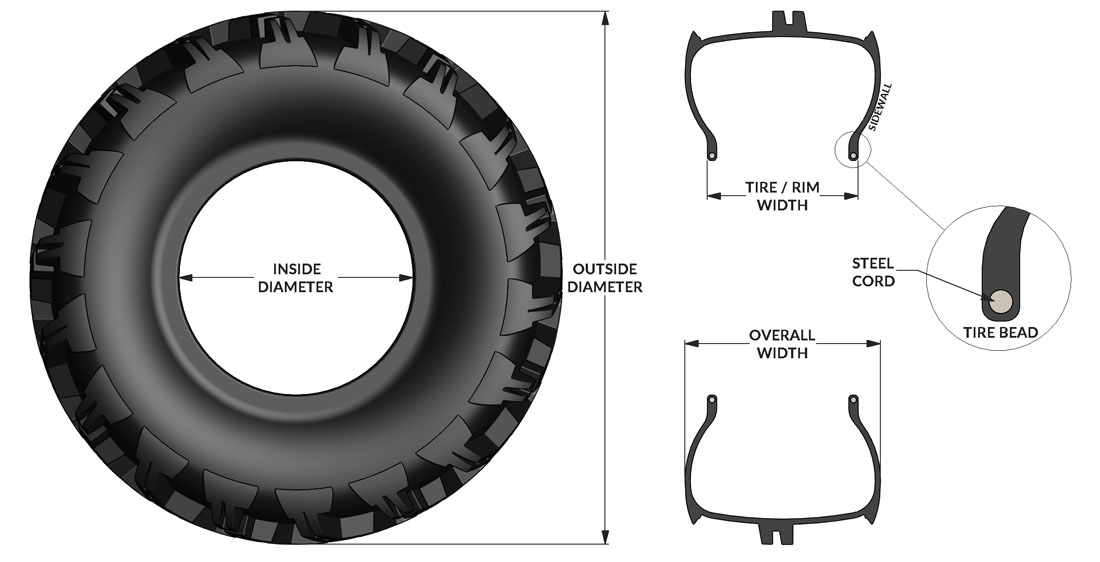
ATV tire

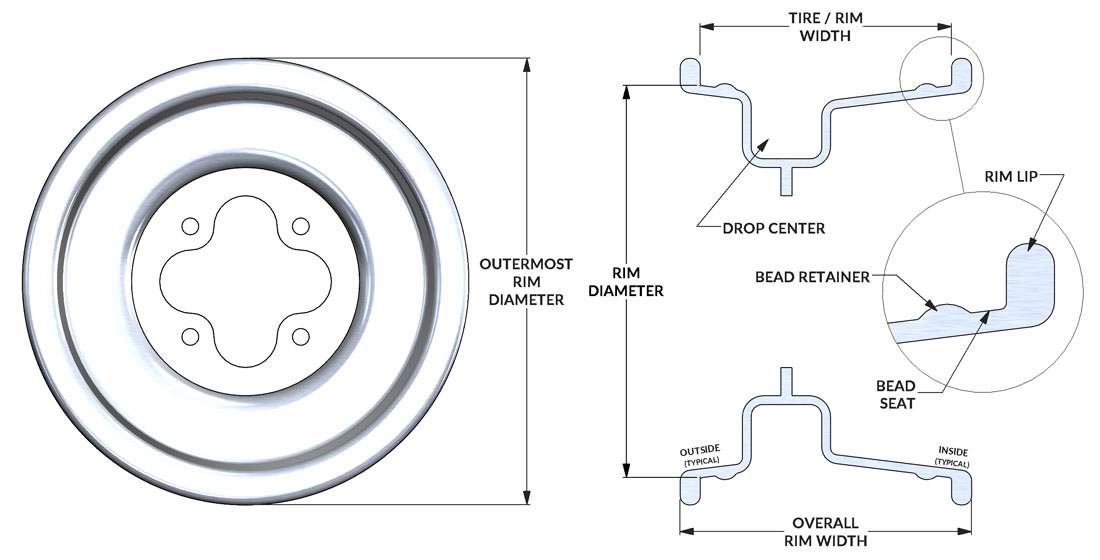
ATV wheel

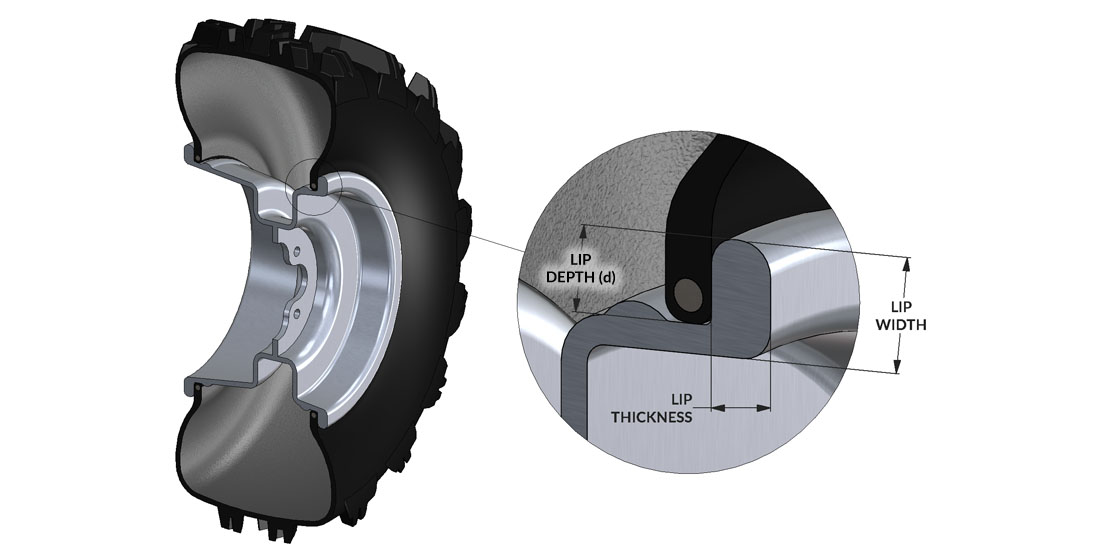
ATV wheel-tire interface
