= Plunger lift =

Method of deliquifying gas wells

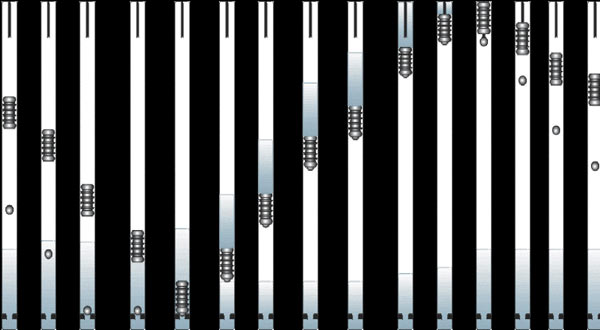
The stages of operation of a plunger lift.

A plunger lift is an artificial lift method of deliquifying a natural gas well. A plunger is used to remove contaminants from productive natural gas wells, such as water (in liquid, mist, or ice forms), sand, oil and wax.

The basics of the plunger is to open and close the well shutoff valve at the optimum times, to bring up the plunger and the contaminants and maximize natural gas production. A well without a deliquification technique will stop flowing or slow down and become a non-productive well, long before a properly deliquified well.

The plunger lift has low energy cost, low environmental impact, low capital investment and low maintenance cost. Modern wellhead controllers offer a variety of criteria to control the plunger. The original controllers were just timers, with fixed open and close cycles.

Measuring the various pressures in the system allows intelligent and reactive control. The pressures often measured are casing, tubing, line, and differential (DP). The other items measured are plunger arrival times, flow rates, temperatures and status of various auxiliary equipment: oil tank level, compressor status.

== Open well criteria ==
- Plunger drop timer - Minimum close time to allow the plunger to reach the bottom.
- Tube - Line pressure
- Casing - Line pressure
- Casing - Tubing pressure
- Load ratio (Casing-tubing) / (Casing - Line)
- Foss and Gaul equation
- Tubing pressure
- Casing pressure
- Static pressure
- External variables

== Close well criteria ==
- Flow time
- After flow timer
- Turner/Coleman flow rate
- Load ratio
- Differential (DP)
- Flow rate
- Tubing - Line pressure
- Casing - Tubing pressure
- Casing pressure
- Static pressure
- Tubing pressure
- Line pressure

== Patents ==
- Pat #1769637 10/20/1925
- Pat #1784096 07/23/1929
- Pat #1896232 11/21/1931
- Pat #2001012 03/21/1934
- Patent SU 171351.Priority 14/11/1963. Bulletin No,16 05/05/1969
- Pat #4150721 01/11/1978
- Pat #5957200 11/18/1997
- Pat #6209637 05/14/1999
- Pat #6467541 08/01/2000
- Pat #7270187 04/29/2003
- Patent RU 2214504. Flying valve, its detachable element and the method of wells operation. Priority 30.04.2002. Bulletin No. 29, 2003.
- FLYING VALVE FOR A FREE PISTON. Pub. No.: WO/2008/060188 International Application No.: PCT/RU2007/000622 Publication Date: 22.05.2008 International Filing Date: 14.11.2007. WIPO. Patentscope.
