= Richard J. Tobin =

American businessman

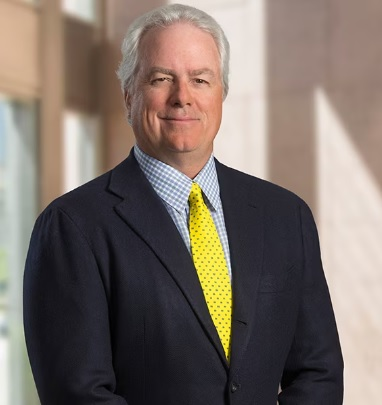
- Richard J. Tobin, CEO of Dover Corporation
- Born: 1963 (age 62–63); Philadelphia, Pennsylvania, United States
- Education: Norwich University (BS); Drexel University (MBA)

Richard Joseph Tobin is an American business executive and is the CEO of Dover Corporation. Previously, he was the CEO of CNH Industrial. He also holds a position as an independent director at KeyCorp.

== Early life and education ==
Richard Tobin obtained a Bachelor of Arts degree from Norwich University (Northfield, Vermont) and received a Master of Business Administration from Drexel University (Philadelphia).

Prior to beginning his business career, Tobin served as an Officer in the United States Army from 1985 to 1989.

== Career ==
He held the role of Chief Financial Officer and Head of Information Technology for SGS SA of Geneva, Switzerland. He also held roles in international marketing and management with the GTE Corporation of Stamford, Connecticut (United States), AluSuisse-Lonza SA of Zürich (Switzerland) and Alcan Aluminum of Montreal (Canada).

Prior to the merger of Fiat Industrial S.p.A. and CNH Global, he was the Chief Executive Officer of CNH Global and group Chief Operating Officer of Fiat Industrial S.p.A., roles he assumed after two years as Chief Financial Officer (CFO) for CNH Global.

Furthermore, Richard Tobin holds the position of Vice Chairman of Turk Traktor ve Ziraat Makineleri AS of Ankara (Turkey), and serves on the Board of Directors for the Dover Corporation of Downers Grove, Illinois. He sits on the U.S. Chamber of Commerce Board of Directors, and is a member of the Business Roundtable.

In 2014, Richard Tobin was mentioned by Fiat Chrysler Automobiles (FCA) Chairman, John Elkann, as one of the managers who could eventually replace Sergio Marchionne as FCA Chief Executive Officer after 2018.

On December 10, 2021, the KeyCorp Board of Directors elected Richard J. Tobin to the Board of Directors.

== See also ==
- CNH Industrial
- Fiat Industrial
- CNH Global
- United States Chamber of Commerce
