= Dover Corporation =

American industrial conglomerate corporation

- Type: Public
- Traded as: NYSE: DOV; S&P 500 component
- Industry: Conglomerate
- Founded: 1955; 71 years ago
- Headquarters: Downers Grove, Illinois, U.S.
- Area served: Worldwide
- Key people: Richard J. Tobin (president, CEO, and chairman); Michael F. Johnston (lead independent director)
- Revenue: ▲US$8.093 billion (2025); ▲US$7.75 billion (2024)
- Operating income: ▲US$1.37 billion (2025); ▼US$1.21 billion (2024)
- Net income: ▼US$1.09 billion (2025); ▲US$2.70 billion (2024)
- Total assets: ▲US$13.42 billion (2025); ▲US$12.5 billion (2024)
- Total equity: ▲US$7.41 billion (2025); ▲US$6.95 billion (2024)
- Number of employees: 24,000 (2025)
- Website: dovercorporation.com

Dover Corporation is an American conglomerate manufacturer of industrial products headquartered in Downers Grove, Illinois. It is a constituent of the S&P 500 index and is listed on the New York Stock Exchange. Dover was ranked 484 in the 2026 Fortune 500.

== History ==
=== Early history ===
Dover Corporation was formed in 1955, when New York City stockbroker George L. Ohrstrom Sr. recruited Fred D. Durham to manage four manufacturing companies that the former had acquired during the 1930s and 1940s. The four original firms were the C. Lee Cook Company, a manufacturer of seals and piston rings for compressors; Rotary Lift, a maker of automotive lifts; W. C. Norris, a producer of sucker rods for oil-well pumping; and Peerless, a maker of space heaters that was divested in 1977. Durham, who had previously owned and led C. Lee Cook, was named Dover's first president. Later that same year, the Dover Corporate offices opened in Washington, D.C., and it was listed on the New York Stock Exchange.

Between 1955 and 1979, Dover acquired 14 companies. A great deal of this acquisition activity served to build the Dover Elevator business. This elevator growth began in 1955, as Dover Elevator split from Rotary Lift and became an independent operating company within Dover. Dover's purchase of the Shepard Warner Elevator Company in 1958 marked the beginning of an effort to grow the elevator business. In 1963, Dover acquired Acme Elevator, Elevator Service, Reddy Elevator Company in 1964 and Hunter-Hayes Elevator Company in 1970. With these purchases, Dover soon became the third largest elevator company in the U.S. and remained so for many years. Dover continued to expand its elevator division throughout the 1960s and 1970s with the purchases of Moody & Rowe, Burch, Turnbull, Burlington, Hammond & Champness, Louisiana Elevator and W.W. Moore. Ultimately, Dover sold its elevator division in 1999 to Thyssen AG for $1.1 billion. Dover Elevator had a pretax operating profit of $93 million in 1997. The sale allowed Dover to focus on building its other businesses and moved ThyssenKrupp Elevator Americas to the number three spot worldwide in the elevator and escalator industry.

=== Acquisitions ===
Dover's acquisition history reaches beyond the elevator industry. With a focus on diversification in the 1960s, such as the acquisition of Ohio Pattern Works & Foundry Company in 1961, came notable purchases of companies that continue to be a significant part of Dover Corporation today. The company was shortened to OPW, and in 1949 one of its engineers, Leonard H. Duerr, invented the automatic shutoff fuel-dispensing nozzle valve.

In 1962, Dover made two notable acquisitions: Detroit Stamping Company, now DE-STA-CO, specializing in the design and manufacturing of clamping, gripping, transferring and robotic tooling; and Alberta Oil Tool, subsequently part of Dover Artificial Lift before its separation from Dover Corp.

1964 marked a significant year, as OPW's former leader Thomas Sutton became president of Dover, and corporate headquarters were relocated to New York City. The 1970s were characterized by Dover's intent to expand beyond its principle industries of building materials, equipment and industrial components. A result of this effort included the acquisition of Dieterich Standard, which manufactured liquid-measurement instruments and whose president, Gary Roubos, went on to become Dover's chief operating officer (COO) and president in 1977. Later, Roubos became Dover's chief executive officer (CEO) in 1981.

Another significant acquisition included Sargent Industries, a manufacturer of control devices for aerospace and industrial end-markets, purchased in 1984 for $68 million.

In the 1980s, Dover also began to focus more on electronics. This period was marked by the acquisitions of K&L Microwave in 1983, Dielectric Laboratories in 1985 and NURAD in 1986. Dover later chose to spin off DOVatron in 1993 to shareholders, as the company specialized in circuit-board assembly and had become a source of competition for Dover customers. That same year, Dover acquired Phoenix Refrigeration Systems, which then acquired Hill Refrigeration in 1994 to form Hillphoenix. Also in 1994, Dover's COO and President, Thomas Reece, became CEO of the company. The following year, Dover purchased an 88% interest in the French company Imaje Printing Products for $200 million; this acquisition marks the largest in Dover's corporate history. In 2006, Dover acquired Markem Corporation which specializes in identification. In 2007, the companies merged and were renamed Markem-Imaje, and have since focused on product coding, labeling, traceability and identification.

=== 2000s ===
While Dover acquired more than seventy companies between 1998 and 2002, the company's acquisition rate slowed in the early 2000s. Dover sold eight companies in 2001 for a total of $400 million. The early 2000s also marked a leadership change: Ronald Hoffman, Dover's vice president, and former president and CEO of Dover Resources, become president and COO of Dover Corporation in 2003. In 2005, he was appointed to the position of CEO.

In 2008, Robert Livingston was appointed Dover's new CEO and president. In 2010, Dover moved its corporate headquarters from New York City to the Chicago area.

From 2008 to 2012, Dover acquired almost twenty-five companies. Inpro/Seal, a producer of bearing isolators, was purchased by Waukesha Bearings Corporation in 2009, which included 150,991 shares of Dover's common stock being issued to Inpro/Seal shareholders. In 2010, KMC Inc. and Bearings Plus Inc. were acquired by Waukesha Bearings Corporation. In addition, between 2008 and 2010, Dover spent approximately $436 million to purchase a total of sixteen businesses, while only $100 million was earned from the sale of eight businesses. In 2012, Dover acquired Anthony International for $602.5 million.

In 2011, Dover acquired Sound Solutions, a manufacturer of dynamic speakers and receivers for mobile phones and other consumer electronics, for $855 million. Dover had acquired Knowles, a designer and manufacturer of hearing-aid technology and other acoustical componentry, six years earlier for $750 million. Sound Solutions and Knowles gave Dover the necessary scale to develop items for the rapidly evolving mobile-electronics industry. In 2014, Dover spun off Knowles.

In 2015, Dover sold Sargent Aerospace & Defense to RBC Bearings.

In 2016, Dover acquired Ravaglioli S.p.A..

In May 2018, Richard J. Tobin took over as president and CEO of Dover, after previously serving as the company's director. In May 2018, Dover spun off a large portion of its Energy segment including upstream energy businesses into a standalone publicly traded company, Apergy.

In February 2024, Dover appointed its president and CEO, Richard J. Tobin, to the additional role of Chairman of the Board. Later that year, the company completed sales of two of its operating divisions. German firm Stabilus purchased DESTACO for $680 million in a transaction announced in October 2023 and closed in April 2024, while Terex acquired the Environmental Solutions Group division for $2 billion in a deal announced in July and closed in October.

== See also ==
- List of conglomerates in the United States
- Gilbarco Veeder-Root
