= Yageo =

Taiwan-based electronic component manufacturing company

YAGEO Corporation
- Traded as: TWSE: 2327
- Industry: Electronics
- Founded: 1977; 49 years ago
- Products: Electronic Components
- Website: www.yageo.com

YAGEO Corporation (Chinese: 國巨公司) is a Taiwanese electronic component manufacturing company, founded in 1977 by Pierre Chen. The company specializes in passive devices — resistors, capacitors and inductors. In January 2020, they were the third largest passive component manufacturer in the world.

YAGEO specializes in surface-mount components (components that use surface-mount technology).

== History ==
In 1994, YAGEO acquired Singapore-based ASJ.

In 1996, YAGEO acquired Vitrohm, which had been founded in Denmark in 1933, and fellow Taiwanese company Teapo.

In 1997, YAGEO acquired another Taiwanese company, Chilisin.

In 2000, the company acquired the "Phycomp" and "Ferroxcube" brand names from Philips Electronics NV.

In 2002, YAGEO acquired Stellar, Inc.

In September 2018, YAGEO acquired BrightKing, a protective component company.

In December 2018, YAGEO completed the acquisition of Pulse Electronics, a wireless/power/advanced components company headquartered in San Diego, US.

In November 2019, it was announced that YAGEO would acquire KEMET Corporation.

In December 2019, YAGEO signed a letter of intent with Southern Taiwan Science Park to build an additional production line in Kaohsiung’s Ciaotou District.

In January 2020, YAGEO announced plans to move approximately US$332.37 million in cash held offshore to Taiwan to boost capacity and research and development projects.

In June 2020, YAGEO and KEMET completed merger.

In January 2022, the YAGEO group acquired Chilisin Electronics Corporation, merging Chilisin and its subsidiary brands Mag.Layers, Magic & Bothhand into Pulse Electronics. The brands Chilisin, Mag.Layers, Magic and Bothhand will be retired, and products rebranded under Pulse Electronics.

In October 2022, the company agreed to buy German maker of industrial and automotive temperature sensors, Heraeus Nexensos GmbH, for about US$78 million. That same month, it also announced its intent to acquire Schneider Electric's Telemecanique Sensors for US$729 million in cash.

== See also ==
- List of companies of Taiwan
