= Tire bead =

Term for the edge of a tire that sits on the rim

A tire bead is held in the groove by air pressure.

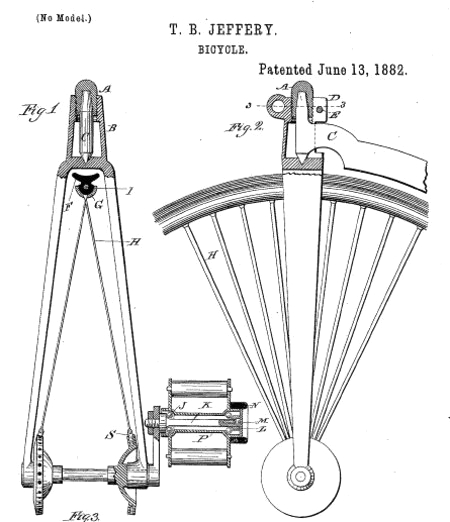
Thomas B. Jeffery's clincher tire patent.

Tire bead is the term for the edge of a tire that sits on the rim. Wheels for automobiles, bicycles, etc. are made with a small slot or groove into which the tire bead sits. When the tire is properly inflated, the air pressure within the tire keeps the bead in this groove.

Reducing tire air pressure is a frequent practice among off-road vehicle drivers. This action widens the tire tread, enhancing the contact surface with the terrain for better traction. However, excessively low pressure can lead to inadequate bead-to-rim pressure, resulting in the bead dislodging from the rim, commonly known as "losing a bead." To address this issue, beadlocks are frequently employed to securely clamp the bead onto the rim.

A rusty bead can seize onto the rim, requiring a bead breaker to free it.

Tire beads are made of high-tensile steel cable coated with rubber and are responsible for creating and maintaining a seal between the tire and the wheel. The steel wire used to make tire beads is often plated with copper, brass, or bronze to increase its strength.
