= Batch coding machine =

Batch printing machines, marking machines, and date printing machines are used in the following applications:

- Printing batch numbers, manufacturing date, expiration date, retail price, and other information on their plain or laminated and varnished labels, cartons, polypack bags, pouches, tin bottoms, cotton bags, bottles, jars or any solid surfaces.
- Adding special information at the time of packing.
- Adding price change or special offer on existing labels or cartons.

== Types of machine ==
Batch coding machines are categorized in the following two categories:

- Contact coding type
- Non contact coding type

These coding machines are further sub categorized into the following types depending on their mode of operation:

- Automatic

Once set, works automatically with the operator only having to look after its working and settings. Feeding, printing, collecting operation are done automatically, however these features vary in the different makes of machines.

- Semi-automatic

The machine works on its own but the feeding and collecting has to be done by hand.

- Hand operated or manual

Feeding as well as the machine are operated manually. They are suitable for small production and are highly portable.

- Online

These machine works automatically online with other machines or they can be of continuous type with feeding from other machine, by hand or other feeding mechanisms, but are integrated or attached in line with other online machines.

== Contact coding type ==
These machines print or mark on products by contacting the product surface. They mostly use some letters made up of metal or rubber and ink media like liquid ink or a ribbon or solid ink etc. to make an impression. The letters are made offset, so while printing they give mirror image and straight print is obtained.

== Non contact coding type ==
These machine do not comes in contact in any way while printing or marking on products. Normally these machine uses beams/spray to mark. These beams may be emanating from laser, or the spray of ink as with a continuous inkjet (CIJ) printer, the most important factor is that the product or machine should be moving at constant speed.

The moving product are sensed by a sensor and give a signal to the machine which responds immediately with the printing. These machine also work as online machines. A few machines in this category are Inkjet printer, Laser printer, industrial Inkjet coding machine, laser marking systems.
