= Sheldon Brown (bicycle mechanic) =

American cyclist, writer and mechanic

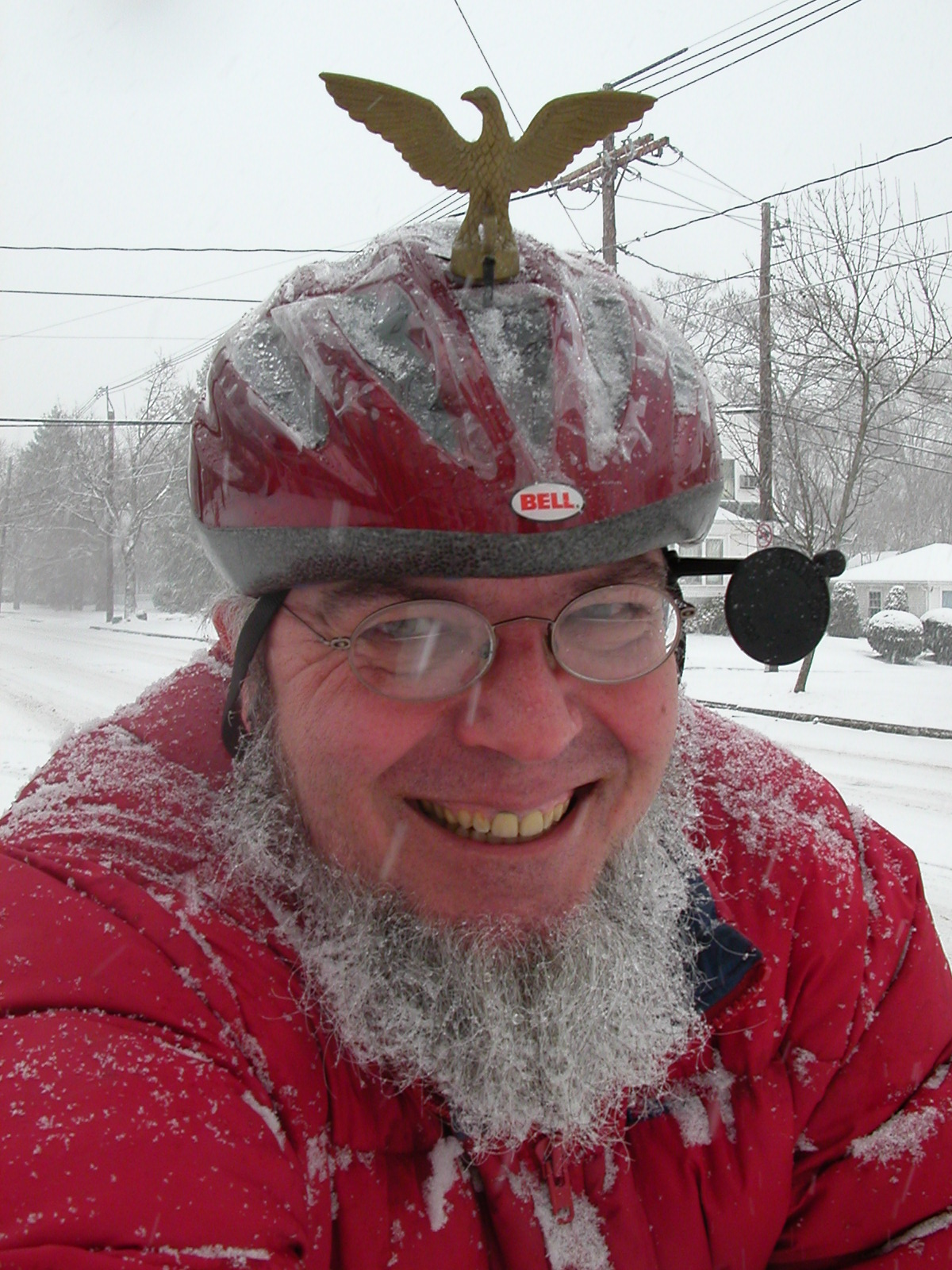
- Brown, icebiking
- Born: July 14, 1944; Boston, Massachusetts, US
- Died: February 4, 2008 (aged 63); Newton, Massachusetts, US
- Other names: Christopher Joyce (pen name); Carapace Completed Umber (alter ego)
- Occupations: bicycle mechanic; technical expert; author
- Employer: Harris Cyclery
- Spouse: Harriet Fell
- Children: 2
- Website: http://sheldonbrown.com/

Sheldon Brown (July 14, 1944 – February 4, 2008) was an American bicycle mechanic, technical expert, and author. He contributed to print and online sources related to bicycling and bicycle mechanics, in particular the web site Sheldon Brown's Bicycle Technical Info. His knowledge of bicycles was described as "encyclopaedic" by The Times of London.

== Background ==
Brown was the parts manager, webmaster and technical consultant of Harris Cyclery, a bike shop in West Newton, Massachusetts, as well as an enthusiast of vintage and classic bicycles in addition to cycling in general. Brown maintained Sheldon Brown's Bicycle Technical Info, a website highlighting a broad range of cycling subjects ranging from how to fix a bicycle flat tire to details on Raleigh and English three-speed bicycles, Sturmey-Archer hubs, tandems, and fixed-gear bicycles. He repaired cameras and was an amateur photographer. His site features his photographic work.

Brown maintained an English-French cycling dictionary, having lived and cycled in France and written about his family's travels in France.

Brown was an atheist.

=== Online ===
Brown's website, developed with Harris Cyclery, includes a deeply knowledgeable and accessible database of technical bicycle information. In particular a wide selection of knowledge of common bicycles from the second half of the 20th century that use non-standard parts. The site remains current as of 2026, maintained by his widow, Harriet Fell, a Computer Science Professor at Northeastern University, and his friend John Allen, "a nationally recognized bicycling expert who helped found the Cambridge Bicycle Committee." Up until 2021, the commercial pages were maintained and updated by Harris Cyclery employees, but Harris Cyclery closed in 2021 due to economic pressures and supply chain shortages. Brown maintained the site's glossary of bicycling terminology, online guide to wheelbuilding, as well as the mirror sites of the technical work of Damon Rinard, Jobst Brandt, and others. Brown had also participated in online cycling forums such as rec.bicycles.tech newsgroup and bikeforums.net.

Brown was a proponent of fixed-gear, single-speed bicycles for ordinary street use. Brown, with Galen Evans and Osman Isvan, developed a method to determine and compare bicycle gear ratios. For any combination of front chainring, rear cog, wheel size and crank length, his method results in a number that Brown terms the "gain ratio". Also, Brown expressed opinions on chain cleaning, lubrication and wear, a source of controversy in the field of bicycle maintenance.

In addition to the wide array of bike mechanics and repair articles, Brown's website also contains sections on family cycling, touring, a bike humor section, as well as essays and fiction about cycling. His humorous online articles frequently appeared on April 1.

== Final years and death ==
After developing nerve deterioration over the last years of his life, Brown lost his ability to ride an upright bicycle and continued riding with a recumbent tricycle. In August 2007, Brown was diagnosed with primary progressive multiple sclerosis. He died on February 4, 2008, in Newton, Massachusetts, after a heart attack.

== Print publications, awards, and citations ==
Brown was a contributing writer for Bike World magazine (USA) and for Bicycling magazine (USA), and then for the trade magazine American Bicyclist. Brown wrote the "Mechanical Advantage" column for Adventure Cyclist, the magazine of the Adventure Cycling Association, "from 1997 through 2007."

In October 2003, Brown was awarded a certificate of commendation for his contribution to cycling by the UK's Cyclists' Touring Club (CTC). Brown received the Classic Rendezvous Vintage Bicycle Award in 2005. MassBike presented Brown the Influence Pedaler Award posthumously in 2008.

CTC's Chris Juden mentioned Brown's site in his response to a letter to the editor email, and Lennard Zinn, technical editor for VeloNews, cited Brown in his regular Technical FAQ with Lennard Zinn column. Frank Berto cites Brown's writing in The Dancing Chain, published by Van der Plas Publications, and Zack Furness cites Brown's writing in One Less Car: Bicycling and the Politics of Automobility, published by Temple University Press.
