= The Bicycle Wheel =

- First edition
- Author: Jobst Brandt
- Language: English
- Published: 1981
- Publication place: United States
- Media type: Print
- Pages: 150
- ISBN: 0-9607236-2-5

The Bicycle Wheel is a treatise on wheelbuilding by Jobst Brandt first published in 1981.

== Overview ==
The Bicycle Wheel is an educational book that explains the structural theory of a wire wheel, and teaches the practical methodology of building bicycle wheels.

The book is made up of three parts. Part one, "Theory of the Spoked Wheel", examines how a wire wheel supports various loads, what causes wheel failure, what aspects of a wheel confer strength and durability, discusses each of the individual components that make up a spoked wheel, and examines wheel design. Part two, "Building and Repairing Wheels", explains how to select components, how to build a wheel, and how to repair various forms of damage. Part three, "Equations and Tests", provides a mathematical analysis of spoked wheels.

== Reception ==
The Bicycle Wheel is considered by many to be the premier resource on building bicycle wheels. Noted bicycle mechanic and technical expert Sheldon Brown called it "the near-definitive text on the theory and practice of building spoked bicycle wheels".
