= Jobst Brandt =

American bicycle racer (1935–2015)

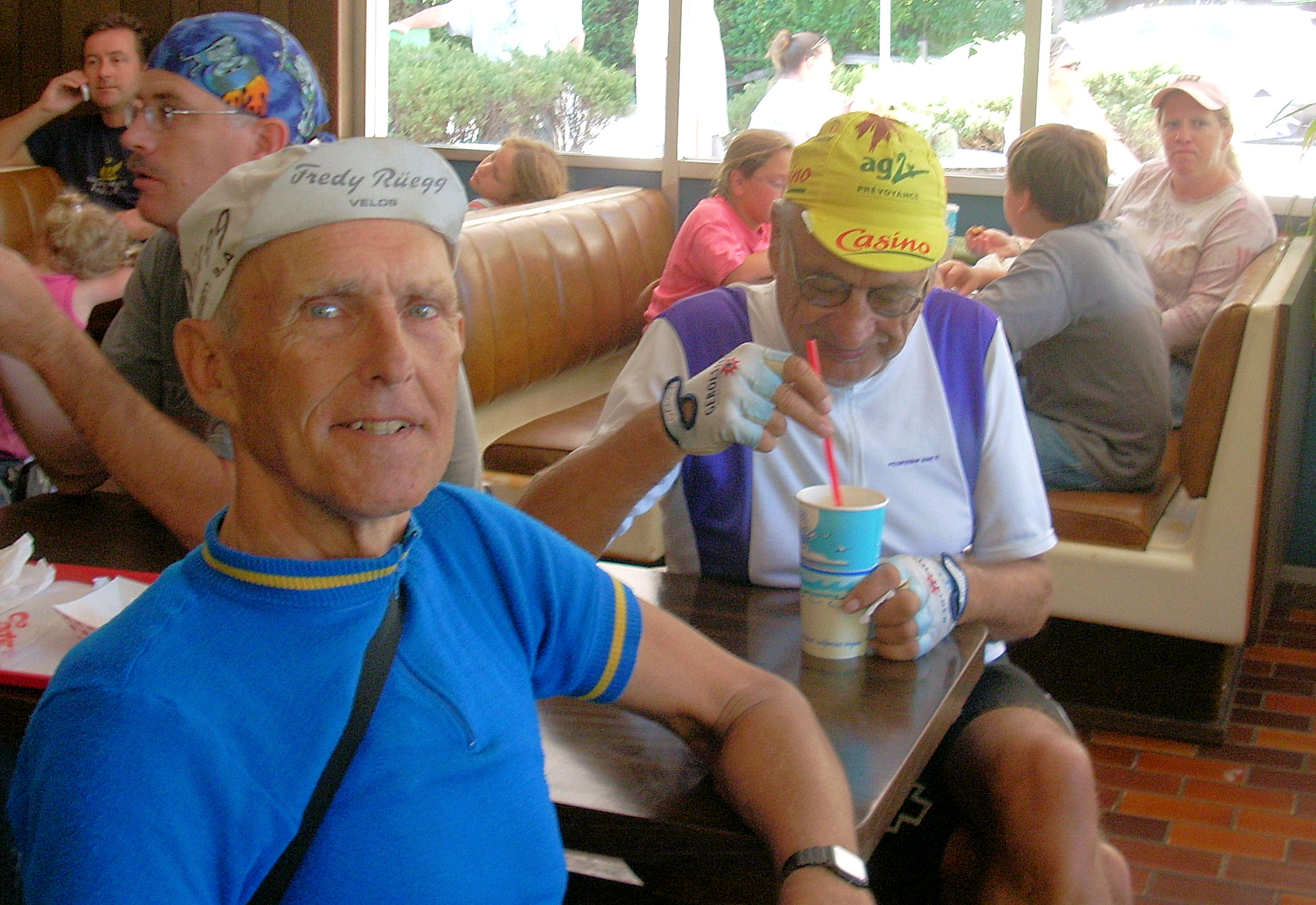
- Jobst Brandt (front) in 2008
- Born: January 14, 1935; New York City
- Died: May 5, 2015 (aged 80)
- Notable work: The Bicycle Wheel
- Father: Karl Brandt

Jobst Brandt (January 14, 1935 – May 5, 2015) was an American mechanical engineer, inventor, bicycle enthusiast, educator, and author.

== Early life ==
Brandt was born in New York City, where his father, the German-born agricultural economist Karl Brandt, was a professor at the New School for Social Research. The family moved to Palo Alto in 1938. Jobst Brandt studied mechanical engineering at Stanford University, graduating in 1958. After two years of military service in the US Army Corps of Engineers, stationed near Frankfurt, Germany, he found employment at Porsche. His subsequent employers included Hewlett Packard, SLAC National Accelerator Laboratory, and Avocet, a bicycle accessories brand. At Avocet, he was involved in the development of a cyclocomputer (patent 6,134,508), touring shoes (patent 4,547,983), and a high-performance bicycle tire, and published The Bicycle Wheel, a unique treatise on wheelbuilding, which became a best-seller.

== Legacy ==
From the late 1980s until the early/mid 2000s, the era of the Usenet newsgroup, Jobst Brandt was a contributor to rec.bicycles.tech and other public forums. His explanations and opinions on bicycle technology, as well as the detailed descriptions of his bike holidays in the Alps and one-day rides in the Santa Cruz Mountains, brought him a wide readership among avid bicyclists beyond the Bay Area, in the online community.
