= Steve Furness =

American football player and coach (1950–2000)

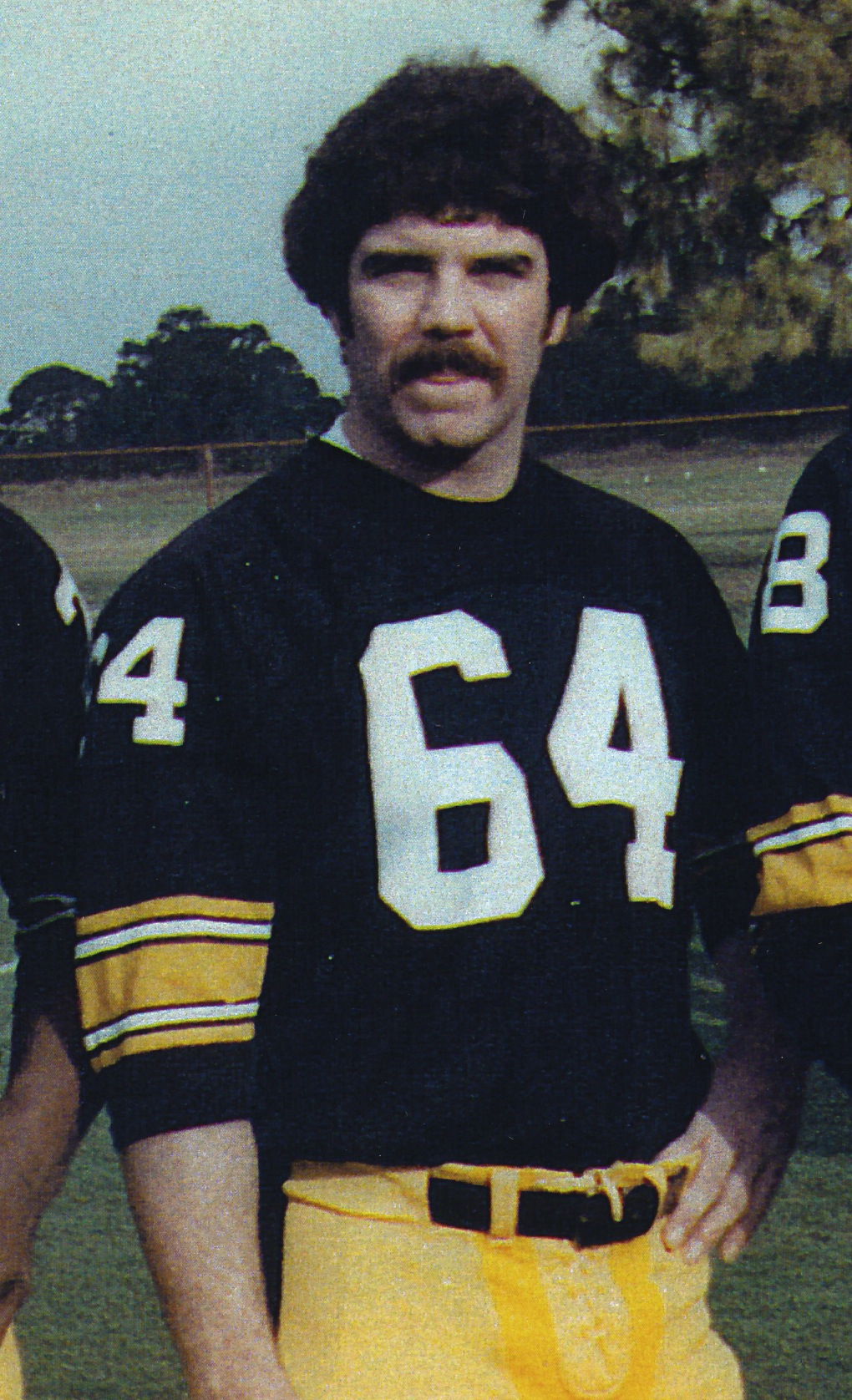
- Furness with the Pittsburgh Steelers in 1977

No. 64
- Positions: Defensive tackle, Defensive end

Personal information
- Born: December 5, 1950; Providence, Rhode Island, U.S.
- Died: February 9, 2000 (aged 49); Pittsburgh, Pennsylvania, U.S.
- Listed height: 6 ft 4 in (1.93 m)
- Listed weight: 255 lb (116 kg)

Career information
- High school: Bishop Hendricken (Warwick, Rhode Island)
- College: Rhode Island
- NFL draft: 1972: 5th round, 113th overall pick

Career history

Playing
- 1972–1980: Pittsburgh Steelers
- 1981: Detroit Lions

Coaching
- 1982–1990: Michigan State; Defensive line coach
- 1991: Indianapolis Colts; Defensive line coach
- 1992–1993: Pittsburgh Steelers; Defensive line coach

Awards and highlights
- 4× Super Bowl champion (as player) — IX (1974), X (1975), XIII (1978), XIV (1979); 2× Big 10 champion (as coach) — 1987 (Mich. St.), 1990 (Mich. St.); Univ. of Rhode Island Athletic Hall of Fame (1987)

Career NFL statistics
- Games played: 106
- Fumble recoveries: 8
- Stats at Pro Football Reference

Stephen Robert Furness (December 5, 1950 – February 9, 2000), nicknamed Buckethead, Furny, was an American professional football defensive tackle for the Pittsburgh Steelers and Detroit Lions of the National Football League (NFL), and a member of the Steelers' famed Steel Curtain defense. He earned four Super Bowl rings as a member of the Steelers. He was of English and Armenian descent. He converted to Judaism.

Furness grew up in Warwick, Rhode Island, where he attended Bishop Hendricken High School before accepting a football scholarship to the University of Rhode Island. In addition to being a star football player for URI, he excelled at the hammer throw and turned down an invitation to the 1972 Olympic Trials to attend the Steelers' training camp. Furness was selected in the fifth round of the 1972 NFL draft. He initially served as a backup to Joe Greene and Ernie Holmes before replacing Holmes as defensive tackle in 1977. He started in Super Bowl XIII and was primarily known for his skills as a pass rusher, leading the team in quarterback sacks during several seasons with the Steelers. He collected 32 sacks over the course of his Steelers career. He was also an avid weight lifter and placed fourth in the 1980 'Strongest Man in Football' competition, which aired on CBS.

Furness was released by Pittsburgh after playing all 16 games in the 1980 season and he ended his playing career in 1981 with the Detroit Lions. After retiring from the NFL he became the defensive line coach for Michigan State from 1982 to 1990, where he worked under his former Steelers defensive coordinator George Perles and helped lead the team to two Big 10 Conference titles, a victory in the 1988 Rose Bowl and appearances in five additional bowl games. During this period he earned a master's degree in Athletic Administration from Michigan State University and was inducted to the University of Rhode Island Athletic Hall of Fame in 1987. He rejoined the NFL in 1991 as an assistant coach for the Indianapolis Colts before returning to the Steelers for his final two years as a defensive line coach (1992–1993). In 1999, he was named as one of the "50 Greatest Rhode Island Sports Figures" of the 20th Century by Sports Illustrated magazine, earning the 14th spot on the list.

Furness died unexpectedly of a heart attack on February 9, 2000. His son Zack Furness is a professor at Penn State University.
