= Karl Brandt (economist) =

American economist (1899–1975)

Karl Brandt (January 9, 1899 – July 8, 1975) was a German-American agricultural economist.

Brandt was born in Essen. He fled from Germany to the U.S. in 1933, shortly after the Nazi regime came to power. He was successively a professor and researcher at the New School for Social Research, the American Institute for Food Distribution, and Stanford University (where he was affiliated with the Hoover Institution).

Brandt was one of the founding members of the Mont Pelerin Society in 1947.
