= Zack Furness =

American academic (born 1977)

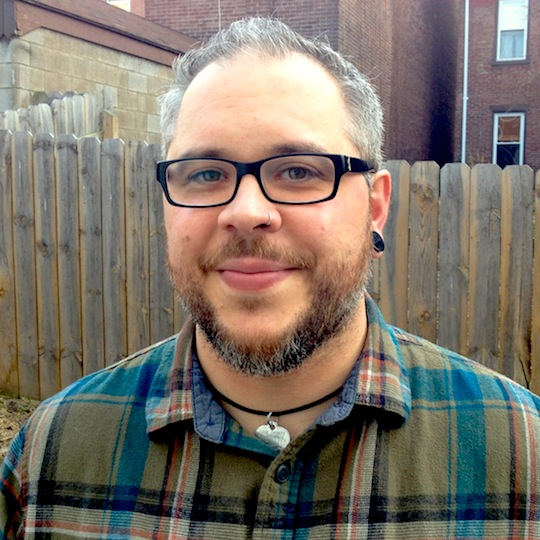
- Born: 1977 (age 48–49); Pittsburgh, Pennsylvania, U.S.
- Education: Pittsburgh, Penn State
- Occupation: Professor of Communications
- Relatives: Steve Furness (father)
- Writing career
- Notable works: One Less Car: Bicycling and the Politics of Automobility

Zachary Mooradian Furness (born 1977) is an American cultural studies scholar, punk musician and author.

== Biography ==
Born in 1977 in Pittsburgh, Furness earned a bachelor's degree in English from Pennsylvania State University, a master's degree and doctorate in Communication studies from the University of Pittsburgh, as well as a doctoral certificate in Women's Studies. He is currently associate professor of communications at Penn State Greater Allegheny where he also serves as Communications Program Coordinator and the WMKP Radio General Manager. Prior to working at Penn State, Furness taught in the Cultural Studies program at Columbia College Chicago and in the Speech Communication department at Shoreline Community College. He is an interdisciplinary researcher and possibly best known for his book One Less Car: Bicycling and the Politics of Automobility. In addition to his work on cycling advocacy and bicycle culture, Furness is the editor of Punkademics, the co-editor (with Thomas Oates) of The NFL: Critical and Cultural Perspectives, and he has written for a variety of edited volumes, zines, and magazines, including Punk Planet, Bitch, and Souciant. From 2003 to 2013, he was an editor with the pioneering internet publication Bad Subjects and a semi-regular contributor.

He is the son of former NFL player and coach, Steve Furness, and played in punk bands for over twenty years.

== Selected works ==
=== Books ===
- One Less Car: Bicycling and the Politics of Automobility (Philadelphia: Temple University Press, 2010).
- Editor, Punkademics (Brooklyn, NY: Minor Compositions / Autonomedia, 2012).
- Editor with Thomas Oates, The NFL: Critical and Cultural Perspectives (Philadelphia: Temple University Press, 2014)

=== Journal articles ===
- Reframing Concussions, Masculinity, and NFL Mythology in League of Denial, Popular Communication, Vol. 14, No. 1 (2016): 49–57.
- Critical Mass, Urban Space and Vélomobility, Mobilities, Vol. 2, No. 2 (2007): 299–319.
- Biketivism and Technology: Historical Reflections and Appropriations, Social Epistemology, Vol. 19, No. 4 (2005): 401–417.

=== Zines and magazines ===
- "The Wu-Tang Clan’s Failed Experiment," Souciant, Dec 16, 2015.
- "Museums From Below," Souciant, June 24, 2015.
- "Walking Wounded: Author Carrie A. Rentschler Reframes the Discourse of Victimization," Bitch, No. 52 (2011), p. 19-21.
- "It’s Alright to Cry (and Needlepoint): Rosey Grier, Football Hero and Unlikely Craft God," Bitch, No. 49 (Winter, 2010), pp. 17–18, 21.
- "The Obama Administration and the Rule of 'Opposite Day'," Bad Subjects #80: Obama Annus Unus (2009).
- "Utopia and the City: An Interview with David Pinder," Bad Subjects #78: Hope (2007).
- "Federico Gomez: Pioneer of the Hardcore/Punk Scene in Israel," Punk Planet #80, July/Aug 2007, pp. 40–43.
