= Wire wheel =

Wheels whose rims connect to their hubs by wire spokes

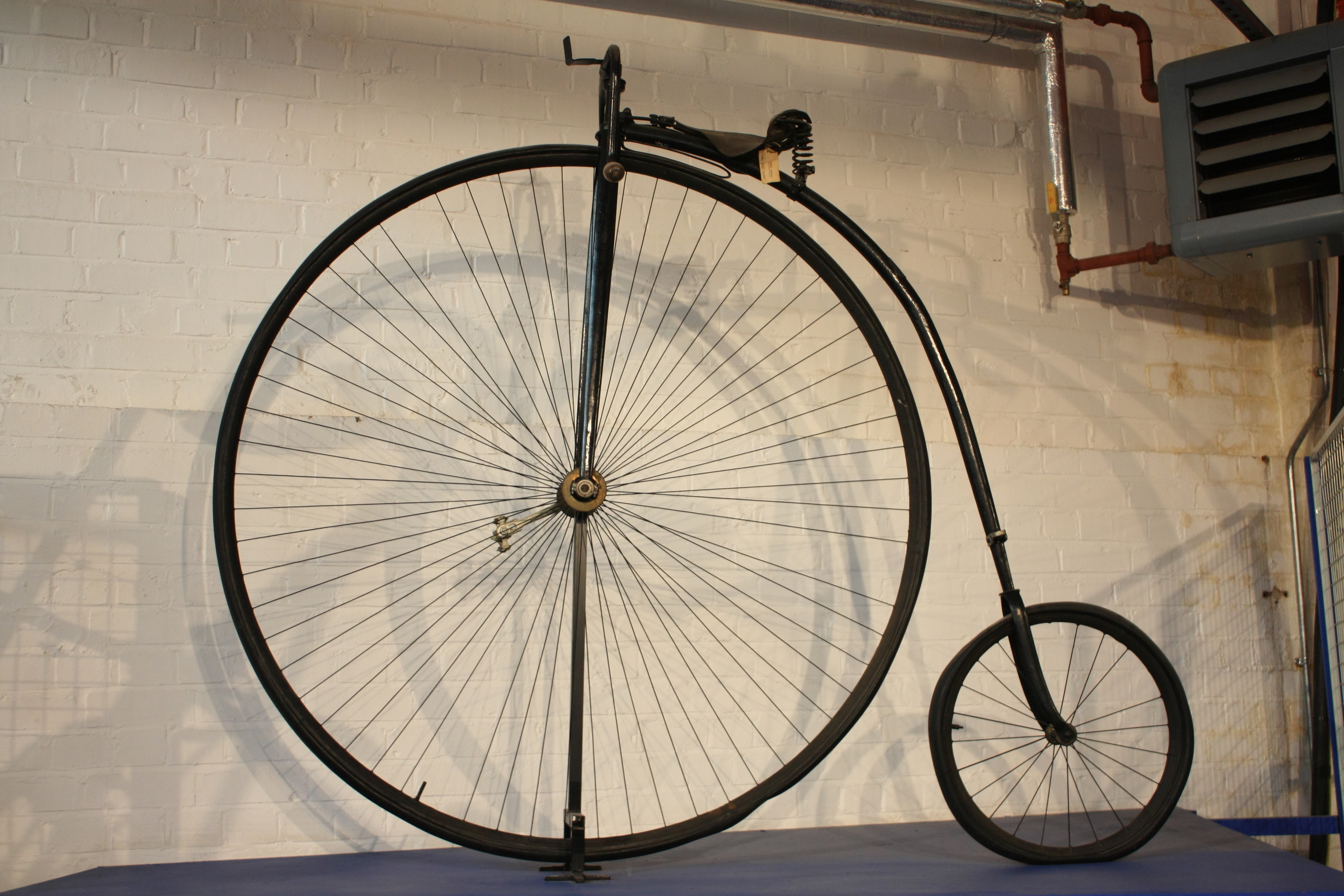
Wire wheels on a Victorian era penny-farthing bicycle

Theodore Jones' Iron Suspension Wheel, 1826

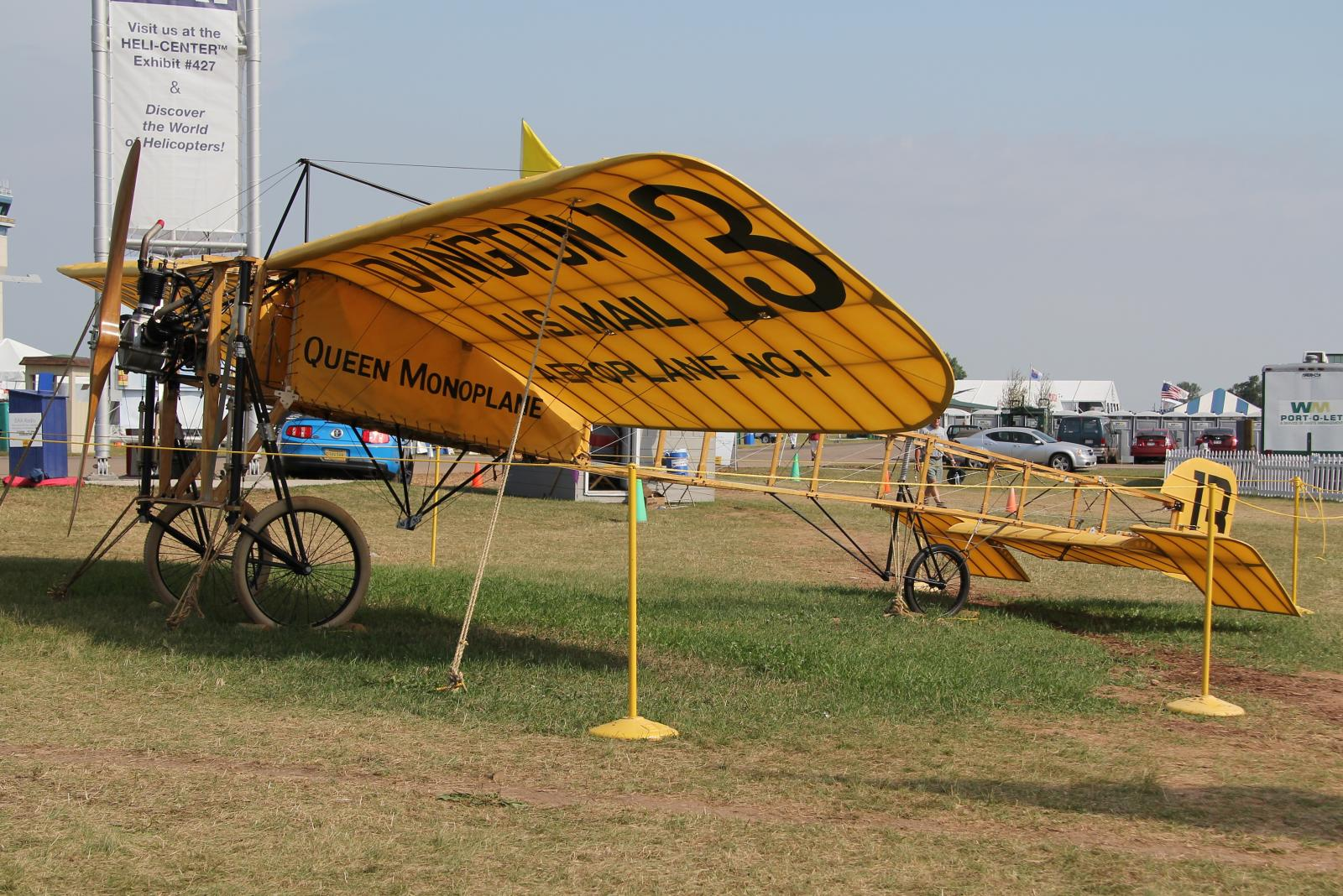
Wire wheels on a Blériot XI, which made its debut in 1909

Wire wheels, wire-spoked wheels, tension-spoked wheels, or "suspension" wheels are wheels whose rims connect to their hubs by wire spokes. Although these wires are considerably stiffer than a similar diameter wire rope, they function mechanically the same as tensioned flexible wires, keeping the rim true while supporting applied loads. The term suspension wheel should not be confused with vehicle suspension.

Wire wheels are used on most bicycles and are still used on many motorcycles. They were first developed and used in water wheels, the earliest known example being a 40' wheel installed by Thomas Hewes in 1802 at Overton Mill, near Bandon, Co.Cork. (Note: Given its large size and Co.Cork's remoteness from Hewes' base in the Manchester area, it is generally believed that Hewes must have pioneered the tension wheel locally on a smaller scale before implementing the Overton wheel.) Suspension wheels were recognised as a significant advance and the technology spread internationally, including to the United States. The 60' suspension wheel built in 1851 at Burden Iron Works in Troy, NY is widely believed to have inspired the original 250' Ferris Wheel, the largest form of suspension wheel.

On a much smaller scale, in 1808 the aeronautical engineer George Cayley proposed suspension wheels for aeroplanes, but did not apply for a patent. The first patent for iron suspension wheels was issued to Theodore Jones of London, England on October 11, 1826. These were heavy-duty wheels for carts and wagons and were used in large numbers in London in the 1830s. Eugène Meyer of Paris, France was the first person to receive, in 1869, a patent for wire wheels on bicycles.

Tangent spokes, which are better able than radial spokes to transmit torque and braking forces, were patented by James Starley in 1874 and first used on the Coventry lever tricycle of 1876. When the first motor bikes and light cars. e.g. Benz Velo of 1894, were developed, they used wire wheels. The Benz Velo used tangent spokes on the front wheels but radial spokes on the back: it followed the practice of full-size cars in using chain drive to large sprockets which were fixed to the inner spokes of the rear wheels mid-way between the hub and the rim. Full-size cars generally used wooden artillery wheels until around 1907.

It was the Rudge-Whitworth patented detachable and interchangeable wheels designed by John Pugh which led to the widespread adoption of wire wheels. These wheels owed their resistance to braking and accelerative stresses to their two inner rows of tangential spokes. An outer row of radial spokes gave lateral strength against cornering stresses. These wheels were deeply dished so that steering pivot pins might lie as near as possible to the center-line of the tires. Their second feature was that they were easily detachable being mounted on splined false hubs. A process of assembling wire wheels is described as wheelbuilding.

== On automobiles ==
From the earliest days automobiles used either wire wheels or heavy wooden or pressed steel spoked artillery type. The development of the quick detachable hubs of either Rudge-Whitworth or Riley design did much to popularise wire wheels and incidentally led to the fitting of "spare wheels". After their wooden spoked artillery wheels proved inadequate many US manufacturers paid John Pugh of Rudge-Whitworth royalties to manufacture wire wheels using his patents. Artillery wheels fell out of favour in the late 1920s and the development of the cheaper pressed steel wheels by Joseph Sankey replaced wire wheels wherever the premium price of wire wheels was not justified by their weight saving.

A sample of automobile wire wheels

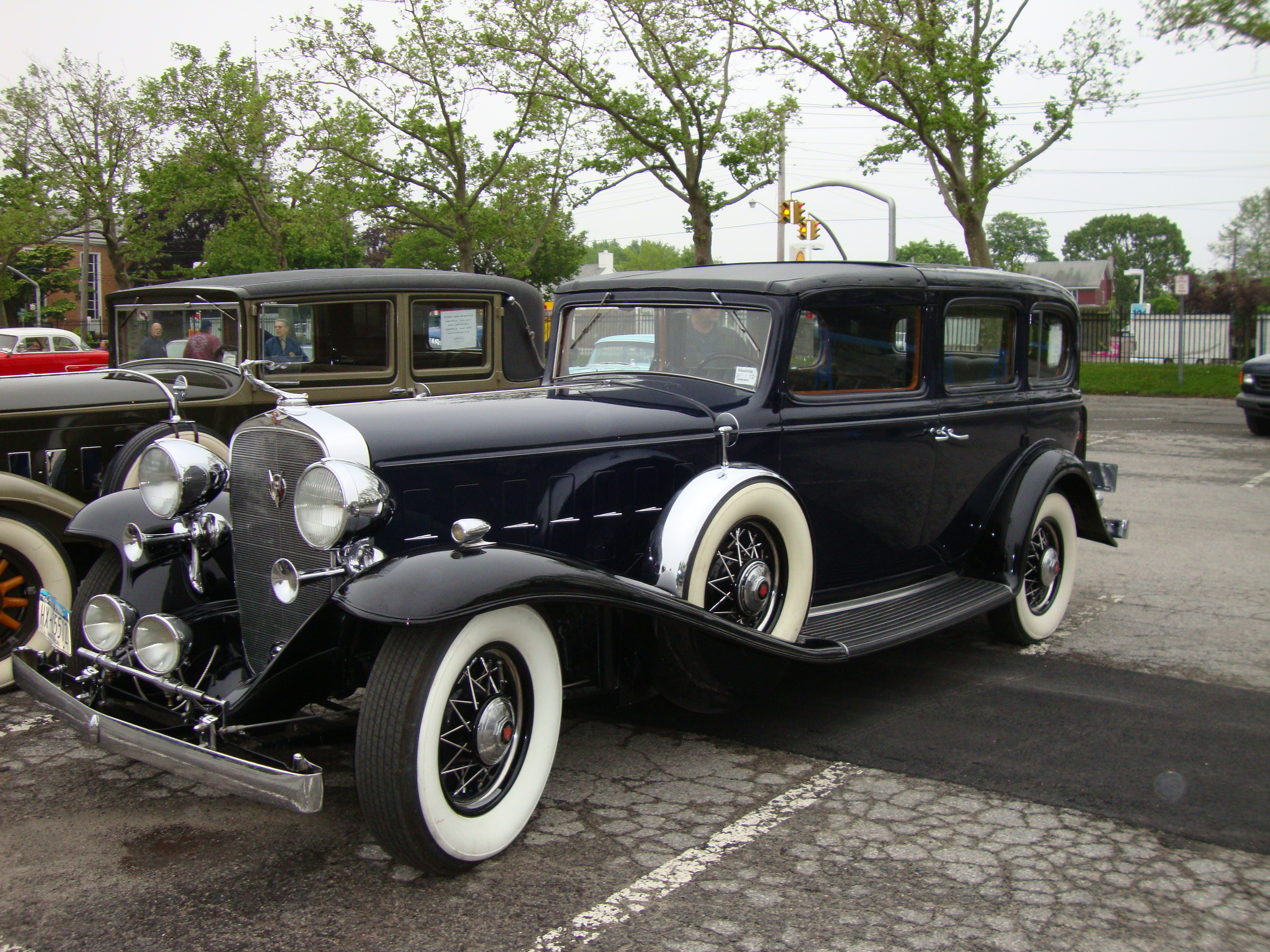
Cadillac

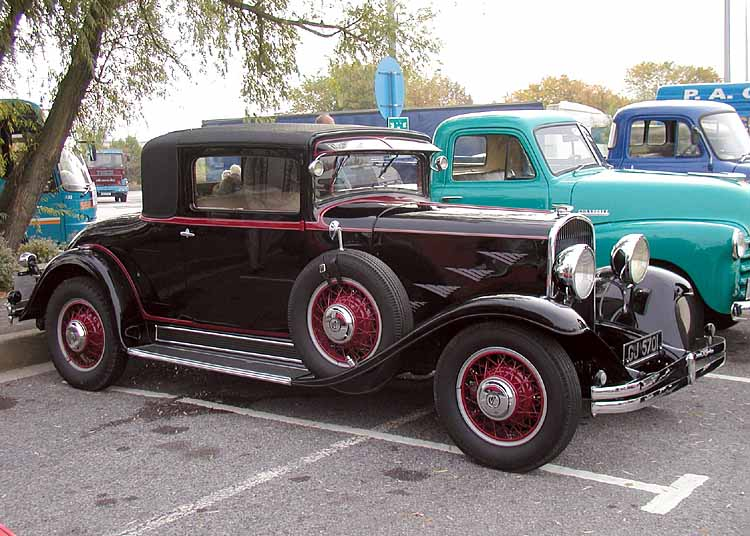
Chrysler

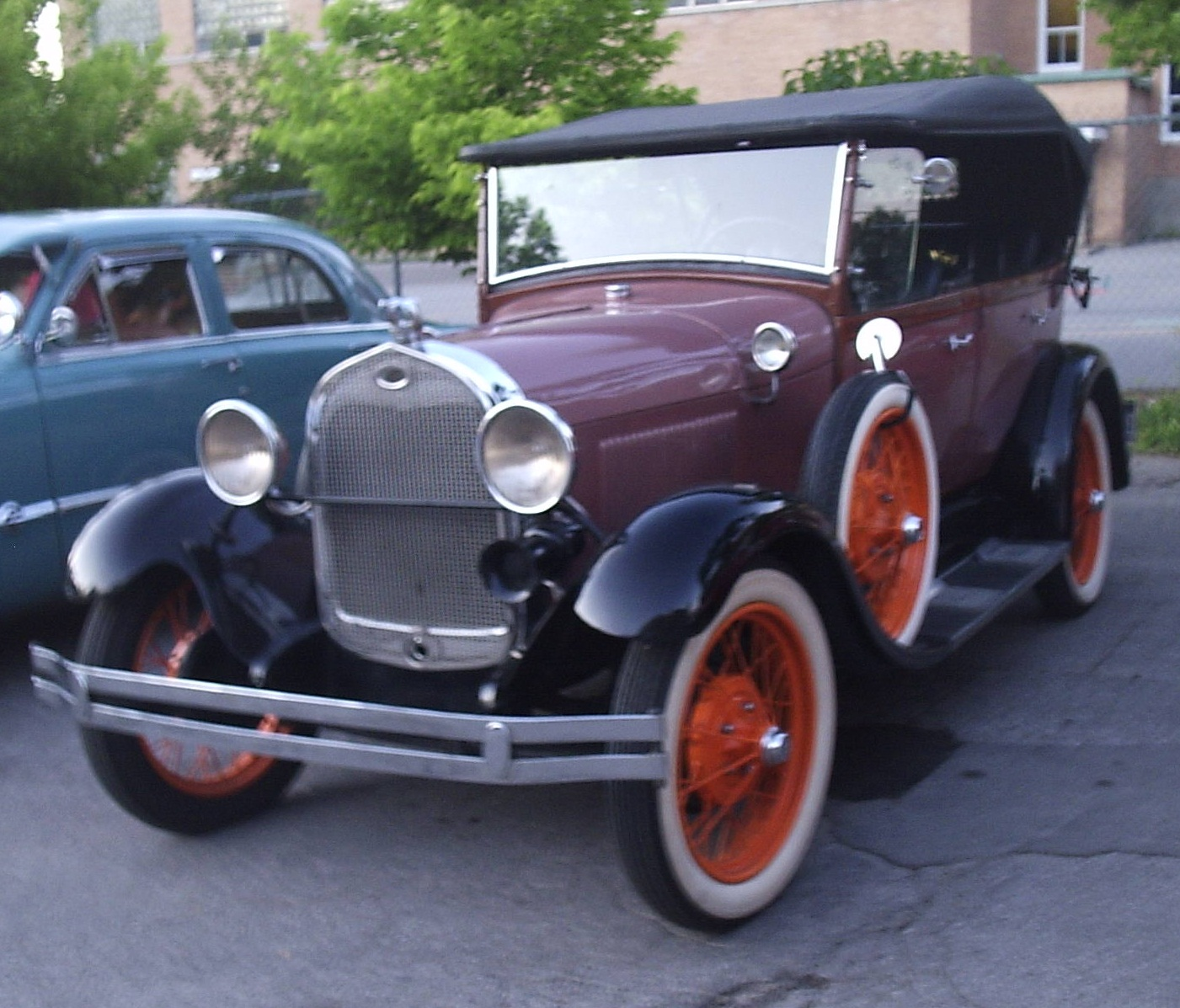
Ford

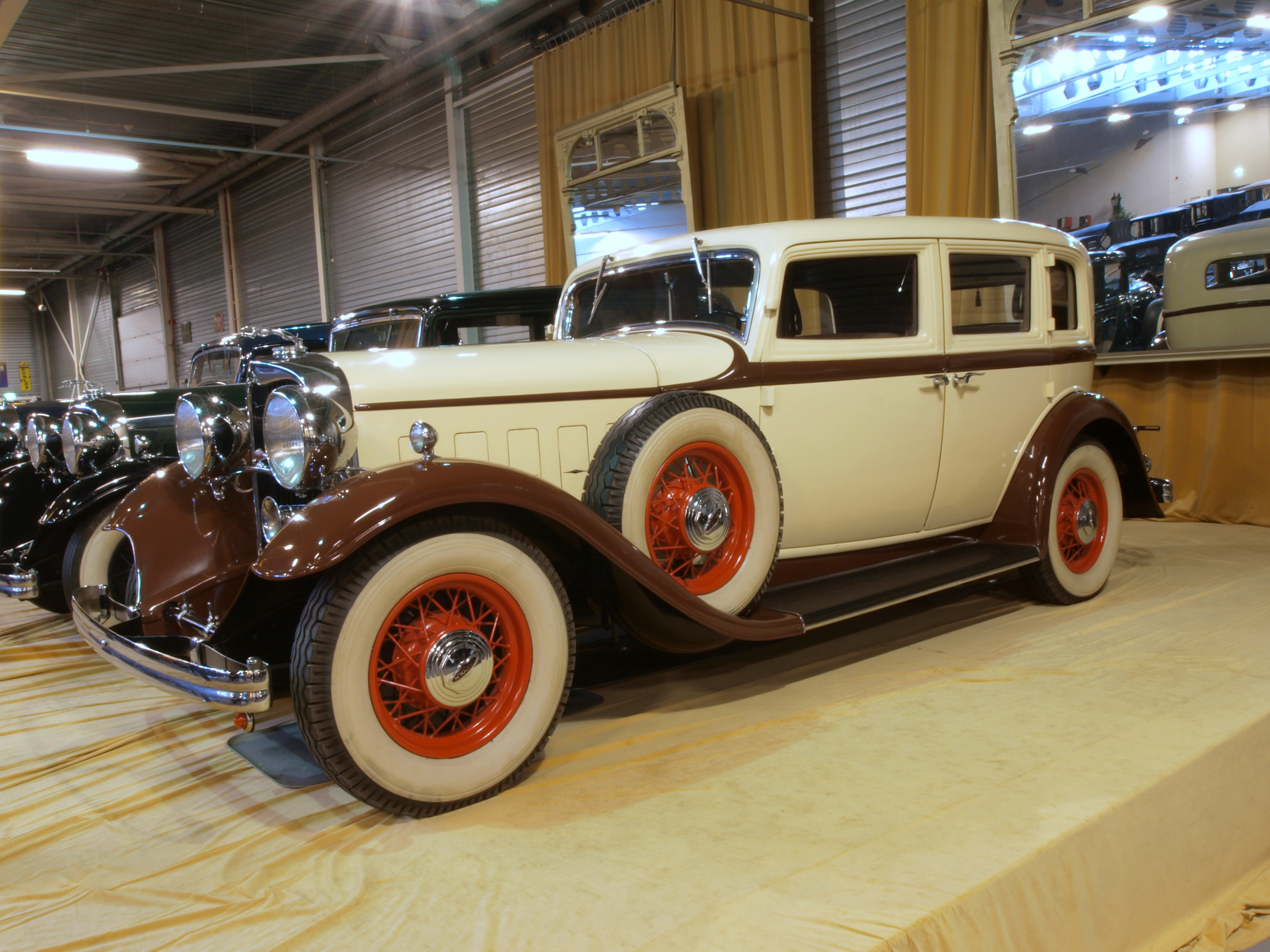
Lincoln

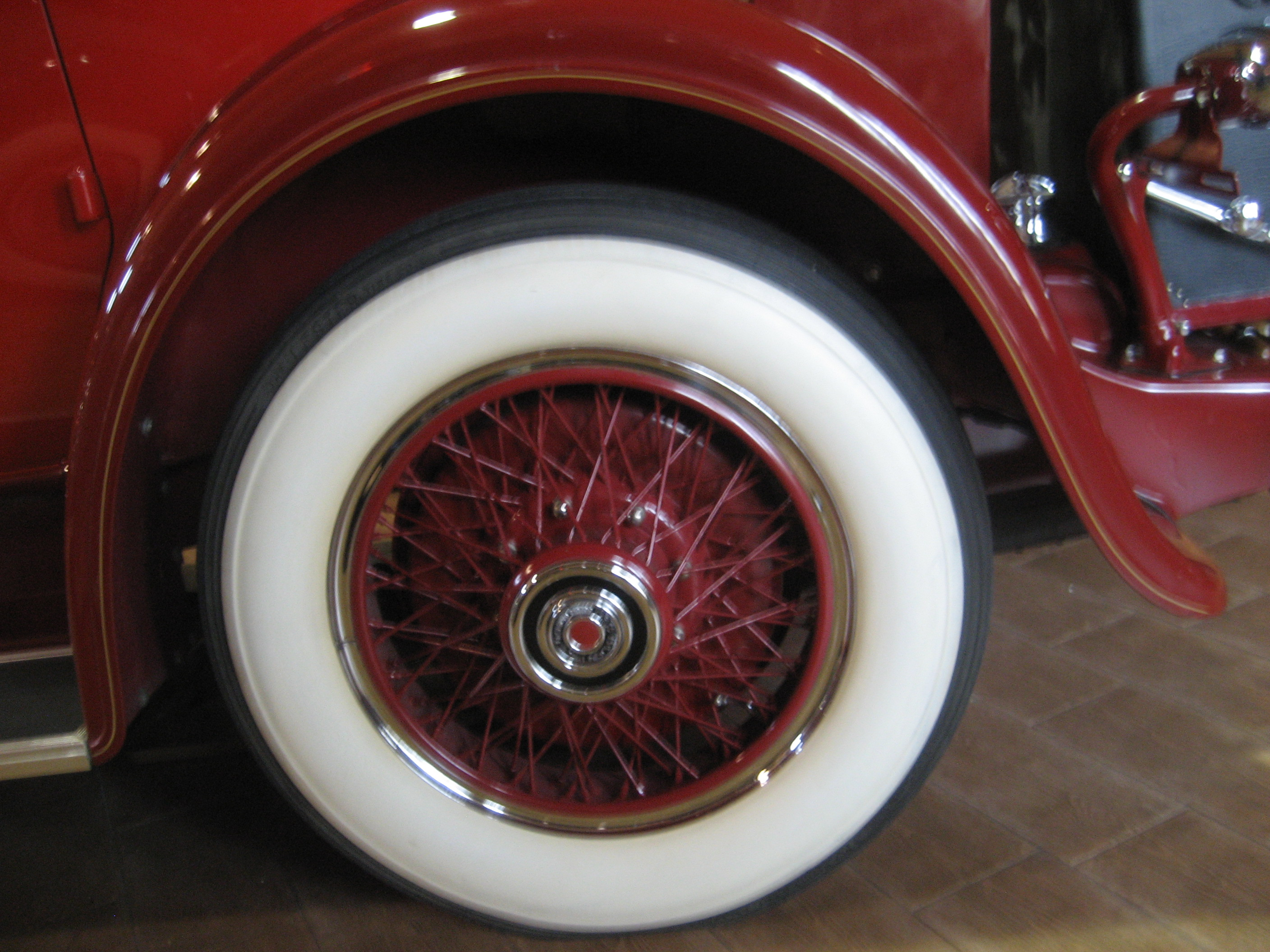
Packard

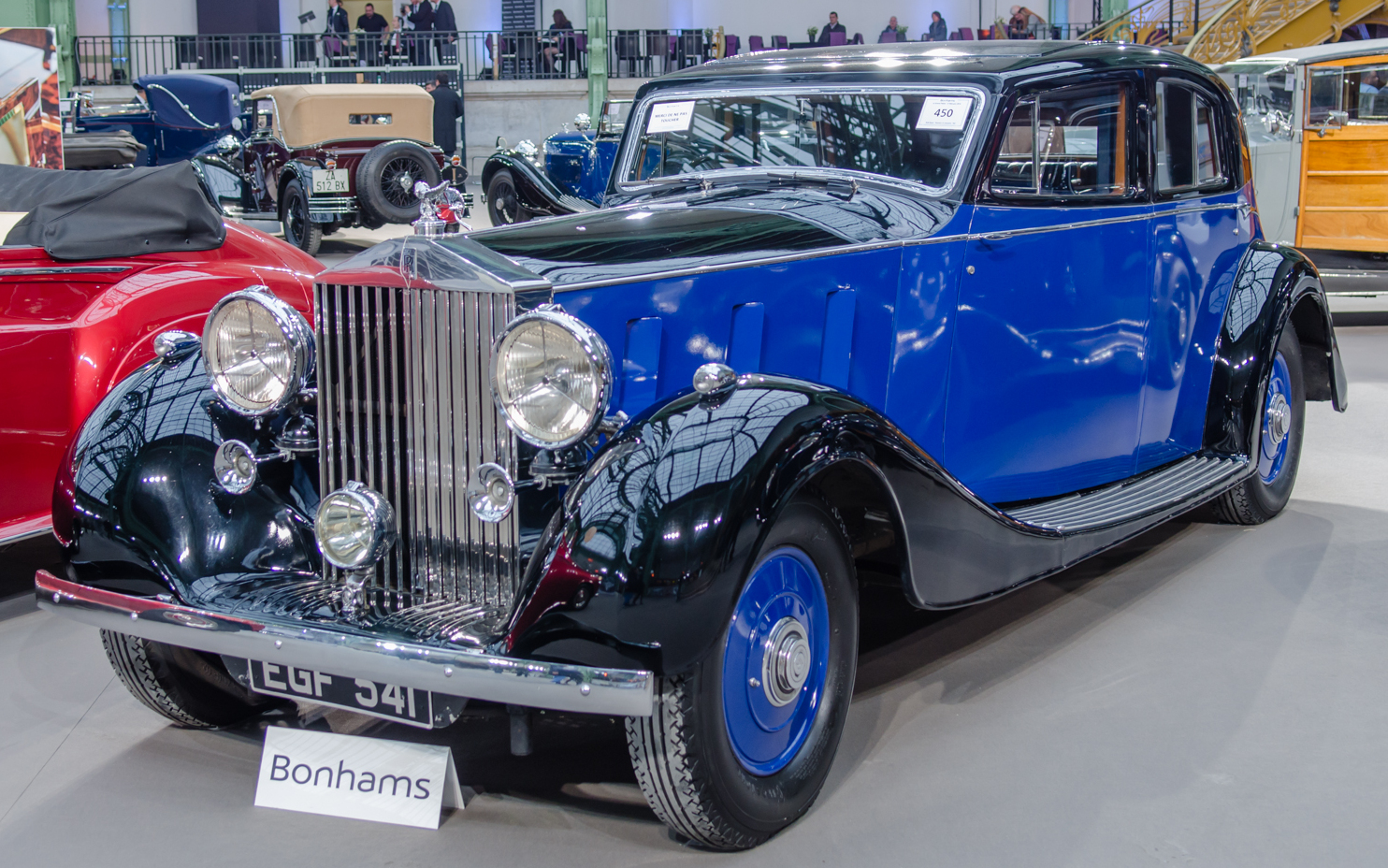
Rolls-Royce Phantom III 1937 high-quality centre-lock (wire) wheels streamlined by nave plates

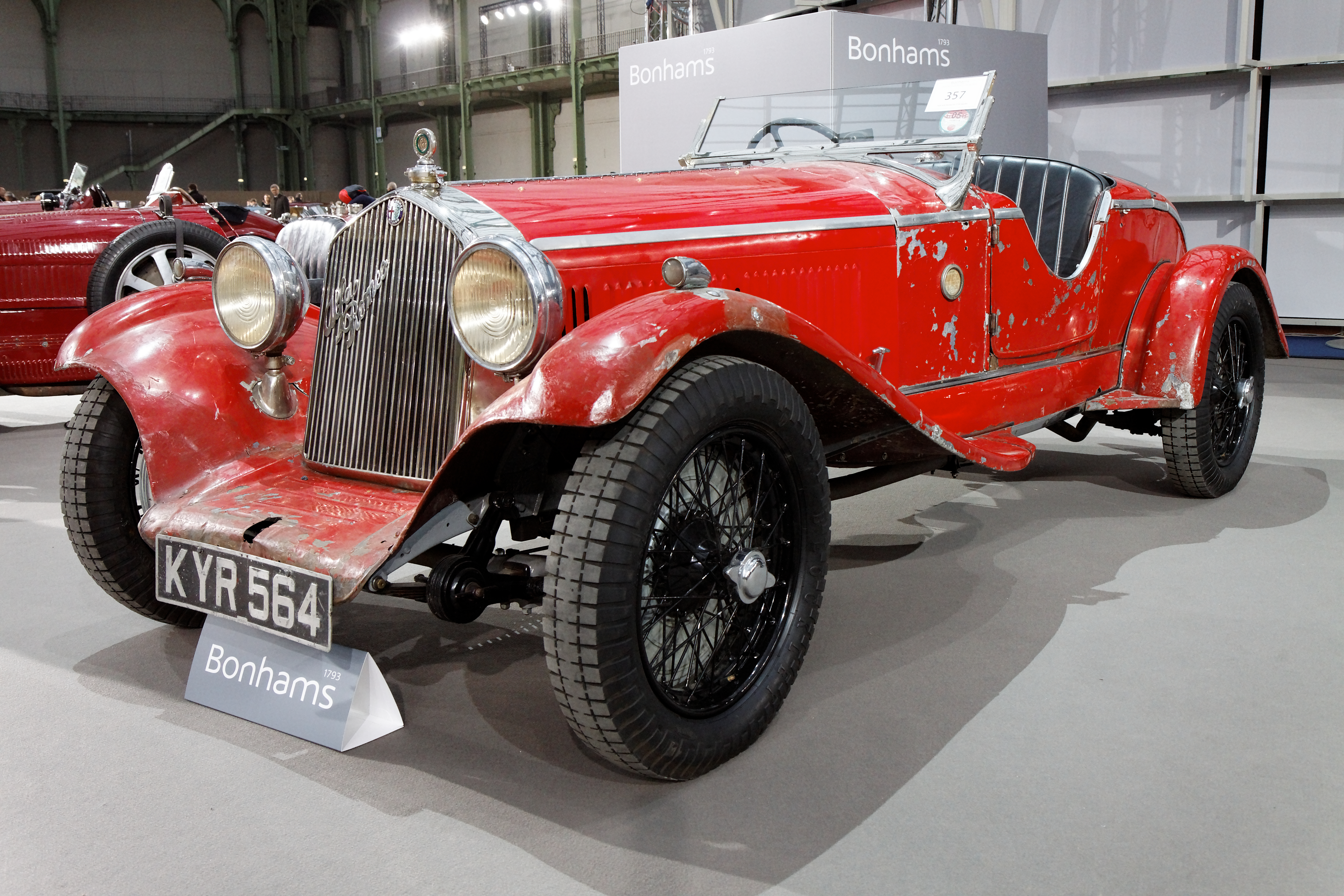
Wire wheels on a 1929 Alfa Romeo 6C 1750 Spyder Supersport

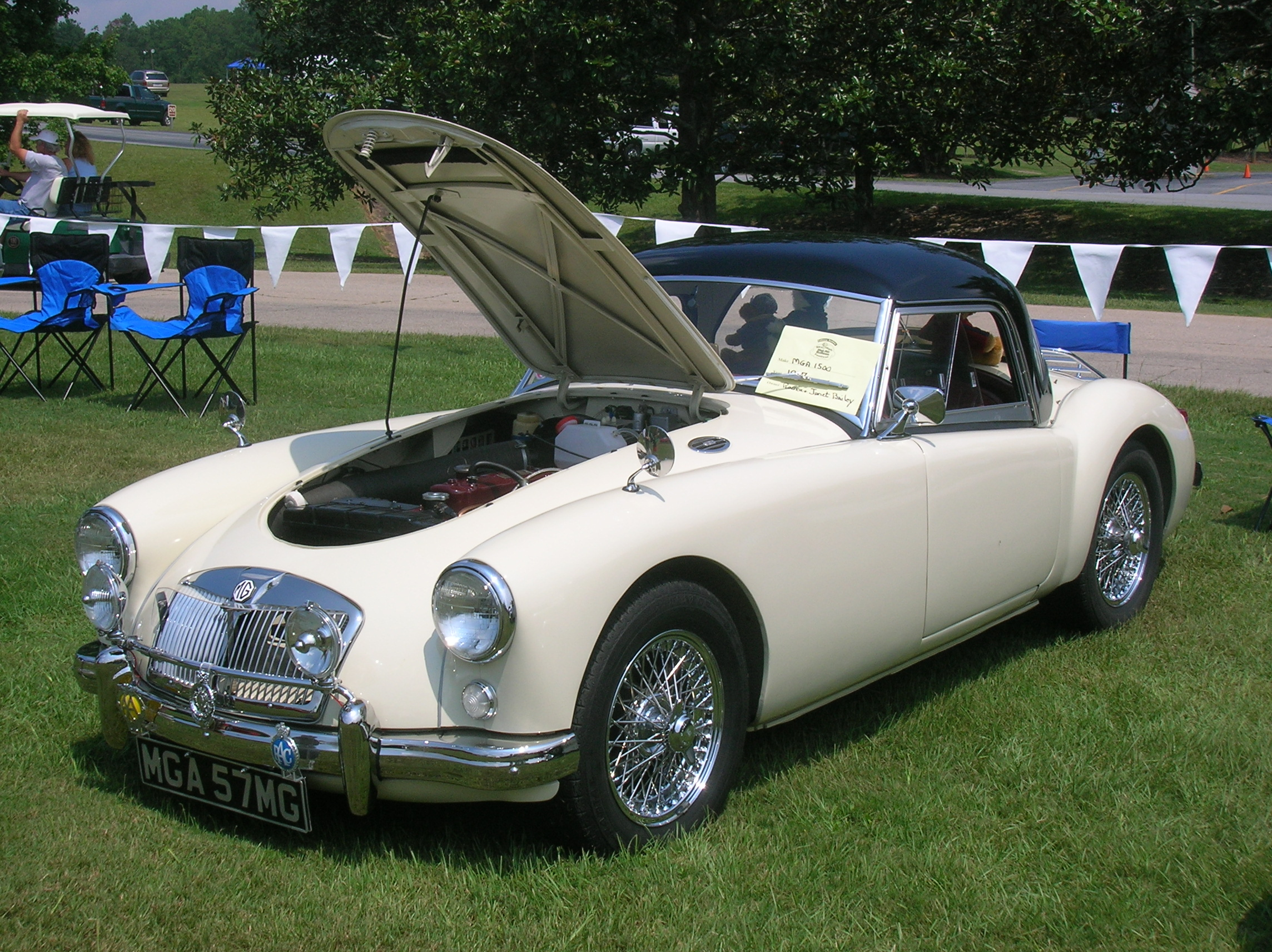
Wire wheels on a 1957 MGA

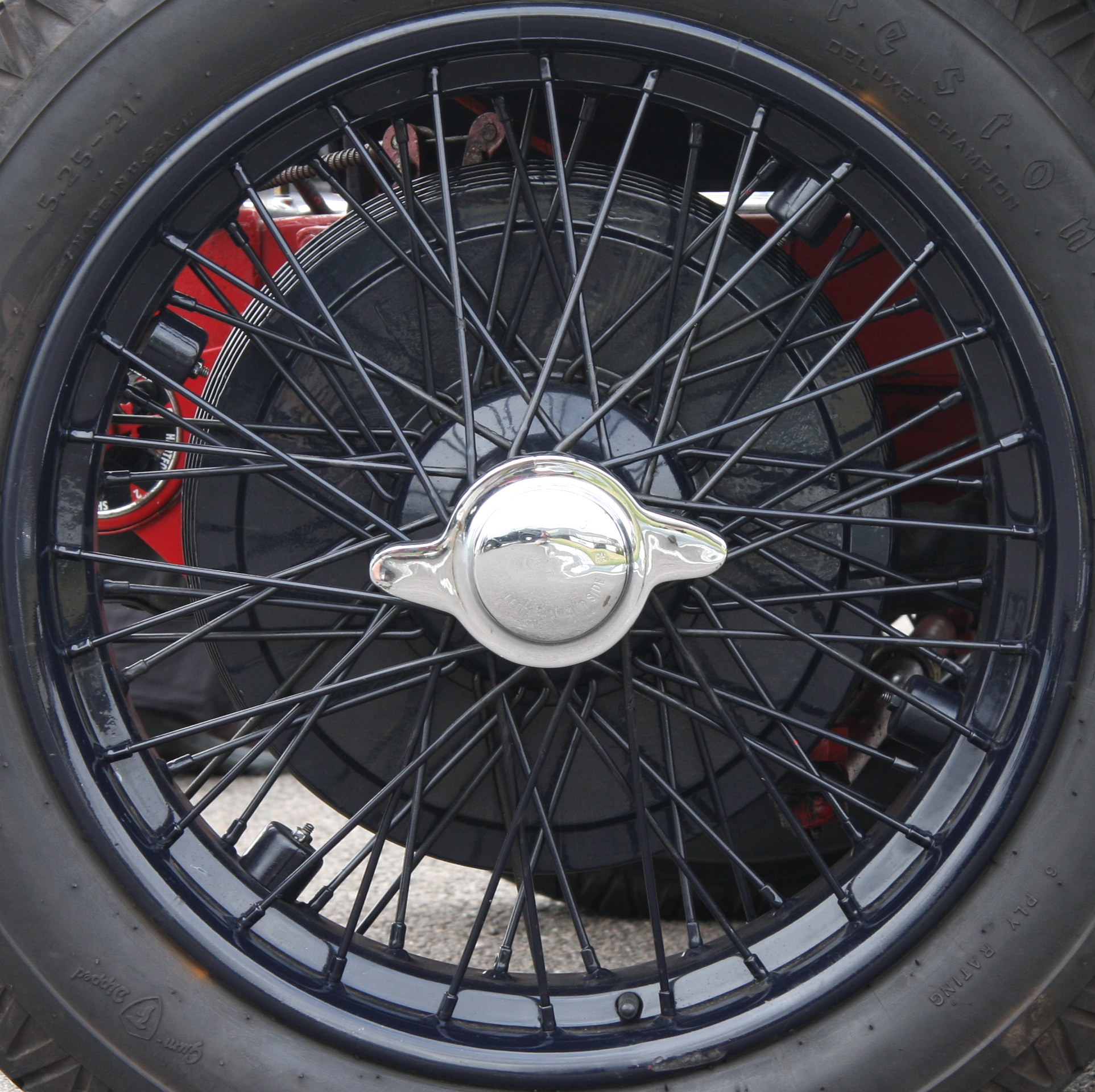
Rudge-Whitworth wire wheel on a 1922 Vauxhall 25

=== Sports cars ===
Before 1960, sports/racing cars usually had Rudge-Whitworth centerlock wire wheels equipped with splined hubs and a quick-release "knockoff" (central wing nut) locking cap that could be unscrewed by striking a wing of the nut with a special alloy mallet or "knockoff hammer". Some jurisdictions, including the United States and West Germany, prohibited eared hubcaps for safety reasons in the late 1960s. In response, some manufacturers (e.g. Maserati) preferred to hold the wheel on the splined hub by capping with a single conventional unwinged hex nut requiring a special large spanner.

In the 1960s, even lighter cast alloy wheels became usual—at first with splined hubs and knock-off caps—and now predominate. New versions of wire wheels are still made but often with standard hub bolt patterns covered by a center cap to fit without adapters.

Wire wheels on sportscars

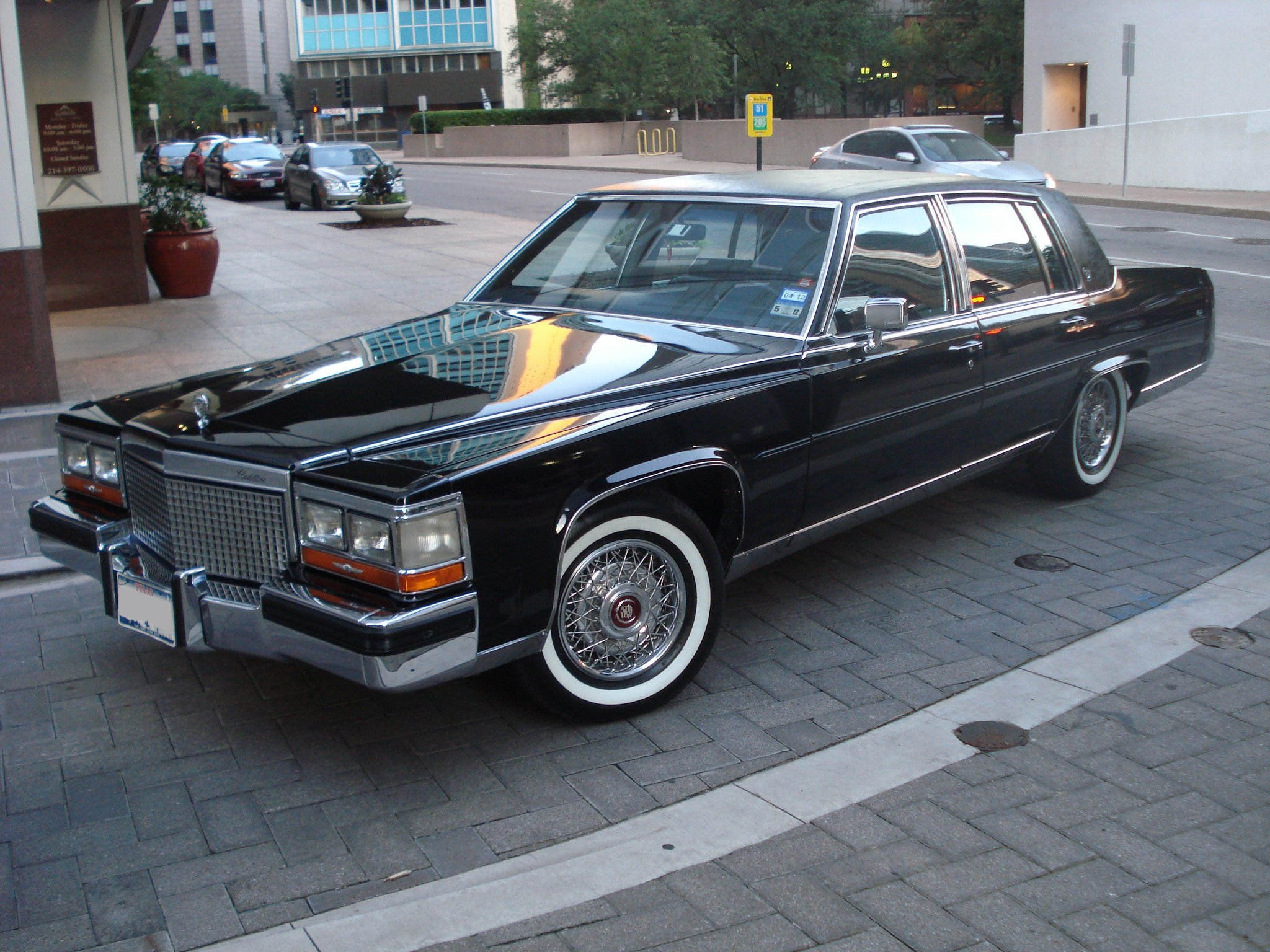
Wire hubcaps mimicking real wire wheels on a 1989 Cadillac Brougham

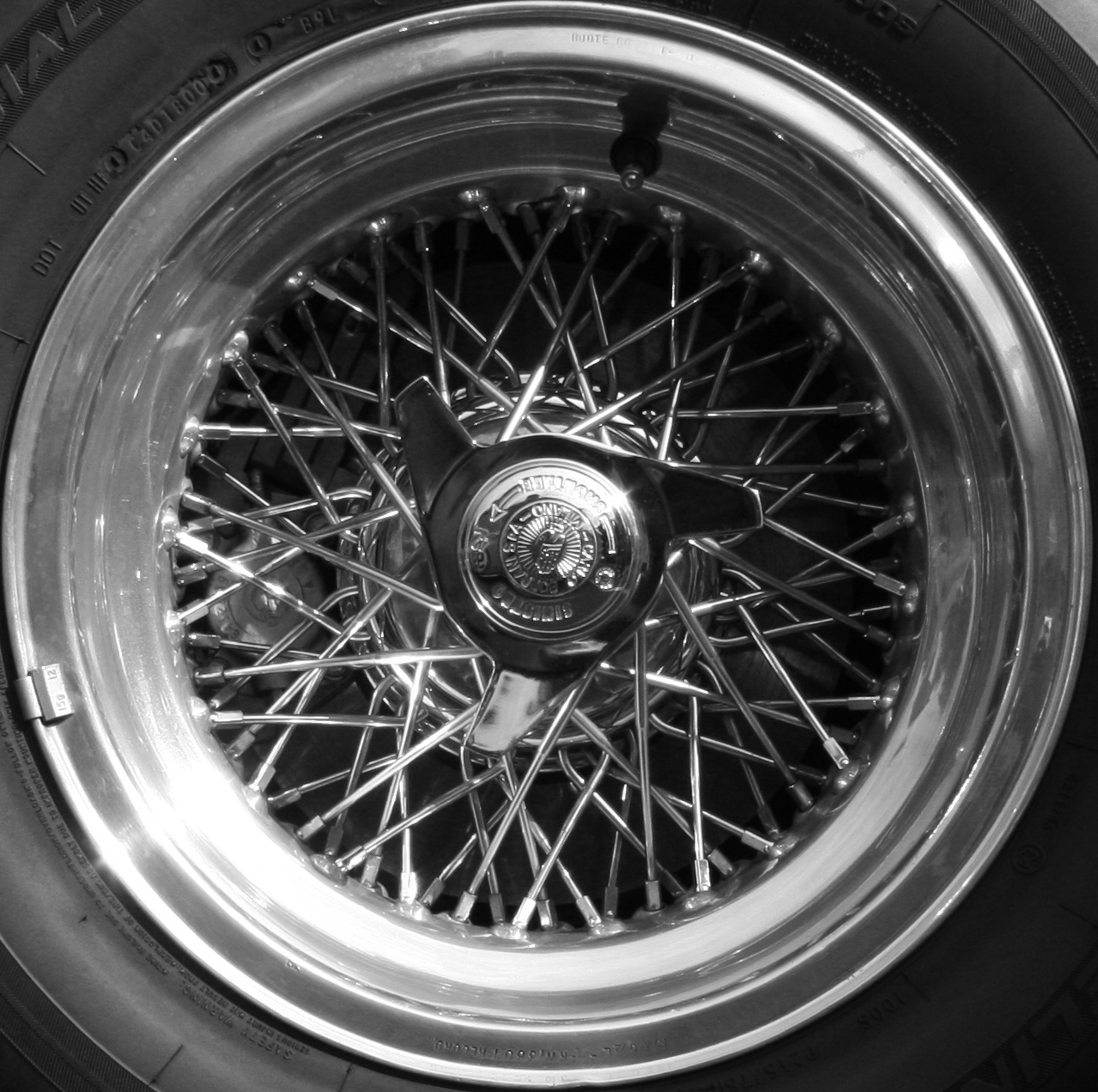
Borrani wire wheels on a Ferrari

== On motorcycles ==
At one time, motorcycles used wire wheels built up from separate components, but, except for adventure, enduro or dirtbikes, they are now mainly used for their retro appearance.

Motorcycles with wire wheels

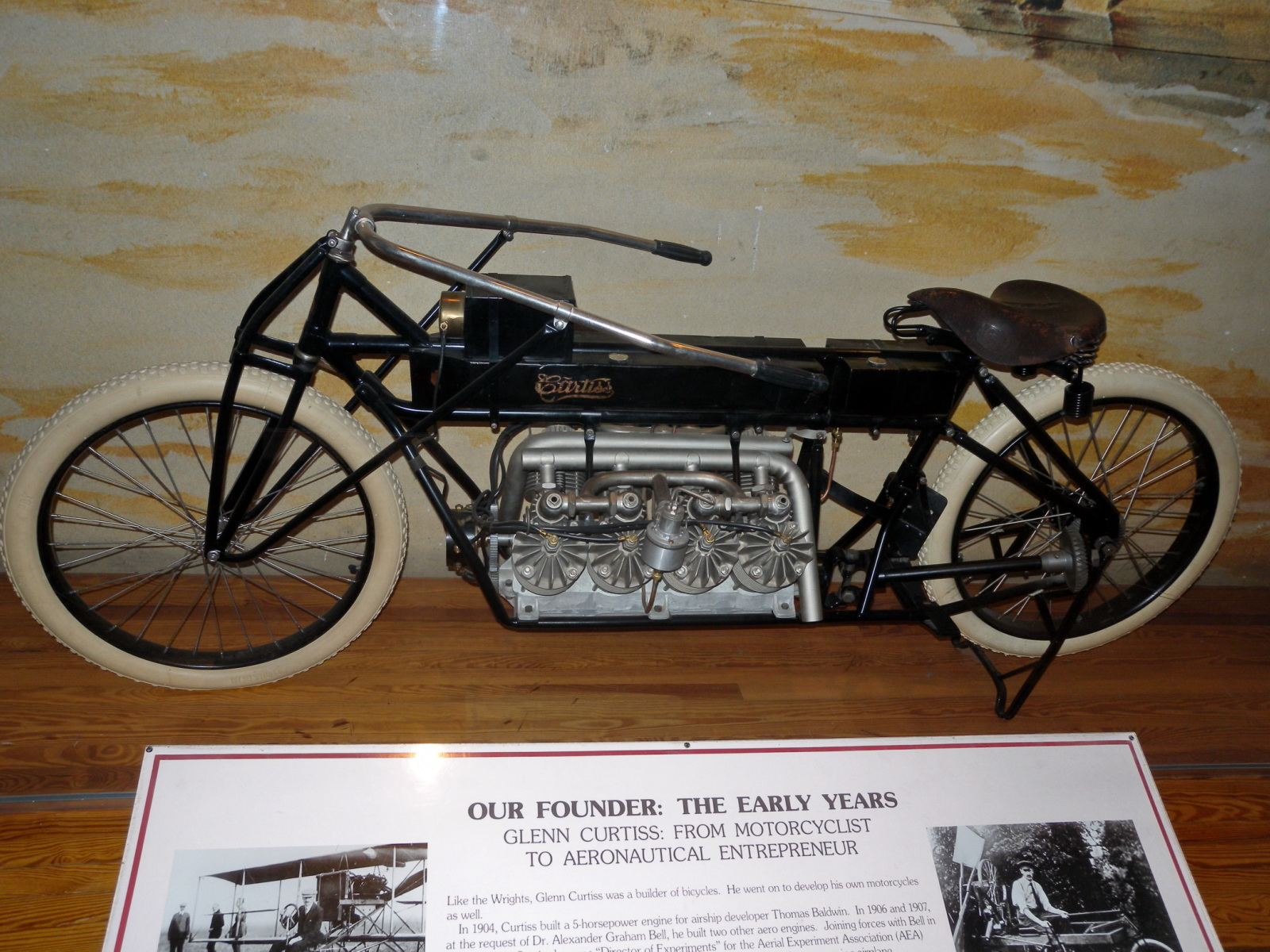
Wire wheels on a 1906 Curtiss V-8 motorcycle

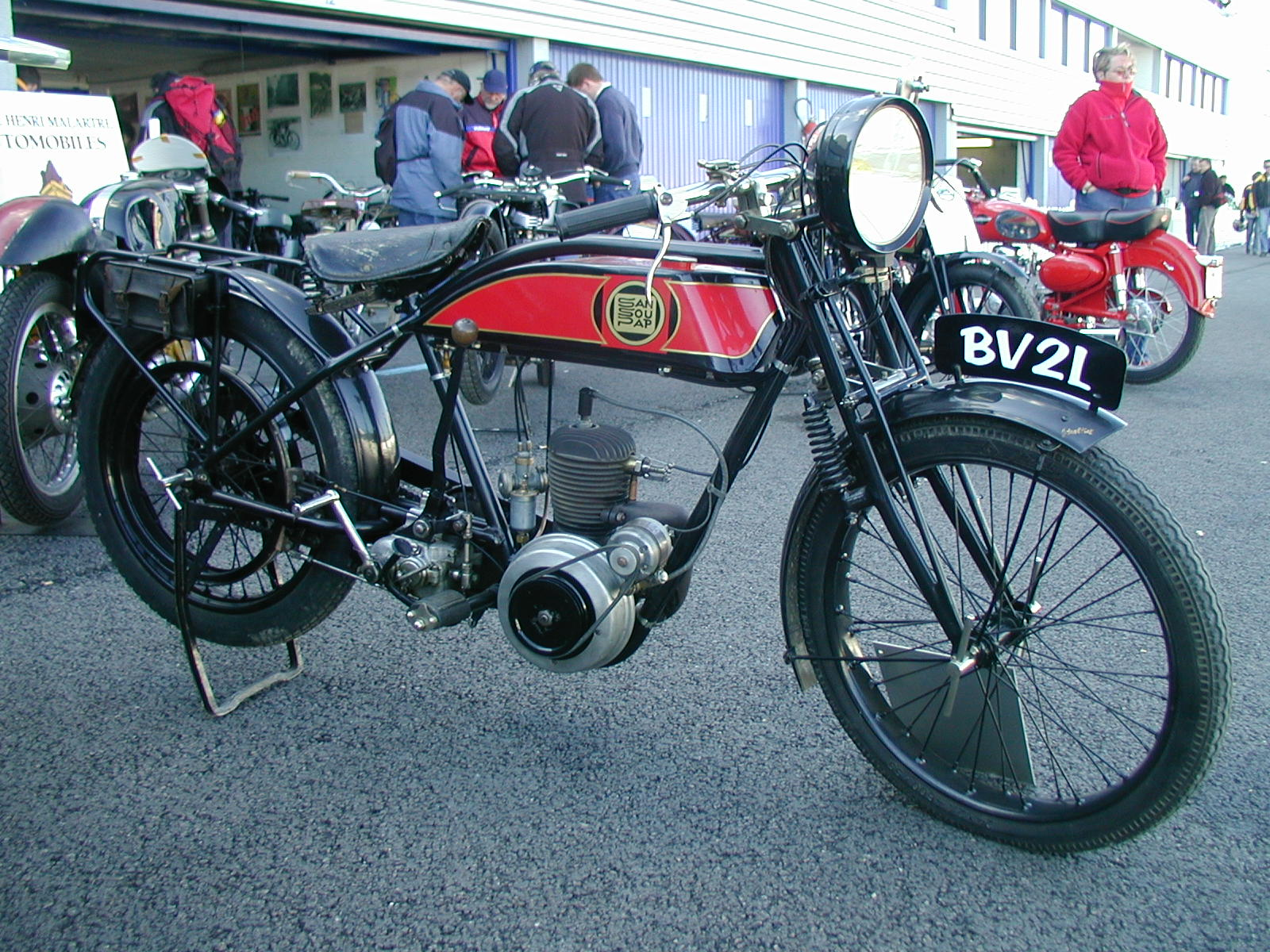
Wire wheels on a French San Sou Pap motorcycle

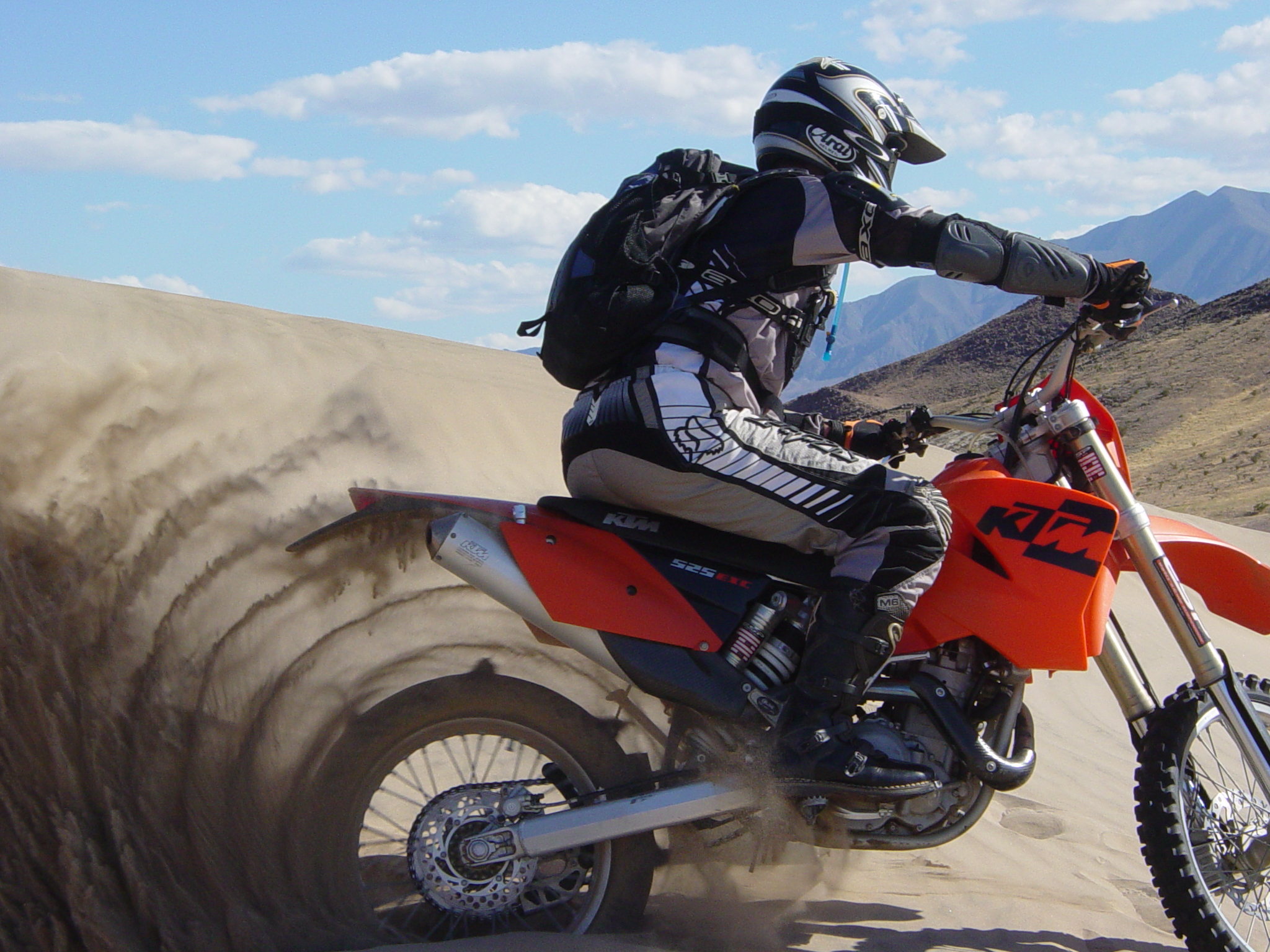
Wire wheels on a modern motocross-style motorcycle

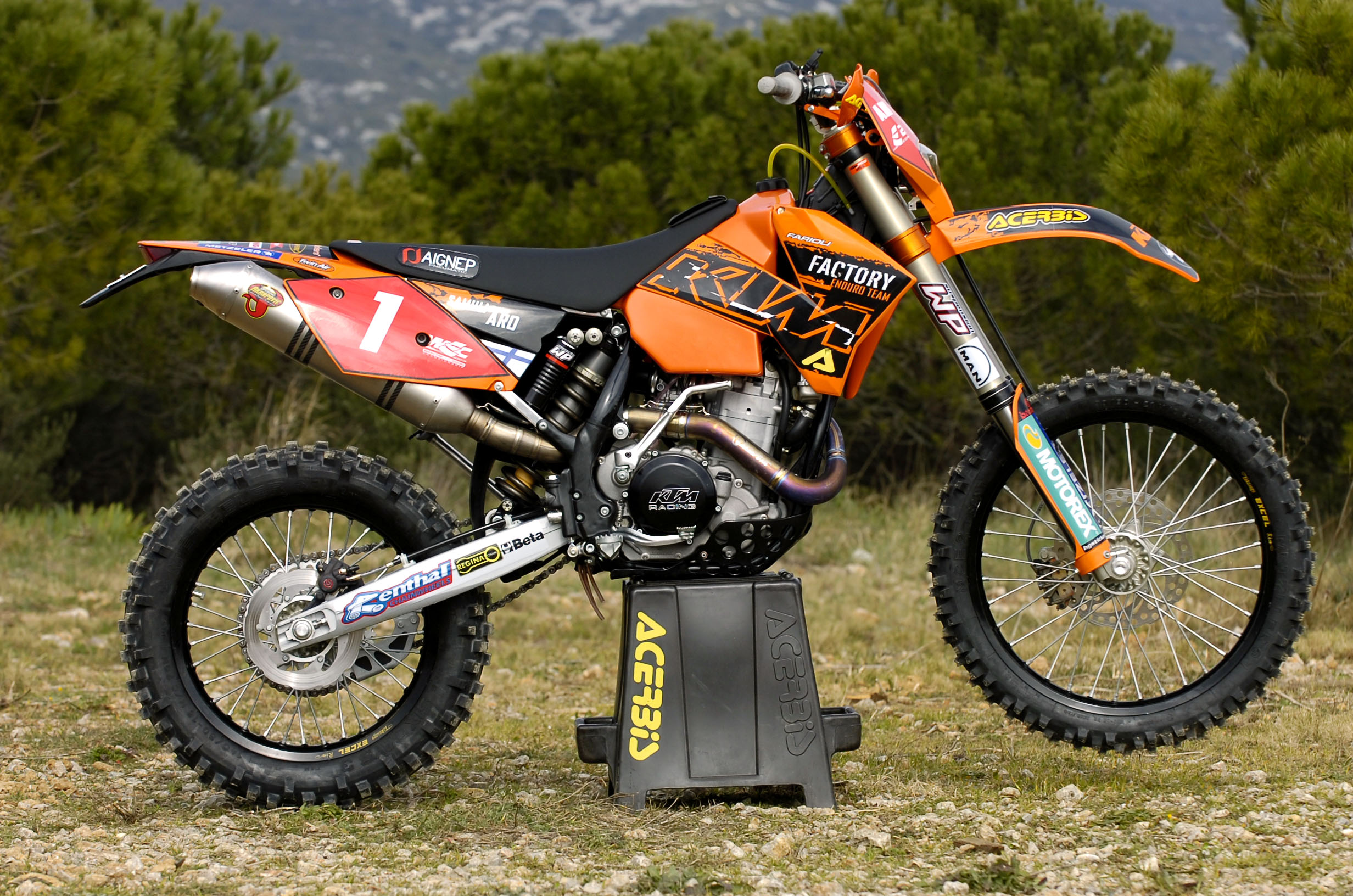
Wire wheels on a modern enduro-style motorcycle

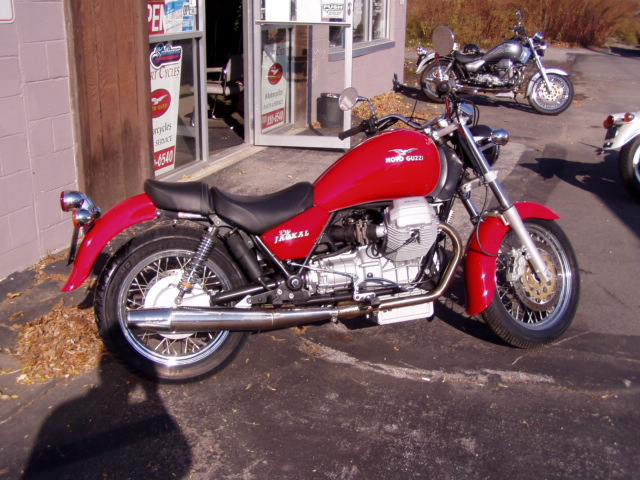
Wire wheels on a modern cruiser-style motorcycle

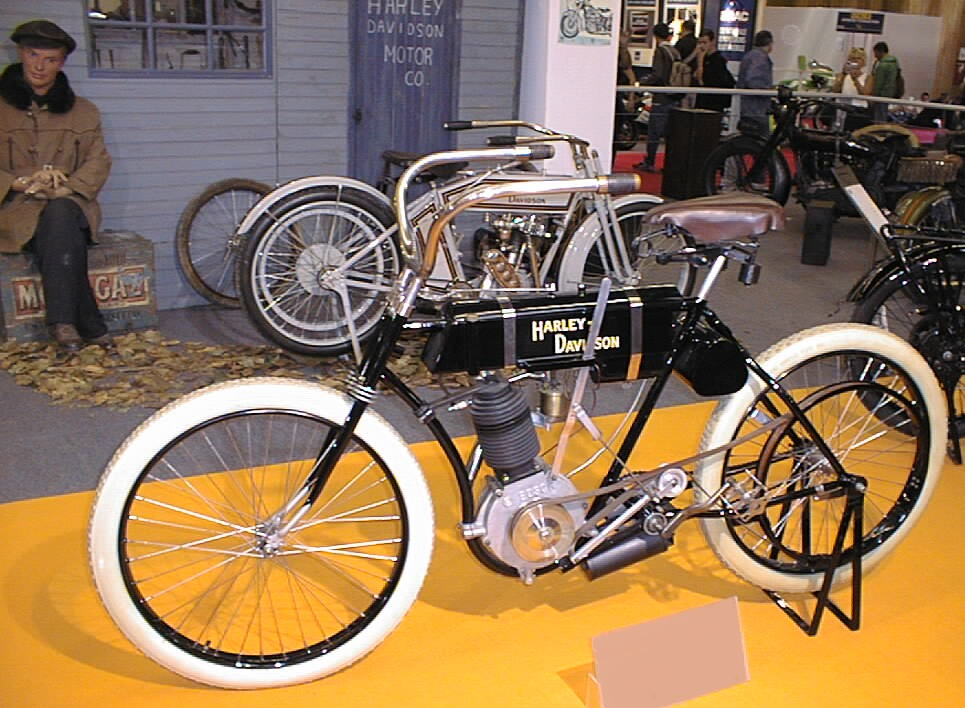
Wire wheels on the first Harley-Davidson motorcycle

== On bicycles ==
The first commercially successful use of wired wheels was on bicycles. They were introduced early on in the development of the bicycle, following soon after the adoption of solid rubber tires. This development marked a major improvement over the older wooden wheels, both in terms of weight and comfort (the increased elasticity of the wheel helping to absorb road vibrations).

In England, the engineer William Stanley developed the steel-wired spider wheel in 1849, an improvement over the cumbersome wooden spoked wheels then fitted to the tricycles that his employer was making.

Bicycle manufacturers build millions of wheels annually, using the common crossed-spoke patterns whose crossings of adjacent spokes are governed by the number of spokes in the wheel. Wheelbuilders of racing teams and in good bicycle shops build wheels to other patterns such as two-cross, one-cross, or no-cross (usually called radial). Many of these patterns have been used for more than 100 years. It is claimed that crossed patterns have more strength and stability, and that irregular patterns are art forms and have little structural merit.

In the 1980s, cast wheels with 5 or 6 rigid spokes began to appear in the Olympic Games and in professional racing. These have advantages in specialized applications, such as time trials, but wire-spoked wheels are used for most purposes.

=== Spoke tension and tire pressure ===
Typically, each spoke is pretensioned to about 100 pounds of force, on an unloaded wheel. When the bicycle is loaded with a rider, then the spokes below the hub have less tension. With every rotation of the wheel, there is repeatedly changes in the spoke tension that can contribute to broken spokes because of fatigue failures. Fatigue usually causes spokes to fail.

With the proper air pressure, the tire will absorb light bumps and vibrations and roll faster than a hard, inflexible tire at higher air pressures in the 120-130 psig range. Heavier riders require slightly higher air pressures.

== Reaction to load ==
The reaction to a radial load of a well-tensioned wire spoked wheel, such as by a rider sitting on a bicycle, is that the wheel flattens slightly near the ground contact area. The rest of the wheel remains approximately circular. The tension of all the spokes does not increase significantly; instead, only the spokes directly under the hub decrease their tension. The issue of how best to describe this situation is debated. Some authors conclude from this that the hub "stands" on those spokes immediately below it that experience a reduction in tension, even though the spokes below the hub exert no upward force on the hub and can be replaced by chains without much changing the physics of the wheel. Other authors conclude that the hub "hangs" from those spokes above it that exert an upward force on the hub, and that have higher tension than the spokes below the hub, which pull down on the hub.

Despite being composed of thin and relatively flexible spokes, wire wheels are radially stiff and provide very little suspension compliance compared to even high-pressure bicycle tires.

== Gallery ==
Wire wheels

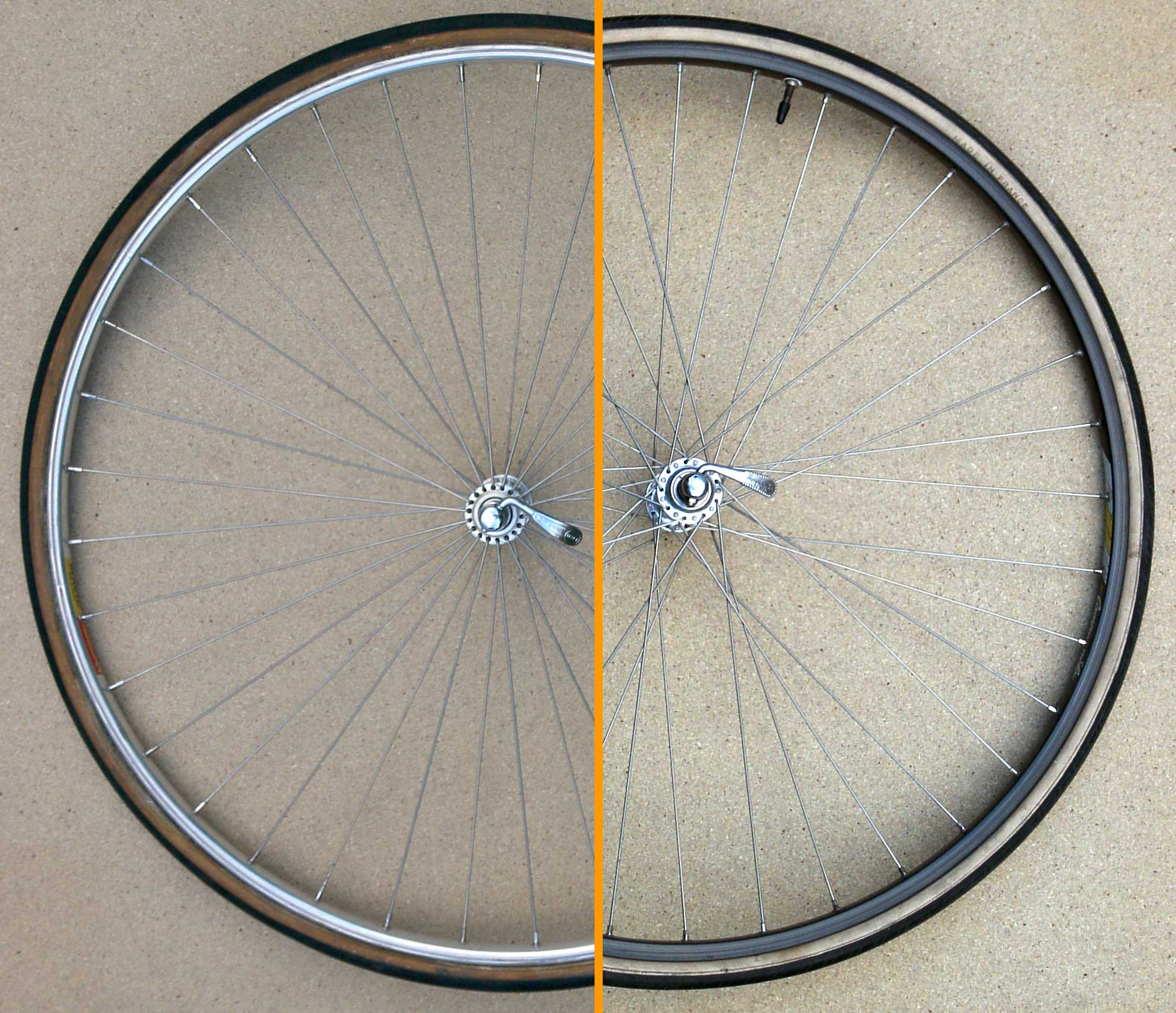
Bicycle wheels with a radial spoke pattern (left) and three cross (right)

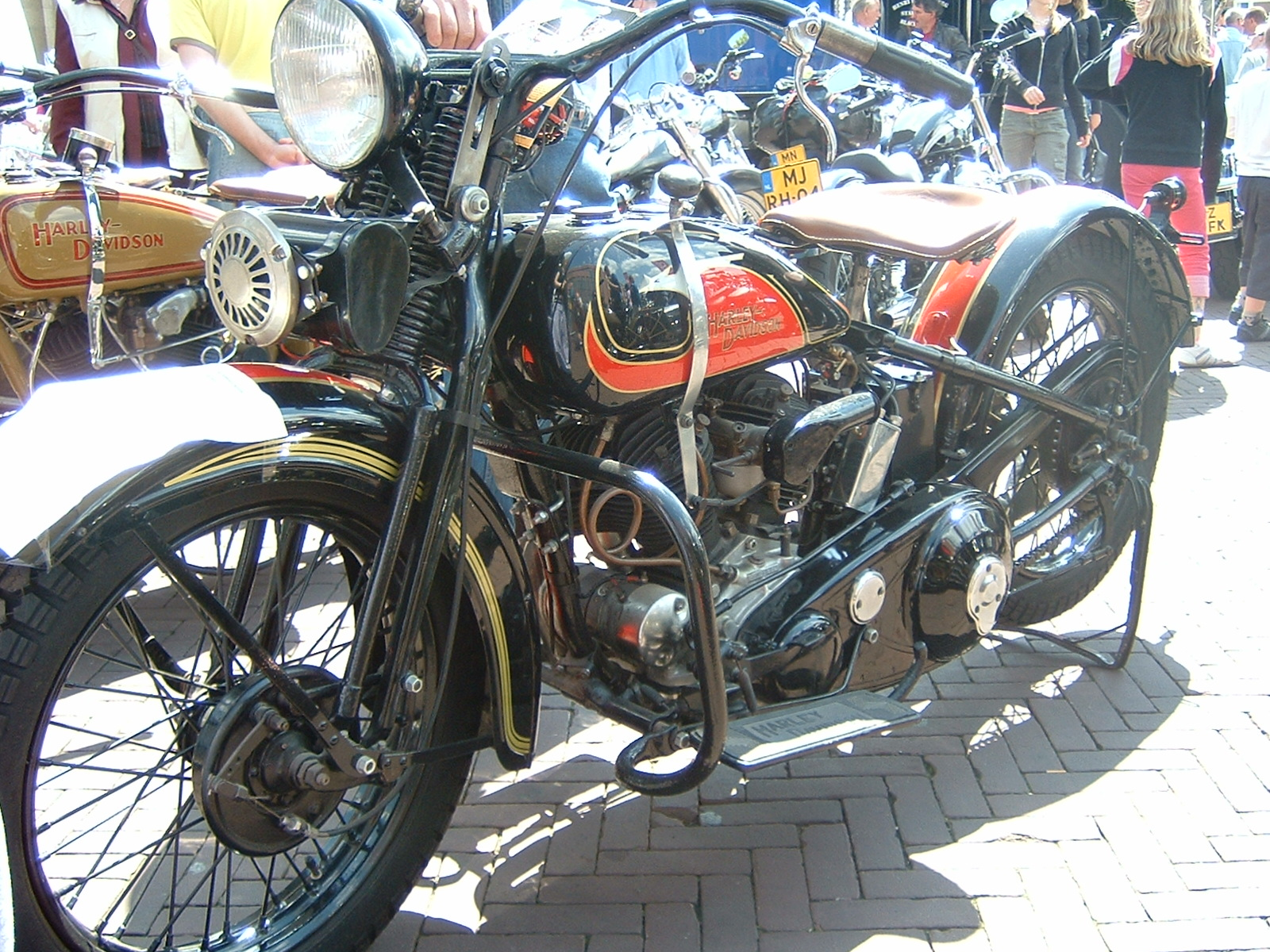
Early Harley-Davidson with wire wheels

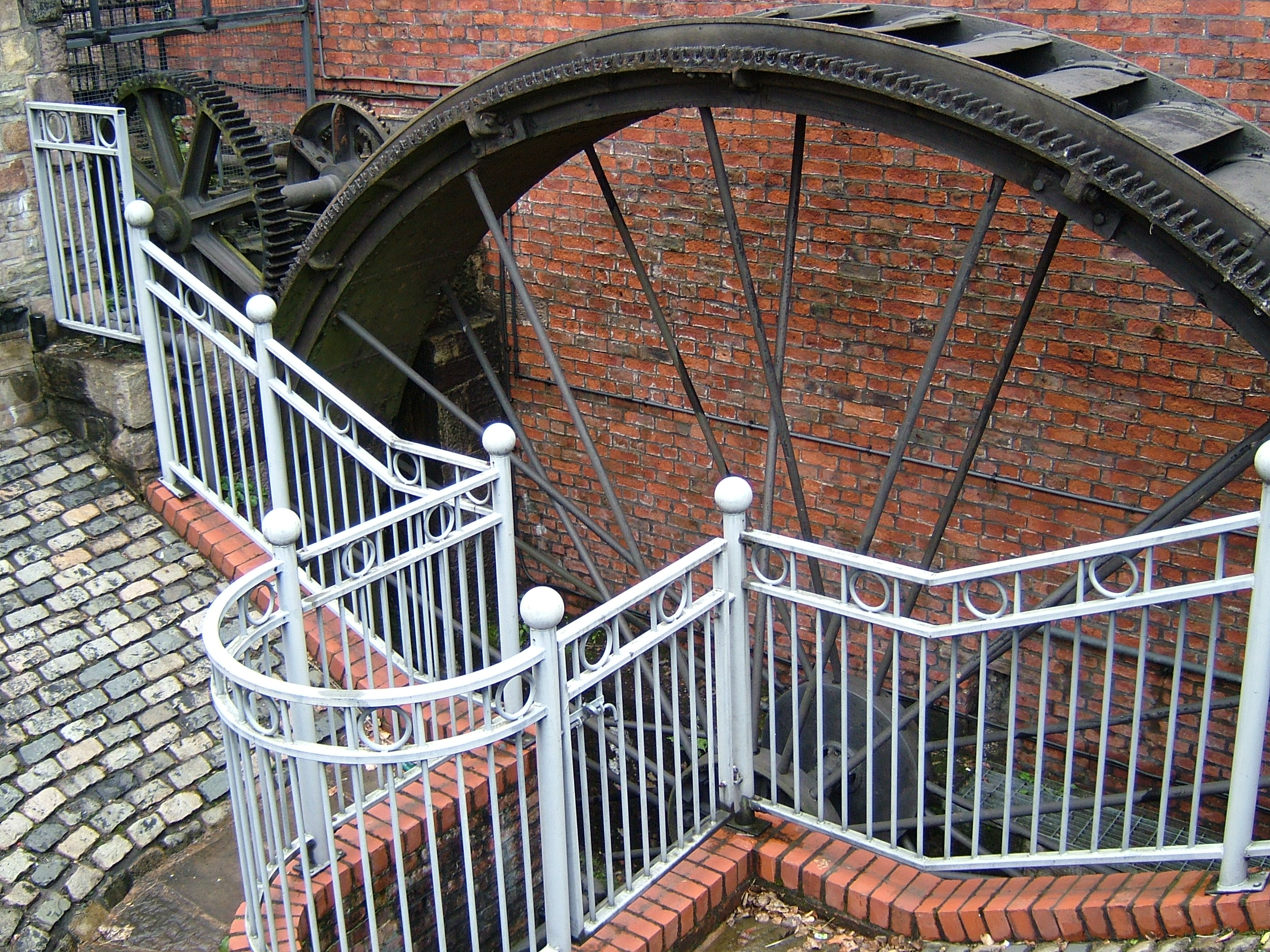
A suspension wheel at the Portland Basin Canal Warehouse
