= Wheelbuilding =

Process of assembling wire wheels

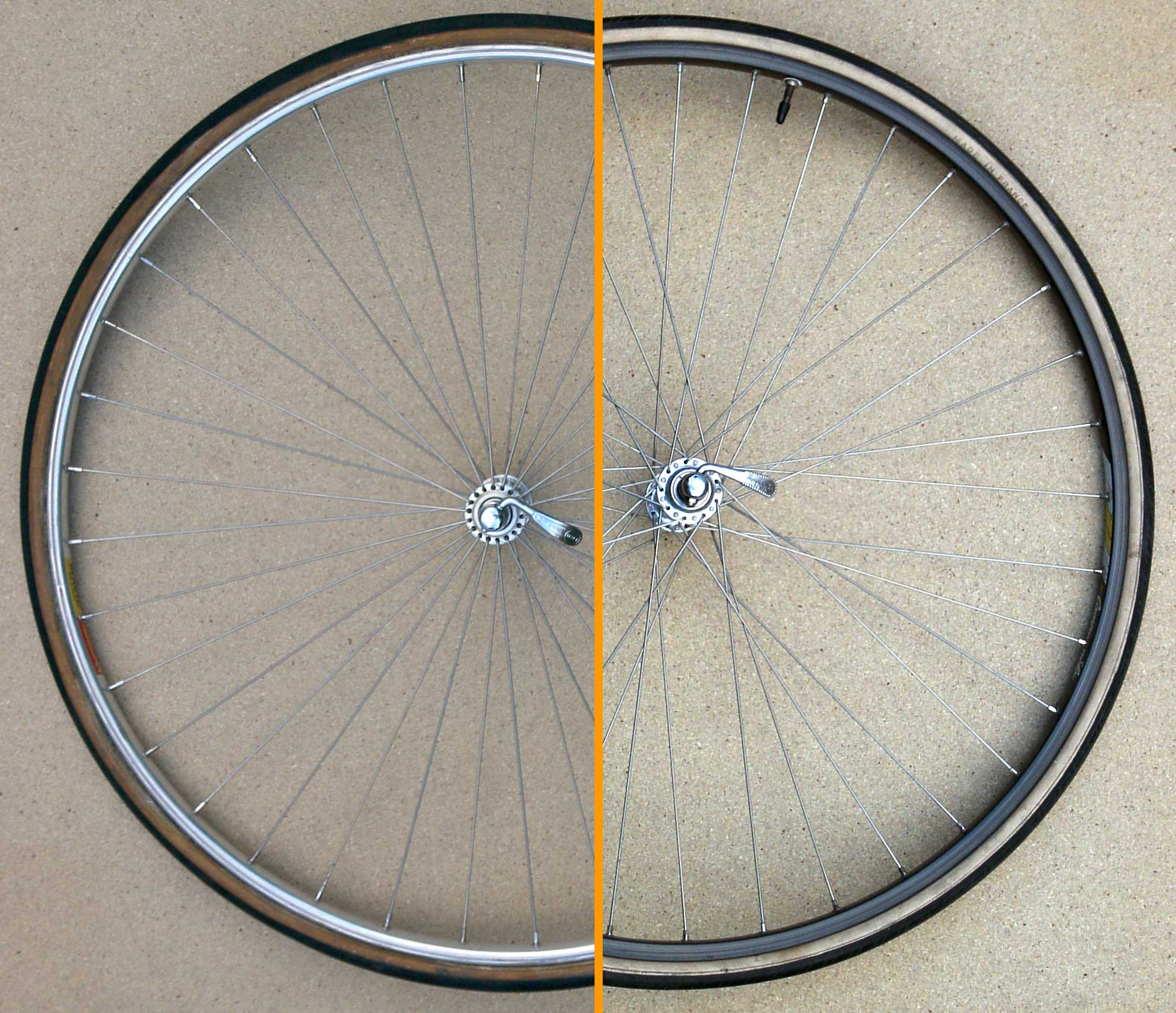
Radial (left) and semi-tangential (right) bicycle spoke patterns

Wheelbuilding is the process of assembling wire wheels (generally a bicycle wheel, but including wheelchairs, and some cars and motorcycles). The components of a wire wheel are the rim, spokes, nipples, and hub.

== Goals ==
The person who carries out wheel assembly must ensure that the wheel is true in two ways: lateral (sideways wobble) and radial (roundness/hop). The wheel also needs to be properly dished if applicable (the left and right sides of the rear wheel differ, the drive-side spokes requiring higher tension). Spokes should have no residual twist (windup) from tightening the nipples. The spokes may be "stress relieved", i.e. subjected to a greater tension during building than they are ever likely to encounter in use - usually by squeezing pairs of spokes together very hard. This 'yields' the spokes (and/or the hub) into a permanent shape, where they bend around the hub flanges and each other.

== Spoking ==
Spoking patterns may be radial or semi-tangential. For a normal wheel size and spoke count, only the latter is suitable for a wheel that has to transmit torque from the hub to the rim, as with rear wheels or hub brakes. This rule is occasionally broken where a very large number of spokes is used, or the wheel is unusually small in diameter, either of which reduces the amount of increased tensile stress on each radial spoke to an acceptable degree; some BMX bicycles and low-riders use radial spoking for both wheels. Rear wheels may also incorporate radial spoking on the non-drive side and semi-tangential spoking on the drive side. At least one example, the Mavic Ksyrium, has radial spoking on the drive side of the rear wheel.

The most common spoking pattern is "three-cross" where each spoke crosses three others on the same flange of the hub before meeting the rim. The last cross is normally "interlaced" by wrapping the spoke around the one from the other side of the flange. Radial-spoked wheels, where the spokes do not cross each other, saves roughly the weight of two spokes (because the spokes are shorter) compared to a three-cross wheel but run an increased risk of cracking at the hub flange, unless the hub is specifically designed for this pattern. Two-cross is sometimes used for hubs with large-diameter flanges (such as generator/dynamo hubs or large flange hubs), as it gives a more perpendicular spoke/rim angle, and four-cross is standard for spoke counts of 40 and above.

== Bicycle wheels ==
Most conventional bicycle wheels now use 32 or 36 spokes front and rear, although the asymmetry of the rear wheel (to allow for the cluster of sprockets), and the additional weight it carries, means it benefits from having more spokes than the front. Commonly used models vary from 18 spokes for racing bikes to 36 for cross-country touring bikes to 48 spokes on tandems and heavily abused BMX bikes. The minimum number of spokes allowed for competition is 12. Some lowrider bicycles use as many as 144 brightly chromed spokes per wheel, although these are not meant for serious riding.

Wheels can be built by machine instead of by hand. However, machine-built wheels are rarely as satisfactory as handbuilt wheels, partly because it is uneconomical to allow the machine to spend long enough on each wheel for a perfect result but also because most machines leave spokes with some residual twist. Machine-built wheels can be identified by their lacing pattern (if it is not radial), as the spokes are laced the same on each side, rather than mirrored as on hand-built wheels. More modern "factory built" wheels such as Mavic's Ksyrium series are of quite different construction from that of a conventional wheel, trading a deeper and stronger rim for fewer spokes. They are popular, and quite light (in the more expensive models) but not as durable, readily repairable or maintainable as a conventional wheel.

Stainless steel is the most common material for spokes, although most mass-produced budget wheels use galvanized steel spokes. Other materials such as titanium or aluminum are often used to reduce weight. Some wheels are designed around carbon fiber spokes, which are often completely integrated with the hub and rim and bladed in shape. Non-steel spokes are normally reserved for racing bikes and other specialist applications where weight, aerodynamics and performance are valued over durability and cost.

Rims were traditionally made of steel, but currently aluminum is by far the most common and best choice due to its light weight, high durability and stiffness. Wood is also used. Composite materials such as carbon fiber are sometimes used, typically for racing competitions such as time trial, triathlon and track cycling, although carbon fiber is becoming more common for recreational uses such as road cycling or mountain biking due to its looks, strength and feel.

== Motorcycle wheels ==
Motorcycle wire wheels typically use 36 or 40 spokes, of much heavier gauge than those on a bicycle. They are never "interlaced" in the manner described above, nor are "radial" builds recommended (only wheels without brakes). Motorcycle rims are dimpled toward the hub at each spoke location, and the holes for the spokes are drilled into the dimples at an angle. This angle is a function of the cross-pattern used to lace the wheel, the diameter of the hub flanges, and the width of the hub at the flanges. Conical-hub wheels have a different angle drilled into one side of the rim when compared with the other side. Adequate spoke tension is very important with motorcycle wheels, because of the greater torque applied to the wheel by an engine or disc brake. Loose spokes on a wheel fatigue rapidly and break, usually at the bend where they attach to the hub. When this happens, the wheel must be rebuilt using all new spokes, because even unbroken spokes in such a wheel are fatigued, and will usually break when tightened during the truing operation.

== Spoke length ==
The correct length of spokes required can be calculated using rim diameter, hub flange diameter, hub width, lacing pattern, and number of spokes. See and. These calculations can be done either by hand (the old-fashioned way - with a pen, paper and calculator) or by using a computer. There are many programs available and they range in complexity from simple Excel spreadsheets to stand alone desktop applications and web based calculators. An alternative method is to refer to a table which has the spoke lengths for a number of common hub and rim combinations.

== Other conventions ==
A good wheelbuilder will ensure that the valve hole lies between two nearly parallel spokes to ease attachment of a pump head. This does not affect the structural integrity of the wheel, and this rule is usually observed.

If the hub has a maker's label on its barrel, it is convention for the label to face (and be readable through) the valve hole. The rim labels should be readable from the right-hand side (drive side) of the bicycle. The hub labels should face in the same direction front and rear (generally so they are readable from the seat), this means that even an undished, symmetrical front wheel has to be laced to the rim the "proper" way round, if perfection is the aim.

== See also ==
- Bicycle mechanic
- Bicycle wheel
- Blacksmith
- Spoke wrench
- The Bicycle Wheel
- Wheelwright
