= Batcave (disambiguation) =

The Batcave is Batman's secret hideout.

Batcave or Bat Cave may also refer to:

- Batcave (club), a gothic rock nightclub in London
- Bat Cave, Nepal
- Bat Cave, North Carolina
- Bat Cave and Cascade Caverns State Nature Preserves, a nature preserve in Kentucky dedicated to protecting the endangered Indiana bat
- Bat Cave mine, a cave in Arizona
- Royal Ontario Museum Bat Cave, artificial bat cave in Toronto's Royal Ontario Museum
- Bat Cave, Saint Lucia, a cave in Saint Lucia
- Gowanus Batcave, a former power station in Brooklyn, New York City
- Lepakkoluola (literally "bat cave"), a former youth cultural location in Helsinki, Finland
- Bat Cave Bicycle Library, a bicycle repair service
