= Open Shed =

Coordinates: 50°7′9.7″N 5°32′18.61″W

Presentation during the Raspberry Jam event at Open Shed Penzance

Open Shed was a hackerspace in Penzance, Cornwall. Founded in 2012 (closed May 2014) it provided space for people working in the tech community to meet and work, workshops for electronics and light engineering projects, bike kitchen, events space, and an informal café. Run as a social enterprise, many of its members were self-employed.

== Description ==
Open Shed's 200m^{2} rented premises were situated in central Penzance, next to the Savoy Cinema on the busy shopping street, Causewayhead. Occupying the whole of the ground floor of Champions Yard, with a small space on the first floor, facilities include an electronics workshop, coworking space, café, bike kitchen, quiet space, large events room with projection facilities, equipment stores, and a small workshop. It encouraged knowledge exchange and collaboration between its members, who included programmers, web developers, electronic engineers, digital artists, practitioners from the digital humanities, bicycle mechanics, and other tech related fields. Open Shed provided physical space and facilities to encourage activities from these areas: "We're all about empowering people to take control of the technology which surrounds us all."

The first event at Open Shed, a Raspberry Jam, was held on 15 August 2012. Using the Open Shed events room for the first time since opening, the Raspberry Jam explored the Raspberry Pi computer and its many uses through talks, demonstrations, with hands-on time. It was attended by 36 people.
