= Santa Ana River Trail =

Multi-use trail in Southern California, US

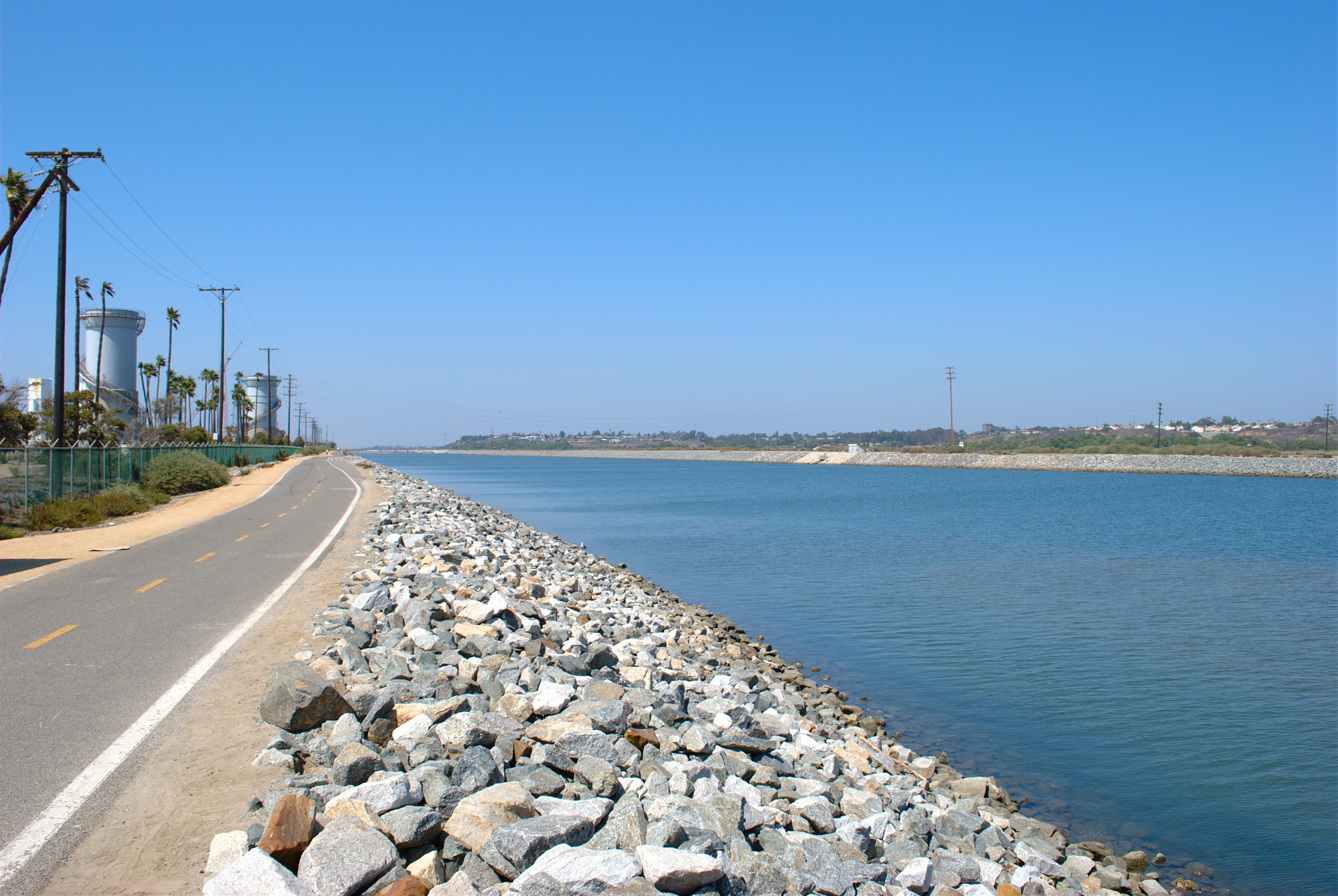
- A photo of the trail in Huntington Beach, looking upstream
- Length: 30 miles (48 km)
- Location: Orange and Riverside counties, California, United States
- Designation: National Recreation Trail
- Trailheads: Huntington State Beach; 33°37′54″N 117°57′31″W (southwest); SR 71 in Corona; 33°53′12″N 117°38′42″W (northeast)

The Santa Ana River Trail is a multi-use trail complex that runs alongside the Santa Ana River in southern California. The trail stretches 30 miles (48 km) from the Pacific Ocean at Huntington Beach along the Santa Ana River to the Orange–Riverside county line. Planned extensions of the trail reach to Big Bear Lake in San Bernardino County. When completed, it will be the longest multi-use trail in Southern California, at approximately 100 miles (160 km). In 1989, the Los Angeles Times described the path as "a veritable freeway for bicycles".

== Description ==
The asphalt-paved bike path is up to 12 feet (3.7 m) wide, divided into two lanes so cyclists may ride abreast in many portions, adjacent to a hiking & riding trail. Many intersections with local streets are grade separated with bridges or underpasses making it a Class I bicycle facility. Cyclists must yield to pedestrians and runners (who are considered pedestrians by the law) at all times. As of 2006, 70 miles (110 km) of the path were complete; when finished, in conjunction with the equestrian trail, the bikeway is expected to bridge three counties, touching on 17 cities and two national forests.

== History ==
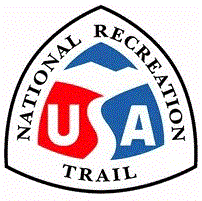
National Recreation Trail

In 1977, the bike path was designated a National Recreation Trail.

In 2005, heavy rains caused extensive erosion on the path, requiring repairs from the state at about $1 million, part of an approximately $43 million clean-up in Southern California occasioned by the disaster.

=== Events ===
Since 1985, the trail is the avenue of the annual "Riverside to Surfside" bicycling event, formerly known as "Smog to Surf", in which cyclists ride the trail from Riverside, Corona or Anaheim to Huntington Beach.

=== Safety ===
In 1990, safety on the trail became a concern when it was occupied by homeless populations and street gangs. An increased police presence in 2009 led to a reduction in crime, though pockets of homeless camps have reappeared under some bridges along the trail.

From early 2016 into autumn 2017, the presence of tent camps along a 6.5-mile stretch centered near Angel Stadium resulted in many riders feeling uncomfortable. At the end of 2017, the trail was closed as authorities with the assistance of social service agencies removed those camping along the trail. As of April 2018, the trail was cleared of the remains of the encampments and reopened.

== See also ==
- List of Orange County bike paths
- The Bicycle Tree
