= Park Tool =

U.S. bicycle repair tool and equipment company

Park Tool Company
- Type: Private
- Industry: Manufacturing
- Founded: June 1963; 63 years ago
- Founders: Howard C. Hawkins; Art Engstrom
- Headquarters: Oakdale, Minnesota, U.S.
- Key people: Eric Hawkins; Sara Carlson
- Products: Bicycle tools
- Website: www.parktool.com

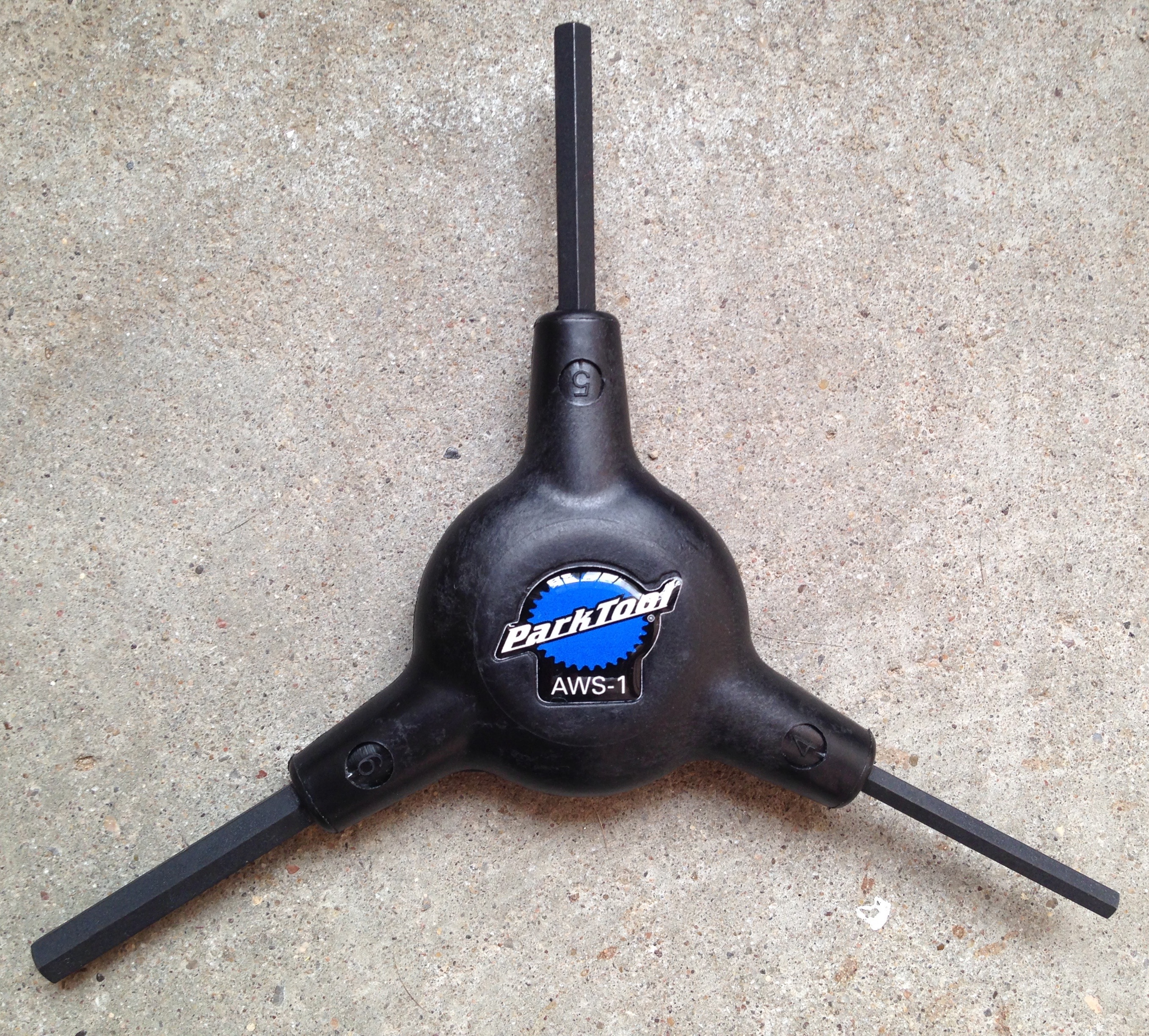
The Park Tool AWS-1 three-way hex wrench

Park Tool Company is an American designer, manufacturer and marketer of bicycle tools and equipment for both professional and home bicycle mechanics. It manufactures about 4000 products.

== History ==
In 1963, Howard C. Hawkins and Art Engstrom were the owners of Park Schwinn, a bicycle shop in the Hazel Park area of Saint Paul, Minnesota. They noticed that there were no tools available to repair the increasingly complex bicycles of the 1960s, so they began creating their own tools. The first was a stand that held the bike off the ground allowing convenient access to any part of the bike. Other area bike shops and Schwinn Bicycle Company liked the stands and requested a production model. Soon after, the company expanded to include wheel truing stands, then expanded further into consumer wrenches and gauges. By the early 1980s, Hawkins and Engstrom were perennial top ten Schwinn dealers with three stores but sold their bicycle shops to focus their efforts on the tool business. Art Engstrom has retired, and Howard Hawkins died in 2015. Park Tool is owned and operated by Eric Hawkins, Howard Hawkins' son, and now offers more than 500 bicycle repair tools in its line.

== Patents ==
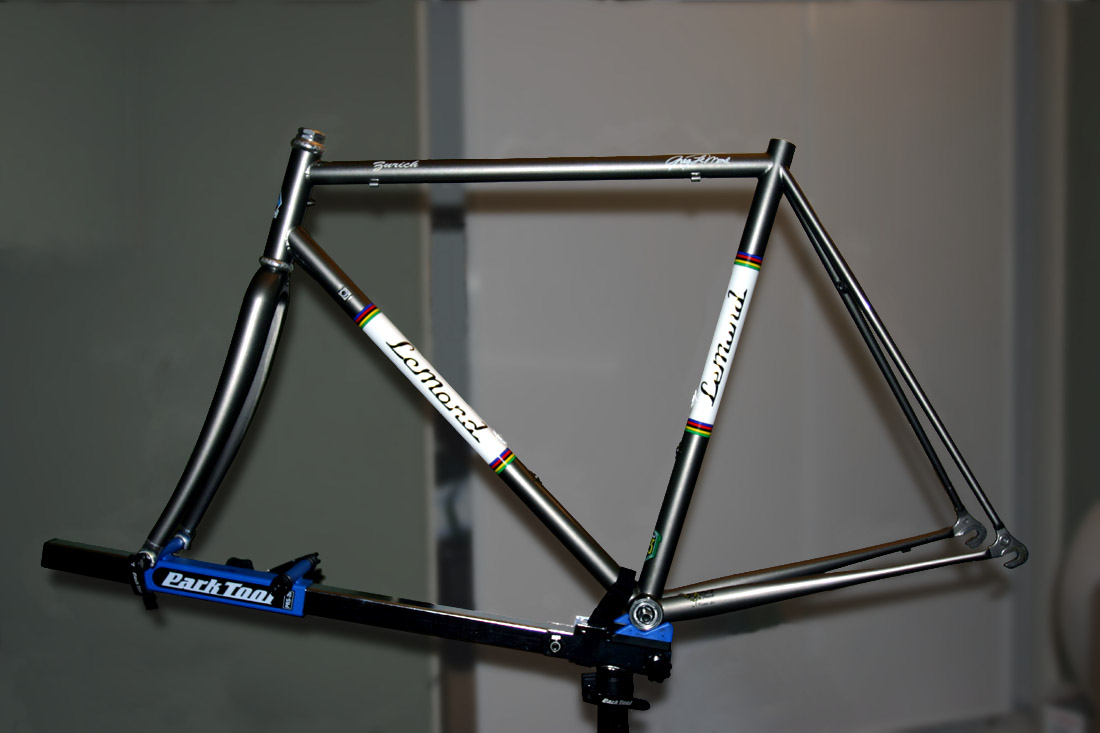
A Park Tool bicycle work stand

The founders of Park Tool along with James E. Johnson developed a clamping device on their original bike repair stand, for which they received a United States Patent in 1976. The company has applied for and has been granted many patents since then, including a pizza cutter shaped like a penny-farthing. and several patents for bicycle specific repair tools.

== Color ==
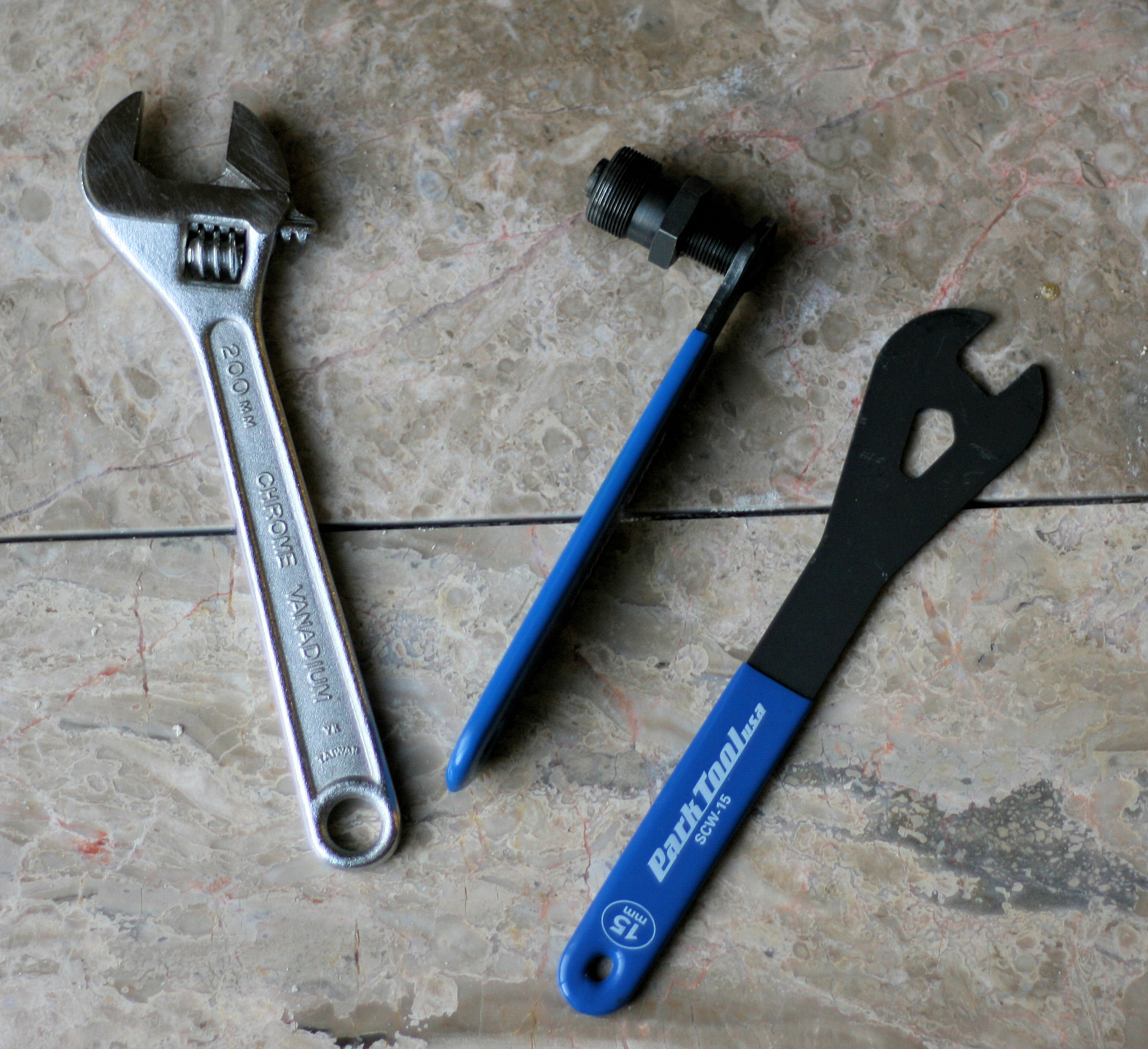
A Park Tool crank extractor and cone wrench (with a non-Park Tool adjustable wrench)

Park Tool products typically incorporate blue into their design. Handles are frequently colored blue but some tools are colored differently so as to avoid confusion between different tools of otherwise similar appearance. This is the case with the square-taper crank puller (CCP-22, blue) and the splined crank puller (CCP-44, black). Similarly the AWS-10 folding hex wrench set has a traditional Park blue handle, while the visually very similar TWS-2 folding Torx wrench set is supplied in bright green. The color blue is a registered trademark of the company.

== See also ==
- Lezyne
