= Wheel truing stand =

Tool for aligning bicycle wheels

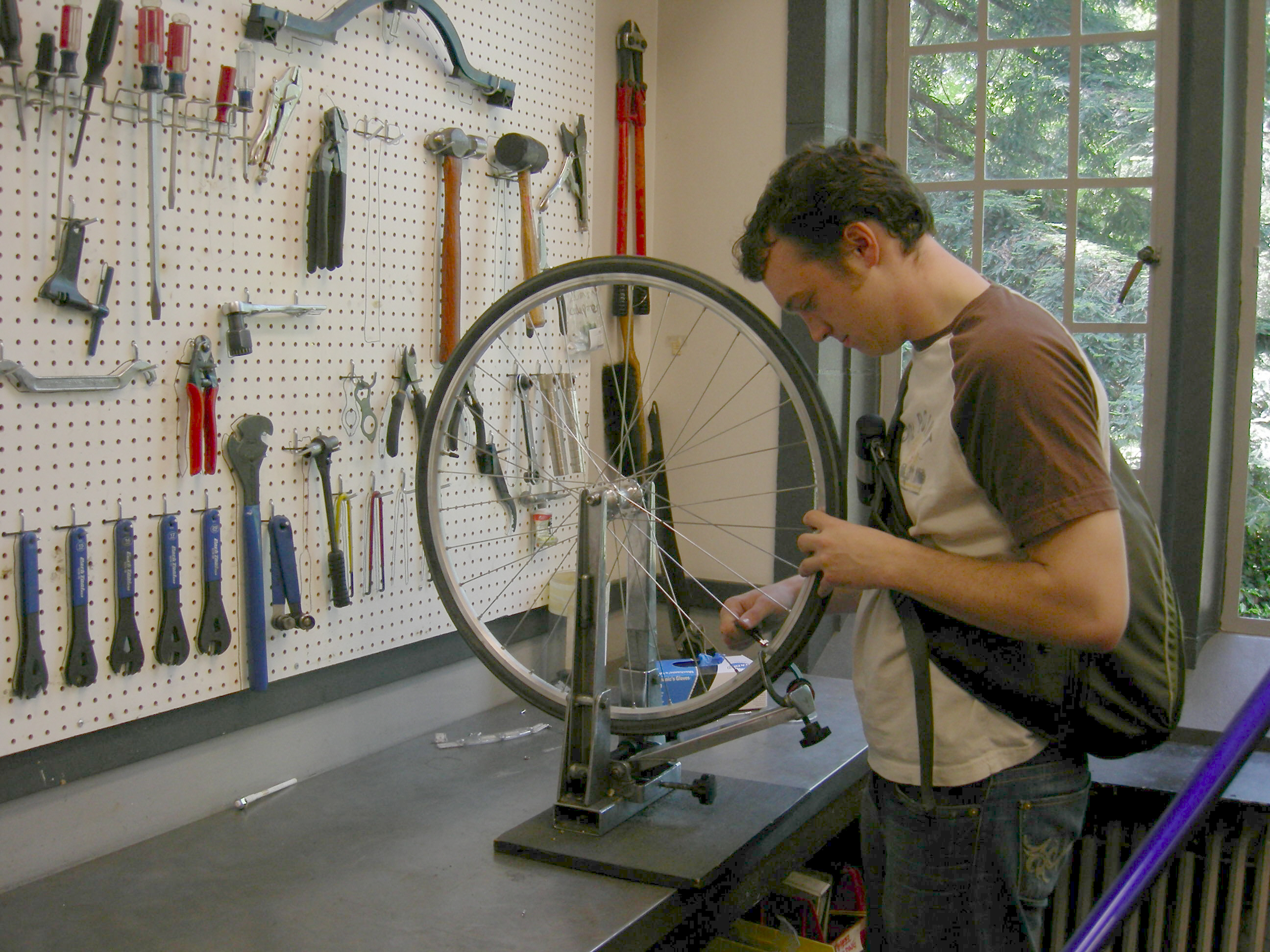
Two-armed wheel truing stand

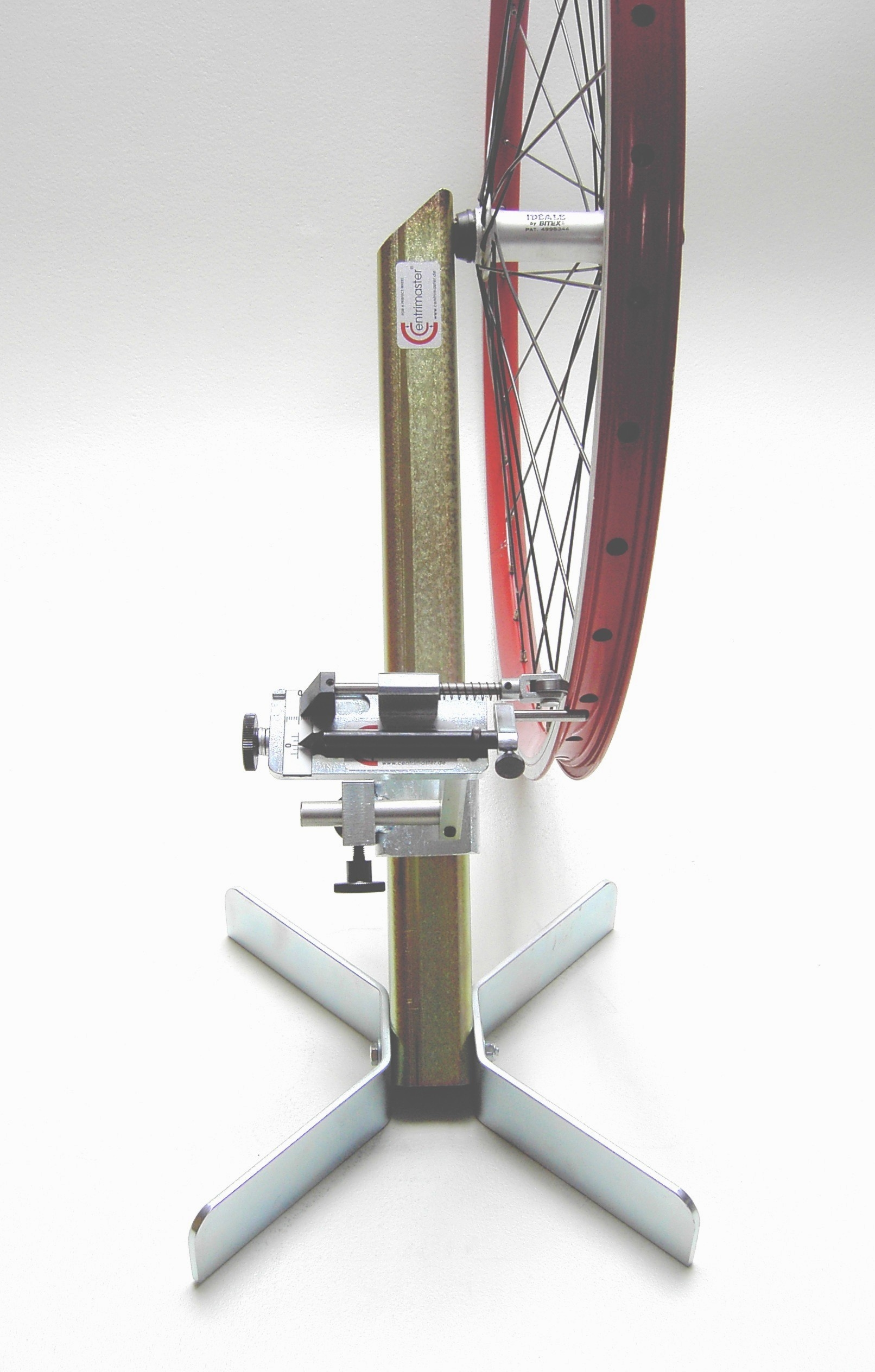
One-armed wheel truing stand

A wheel truing stand is a specialized tool for "truing" (straightening) bicycle wheels. They generally comprise an axle stand on which the wheel can rotate and calipers, to measure slight deviations of the wheel's rim from ideal alignment. Proper wheel alignment includes lateral, radial and dish/centering trues which keep the wheel straight and strong. The stand is used in conjunction with an appropriately sized spoke wrench to loosen or tighten the spokes that connect the wheel's hub to the rim.

== Types of wheel trues ==
All types of wheel trues are necessary when keeping a wheel strong. Proper spoke tensions will help a wheel snap back to true if under specific load.

- Lateral: Measures the rim horizontally in order to keep the rim straight.
- Radial: Measures the rims diameter to keep the wheel circular (also known as eliminating hops).
- Dish/Centering: Centers the rim above the hub; dish tool is used to measure centering.

All wheels are measured by KGF or Kilogram - force. For rear wheel truing the rear wheel is going to have tighter spoke on the drive side while when truing front wheels the brake side spokes are going to be tighter than the drive side spokes.

== Wheel truing tools ==
Directions to turn spoke nipples to true a wheel

Along with the wheel truing stand there are other tools that are involved in straightening bicycle wheels. Some of these tools are listed below.

- Spoke tension meter: used to measure the tension of different sized spokes (outboard spokes must be turned to the left to tighten and right to loosen)
- Dish tool: Used to measure the centering of the rim to the hub
- Spoke wrench: used to turn spoke nipples in order to loosen or tighten spokes
- Truing Stand Extensions: clamps onto Park Tools truing stands which expands the range of wheel sizes

== Home-made truing stands ==
These truing stands use many different kinds of materials to achieve similar quality as ones found in a shop. These materials can include wood, old wheel forks, and metal rails. While cost effective, these wheels are often not as precise as wheels made by a well-known bike tool manufacturers.

== Industry truing stands ==
High-quality truing stands are necessary for the professional industry. High-quality truing stands allow the user for fast and easy accessibility when truing a wheel. Professional truing stands enable the tools to be used more accurately when measuring all types of truing methods. Not only do professional truing stands accommodate accuracy, but they can also hold a wide variety of wheel sizes ranging from 12″ wheels to 29″ wheels.

== See also ==
- Bicycle tools
- List of bicycle parts
- Howard C. Hawkins patented several truing stands.
