= Lezyne =

American bicycle accessory manufacturer

- Company type: Private
- Industry: Cycling
- Founded: March 1, 2007; 19 years ago
- Headquarters: Reno, Nevada, U.S.
- Products: Bells; Bicycle Lights; Bicycle Tools; GPS Cyclocomputers; Multi-Tools; Pumps; Seat Bags
- Number of employees: 100-200
- Website: Ride.Lezyne.com

Lezyne is a manufacturer of bicycle accessories headquartered in Reno, Nevada, with offices in San Luis Obispo, Berlin and Taichung. The company is known for producing pumps, multi-tools, saddle bags, bottle cages, lights and GPS cyclocomputers. Most of their products are manufactured in-house at their factory in Taichung, Taiwan. In addition to selling products in the aftermarket, Lezyne is an original equipment manufacturer for electric bicycle lights.

== History ==
Lezyne was founded by Micki Kozuschek on March 1, 2007. The original product line consisted of hand pumps, multi-tools, tire repair items, saddle bags and hydration packs.

In 2011, Lezyne released a lineup of LED bicycle lights.

In 2015, the company announced their first line of GPS cycling computers along with a supporting mobile app and data analysis website.

In 2018, Lezyne won three Design & Innovation Awards for their Classic Brass Bell, Digital Micro Floor Drive HV pump, and Laser Drive taillight.

In 2019, Lezyne released a mobile app which can be used to wirelessly control and program select LED lights.

== Sponsorship ==
In addition to manufacturing accessories, Lezyne also supports and receives product feedback from notable cycling teams and individual athletes including:

- Danny Macaskill
- Cédric Gracia
- Lotto Soudal
- AG2R La Mondiale Pro Cycling Team
- Alison Tetrick
- Team DSM
- And others

== See also ==
- Park Tool
