= Bike shop =

Business specializing in bicycles

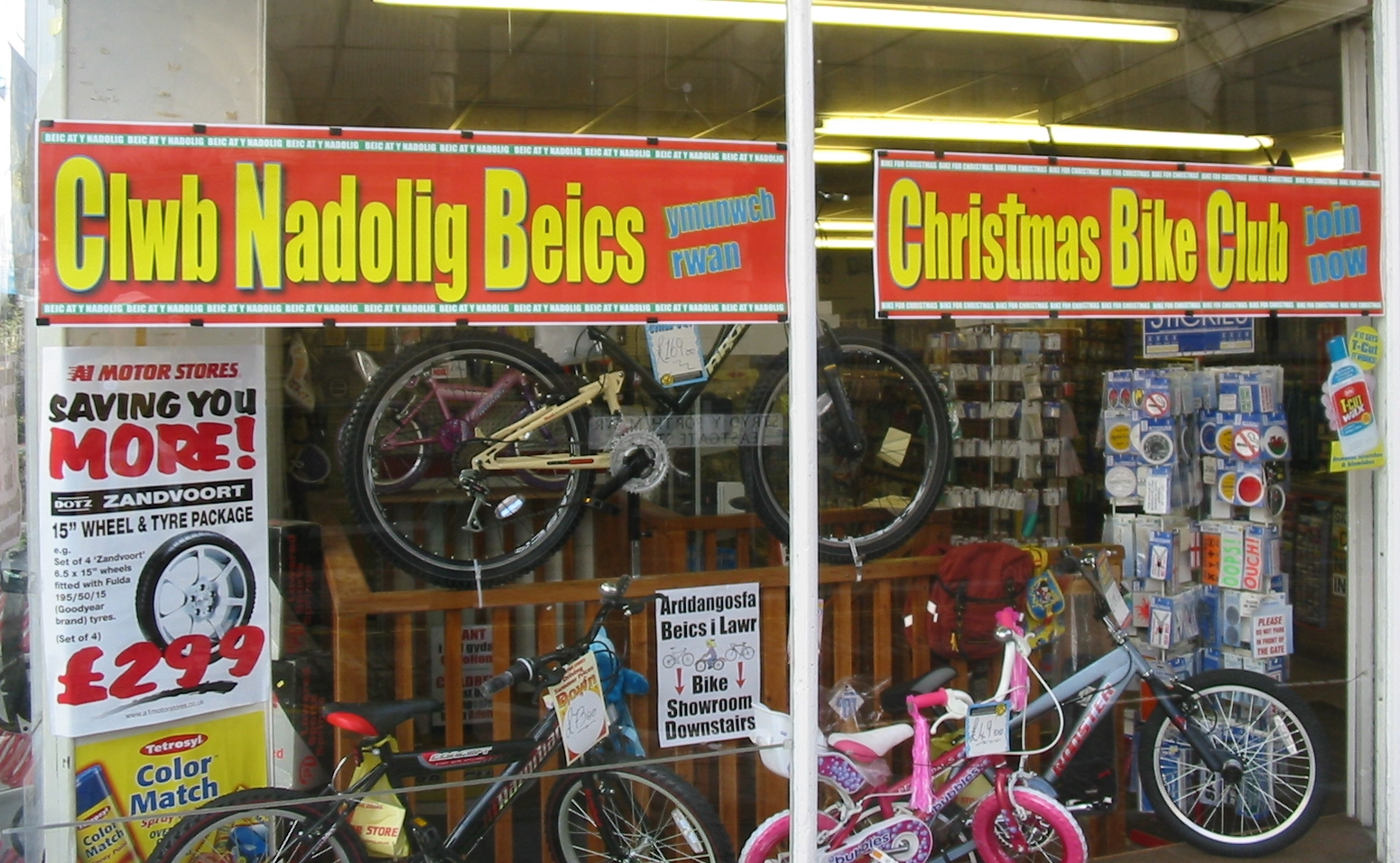
A local bike shop

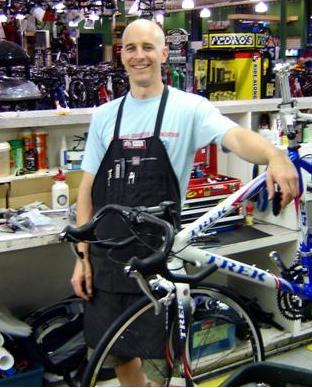
A bicycle mechanic at a local bike shop

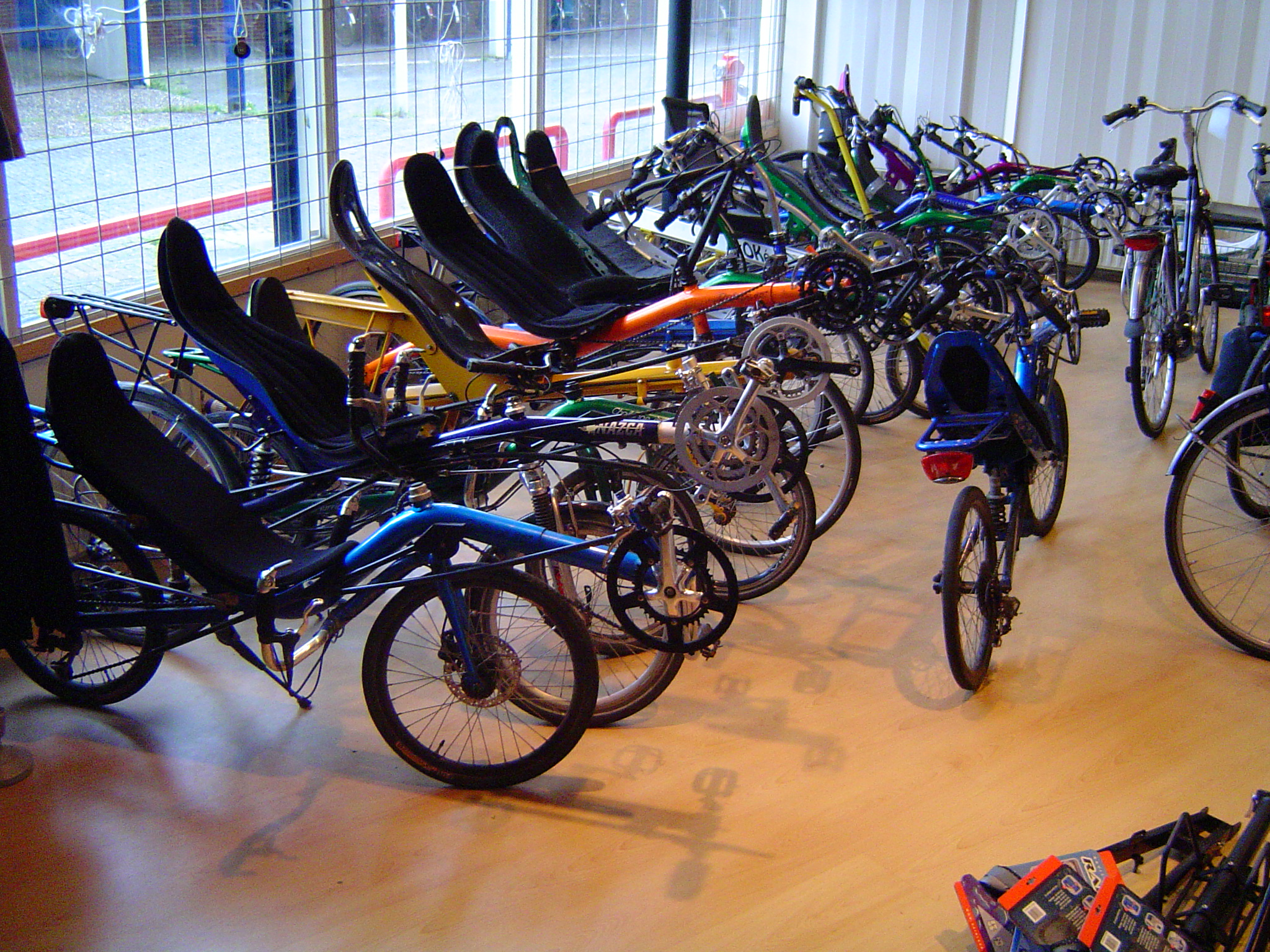
View of recumbent bicycles inside a local bike shop

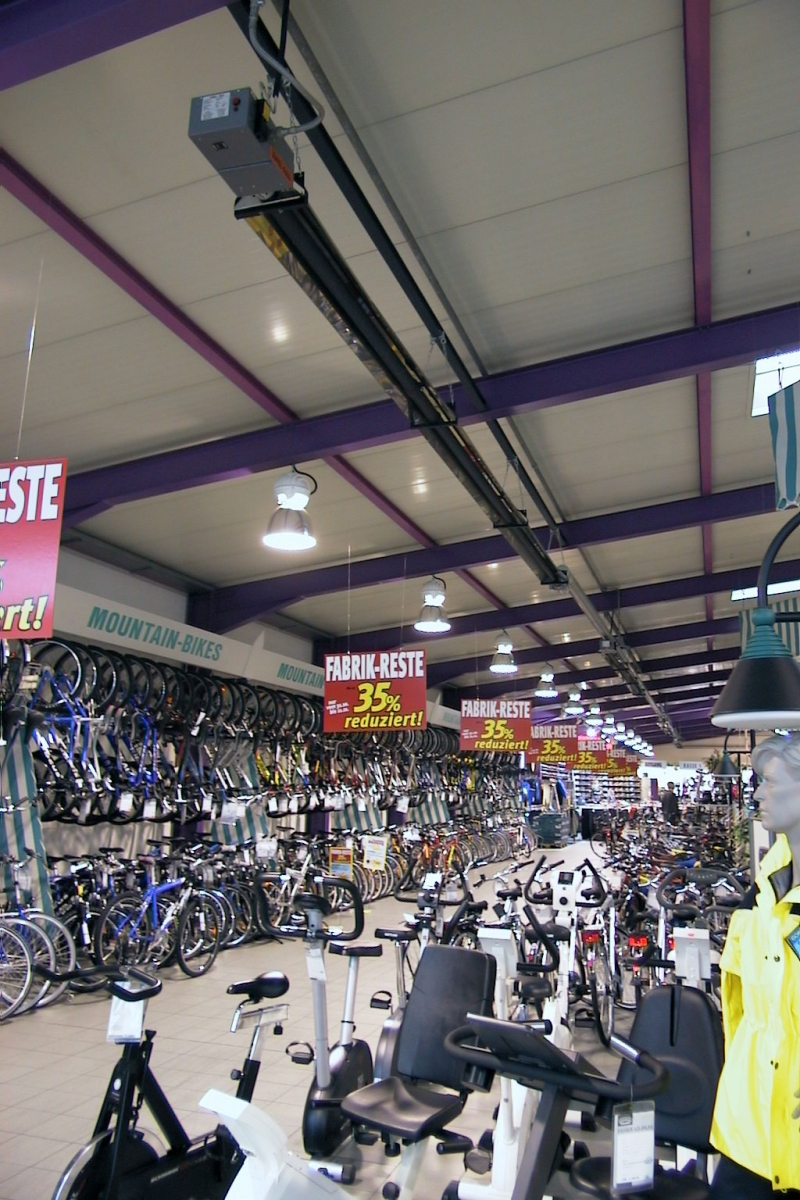
Bicycles and exercise equipment for sale inside a local bike shop

A bike shop or bicycle shop is a business specializing in bicycle sales, maintenance bike parts and accessories. Bike shops may be small businesses, Chain stores, mail-order or online vendors. Local bike shops (sometimes abbreviated LBS) are a key component of the bicycle industry as they provide repair and service in addition to retail sales. In recognition of the value that local bike shops provide, some manufacturers only sell their bicycles through dealerships. In the UK and Ireland, the expression independent bicycle dealers (IBDs) is also used. Shops may also specialize on one or more aspects of cycling: bicycle racing, triathlon, bicycle touring, BMX, mountain biking, etc.

== Offerings ==
Beyond bicycles, a bike shop may offer clothing and other accessories, spare and replacement parts, tools, and a variety of services. Services may include expert fitting and custom bike building or ordering, maintenance and repairs from experienced bicycle mechanics, and organized group rides and classes. A self-service work area may be available.

Shops may also specialize on one or more aspects of cycling: bicycle racing, triathlon, bicycle touring, BMX, mountain biking, etc. Similarly, shops may carry a diverse range of bicycles, from single-seat upright bikes, to more specialized types such as tandem bicycles, recumbent bicycles, folding bicycles. Many shops also carry related items such as unicycles and skateboards.

Shops located out of temperate climates may have a secondary line in order to keep busy in the off season (winter). These include goods and services for skiing, camping, and physical fitness. Some shops keep their regular customers coming in through the winter by offering group training sessions.

== Studios ==
A small but growing trend in bicycle retailing is called the bicycle studio, or garage shop in the United States, which offers service in an intimate environment by appointment only. A list by Bicycling Magazine shows five studios founded before 2000 and 13 since. These are seen as more complementary to, than competitive with, traditional bike shops.

== Competition ==
In the US, the primary competitors to local bike shops are the mass merchants such as Walmart or Target, representing 74% of the units sales in 2015 and 32% of dollars spent, chain sporting goods stores representing 6% of the unit sales and 8% of dollars spent, and outdoor speciality retailers representing 3.5% of the unit sales and 8% of dollars spent. Approximately 4,000 speciality bicycle retailers, which include local bike shops, command approximately 13% of the bicycle market in terms of unit sales in 2015, but 49% of the dollars spent on bikes.

There are also chains of bike shops, though most LBS are independently owned, and 91% of them have one location.

The distinction between local bike shops and online vendors has begun to blur as local bike shops have begun themselves to sell products online.

A recent development is the introduction of brand specific stores from bicycle manufacturers such as Trek Bicycle Corporation. Other manufacturers, such as Specialized, are strengthening their channels with concept stores.

== Statistics ==
According to the National Bicycle Dealers Association, in 2007 there were approximately 4,400 "specialty bicycle retailers" in the USA; down from 4,800 in 2005. Although they sold only 17% of the bikes, up from 16% in 2005, they collected 49% of the dollars, up from 47% in 2005. In 2004, the average specialty bicycle retailer had gross sales of $550,000 per year, 91% of them had one location, and average store size was 4,822 square feet.

== See also ==
- Bicycle
- Bicycle cooperative
- Bicycle industry
- Bicycle mechanic
- Bicycle tools
- Cycling
- List of bicycle manufacturers
- List of bicycle part manufacturers
