= Howard Hawkins =

Howard Hawkins may refer to:

- Howie Hawkins (born 1952), American politician and activist
- Howard Hawkins (businessman) (1932–2015), American bicycle tools maker
