= The Bicycle Tree =

Bicycle cooperative in Santa Ana, California

- Type: Bicycle cooperative
- Industry: Bicycle industry
- Founded: Anaheim, California (2006; 20 years ago)
- Founder: Paul Nagel; Hector Madrigal-Ramirez; Gina Marzolo
- Headquarters: Santa Ana, California, United States
- Number of locations: 1 store
- Area served: Santa Ana; Orange County, California
- Services: Bicycle repair; Sales of bicycles and cycling accessories; Bicycle repair and safety classes
- Website: thebicycletree.org

The Bicycle Tree is a non-profit, bicycle cooperative workspace in Santa Ana, California.

== History ==
The Bicycle Tree was founded as a bicycle cooperative in 2006 by Paul Nagel, Hector Madrigal-Ramirez, and Gina Marzolo with initial bike repair operations running out of a home in Anaheim. The co-founders first came together to distribute food at La Palma Park in Anaheim, and through shared beliefs in the importance of non-motorized transportation and community, decided to offer accessible bike repair and maintenance services to local residents. According to co-founder Paul Nagel, bicycle cooperatives in the Los Angeles area, such as the Bicycle Kitchen, served as models for The Bicycle Tree. The Bicycle Tree operated from the Anaheim location for three years as a volunteer run organization, before transitioning to mobile bicycle clinics in Santa Ana and Orange.

In 2013, The Bicycle Tree launched a crowdfunding campaign to open a storefront. In 2014, the organization opened its first storefront on Main St. in Downtown Santa Ana. That same year, it also obtained non-profit status.

In 2017, The Bicycle Tree relocated to a storefront on 17th St. in Santa Ana to accommodate increased demand for its services.

== Programs ==
The Bicycle Tree is a nonprofit, cooperative bicycle shop that offers low-cost bicycle repair, maintenance services, bicycle parts and tool access for the community of Orange County. Staff and volunteers teach patrons how to repair their own bicycles. They organization offers classes on bicycle safety and maintenance, organizes community group rides and has donated bicycles to organizations such as the Mercy House. It has also collaborated with local community organizations like Santa Ana Active Streets to promote cycling.
