= Cycling team =

Organizational unit consisting of cyclists and supporting personnel

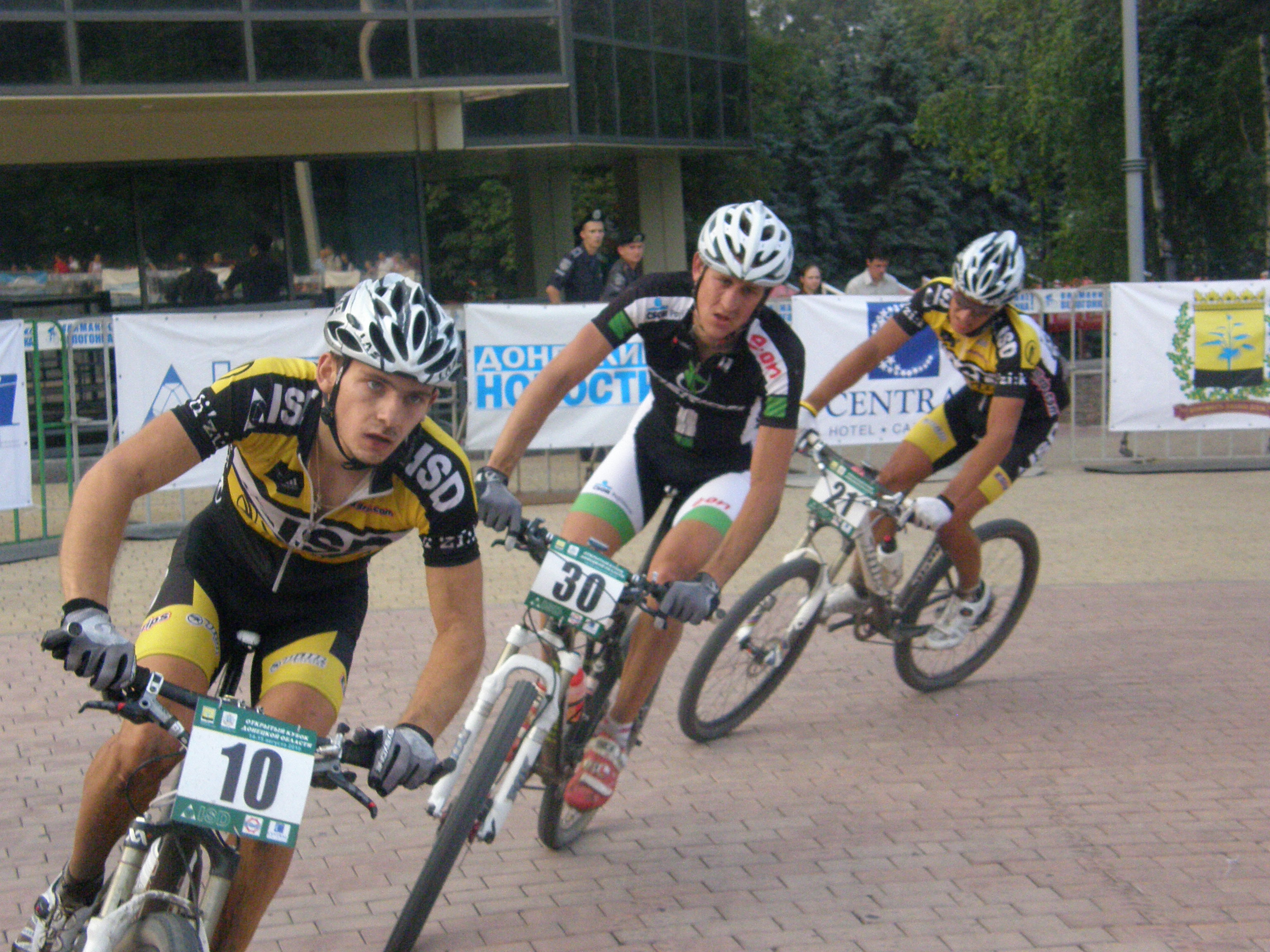
ISD Continental Team in Donetsk, Ukraine

A cycling team is a group of cyclists who join a team or are acquired and train together to compete in bicycle races whether amateur or professional – and the supporting personnel. Cycling teams are most important in road bicycle racing, which is a team sport, but collaboration between team members is also important in track cycling and cyclo-cross.

== Composition ==
While riders form the core of a team, a top team also has personnel who support the racing and training. These include

- A manager, who oversees the team's commitments, sponsorships, and general operations.
- Directeurs sportifs, who travel to races and dictate the racing strategy. In bigger teams they often drive team cars and have radio contact with the riders.
- Coaches, who direct the team's training.
- Doctors are responsible for riders' well-being and often make sure the riders meet regulations such as those related to doping.
- Therapists, who assist the coaches.
- Soigneurs, who are assistants responsible for feeding, clothing, massaging, and escorting riders; from the French (pronounced [swa.ɲœʁ]) for "one who provides care."
- Mechanics, who are responsible for the team's equipment.

There are also officers for sponsorship, marketing, and communication.

== Levels of commitment ==
There are different levels of commitment between the riders and the team. Amateur teams range from a collection of riders who identify themselves as a team to those who provide riders with equipment and money. A top-level professional team is registered with the Union Cycliste Internationale, which enforces rules and a points system for professional competition.

== Road cycling ==
Team members have different specializations. Climbing specialists grind away on hard inclines; sprinters save their energy for sprints for points and position; time trialists keep speed high over great distances.

Each team has a leader and captain, generally reckoned as the team's most experienced rider. The leaders have the most media exposure and the best chance of winning races. The rest of the team's members are domestiques, or secondary riders, who shield the leader from opponents and deliver food and drinks to him. However, any team member is allowed to go for a stage win.

In one-day races, one or several leaders are chosen according to demands of the race. In stage races, teams focus on different goals. For example, during the 2005 Tour de France teams such as Discovery Channel or T-Mobile focused on the general classification while other teams tried to win stages or one of the other classifications. In the 2004 Tour de France, Quick-Step–Davitamon helped Richard Virenque win the mountains classification while Lotto–Domo helped Robbie McEwen win the points classification. Smaller teams may simply get riders into a long breakaway to get coverage on television. Most professional teams have 10-20 riders.

Teams are generally sponsored in exchange for advertising on clothing and other endorsements. Sponsorship ranges from small businesses to international companies.

The Tour de France between 1930 and the late 1950s was for national teams which carried no prominent commercial advertising.

== See also ==
- UCI ProTour
- Road bicycle racing
- Stage race
- List of UCI Professional Continental and Continental teams
