= Bicycle tools =

Tools specifically for working on bicycles

The term bicycle tools typically refers to specialty tools used on bicycles, as opposed to general purpose mechanical tools. such as spanners and hex wrenches. Various bicycle tools have evolved over the years into specialized tools for working on a bicycle. Modern bicycle shops will stock a large number of tools for working on different bicycle parts. This work can be performed by a trained bicycle mechanic, or for simple tasks, by the bicycle owner.

== Various tools by function ==
=== Hub, wheel and tire tools ===
- Tire levers are used for removing the tires from the rim, often for changing the inner tube. Plastic levers are more prone to breakage; metal ones damage tubes, tires, or rims more easily.
- Cone wrenches (spanners) are needed to dismantle and adjust the hub bearings.
- Spoke wrenches are used for tensioning the spokes of a wheel.
- Tensiometer or spoke tension meter is used to measure the tension in spokes.
- Tire bead jack can be used to install tires on rims, especially when the tire-rim combination is tight.
- Dishing gauge is used to measure the dish of a wheel.
- Wheel truing stand is used to measure the side to side and radial trueness of a wheel's rim and facilitate truing it.
- Bicycle pump
- Pressure gauge is used to measure tire pressure.
Hub, wheel and tire tools

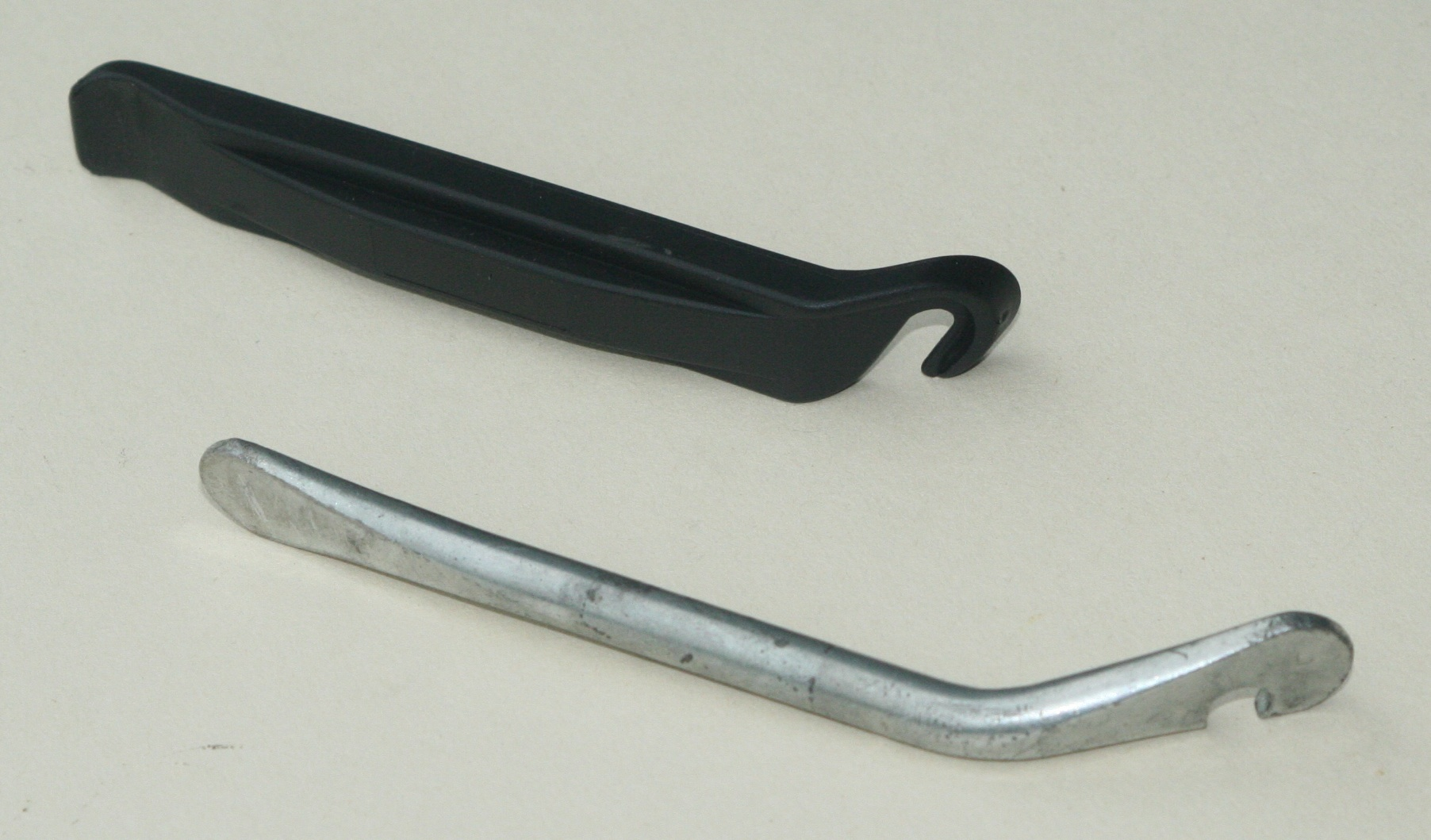
Metal and plastic tire levers

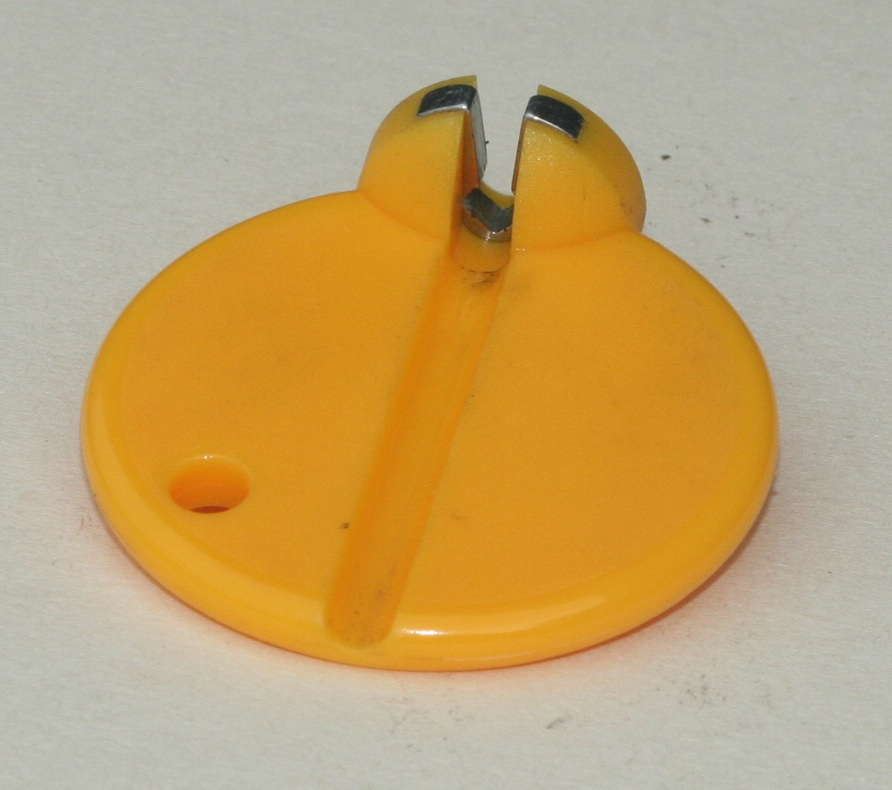
Spokey spoke key

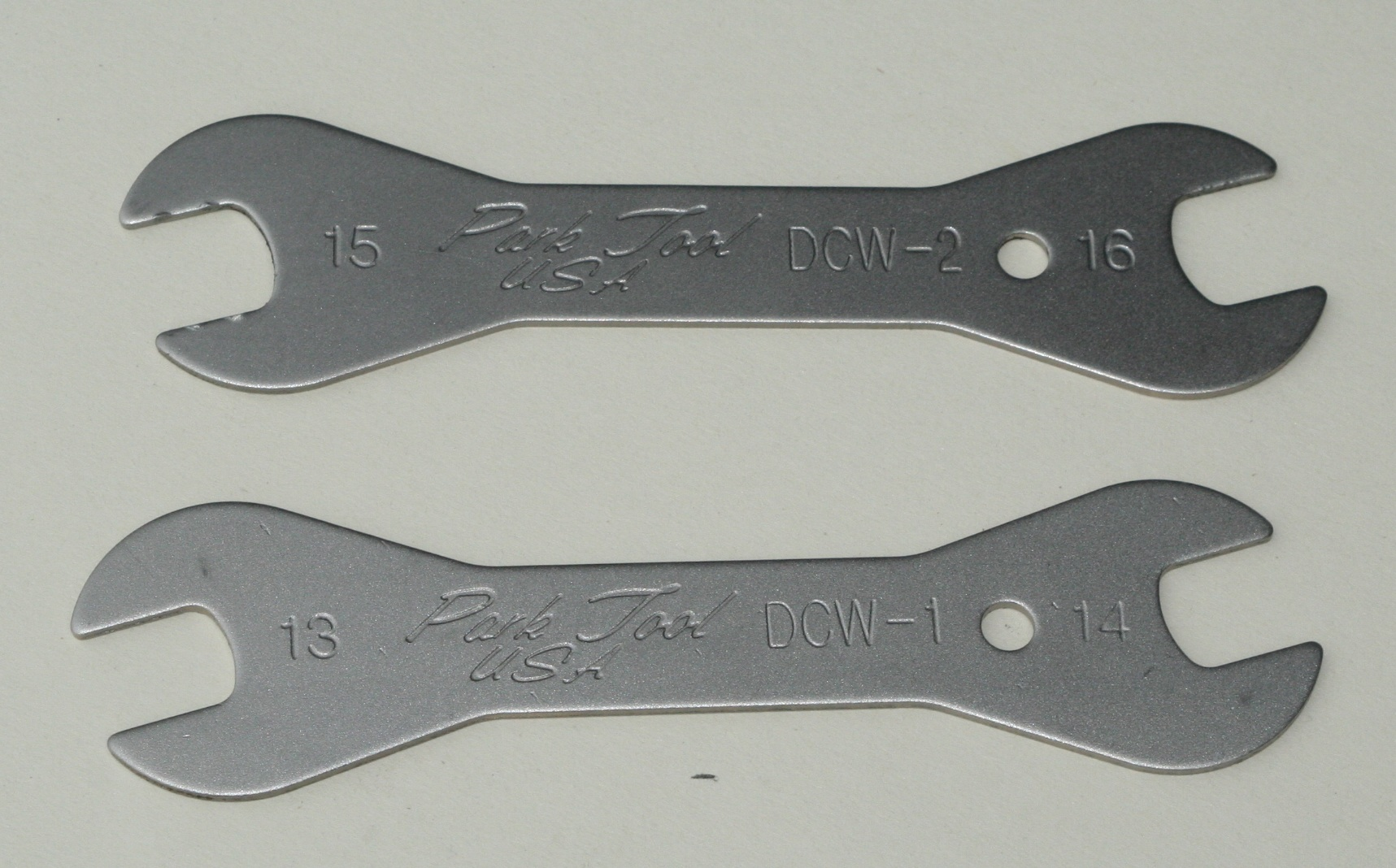
Double-ended cone wrenches, 13 & 16 mm

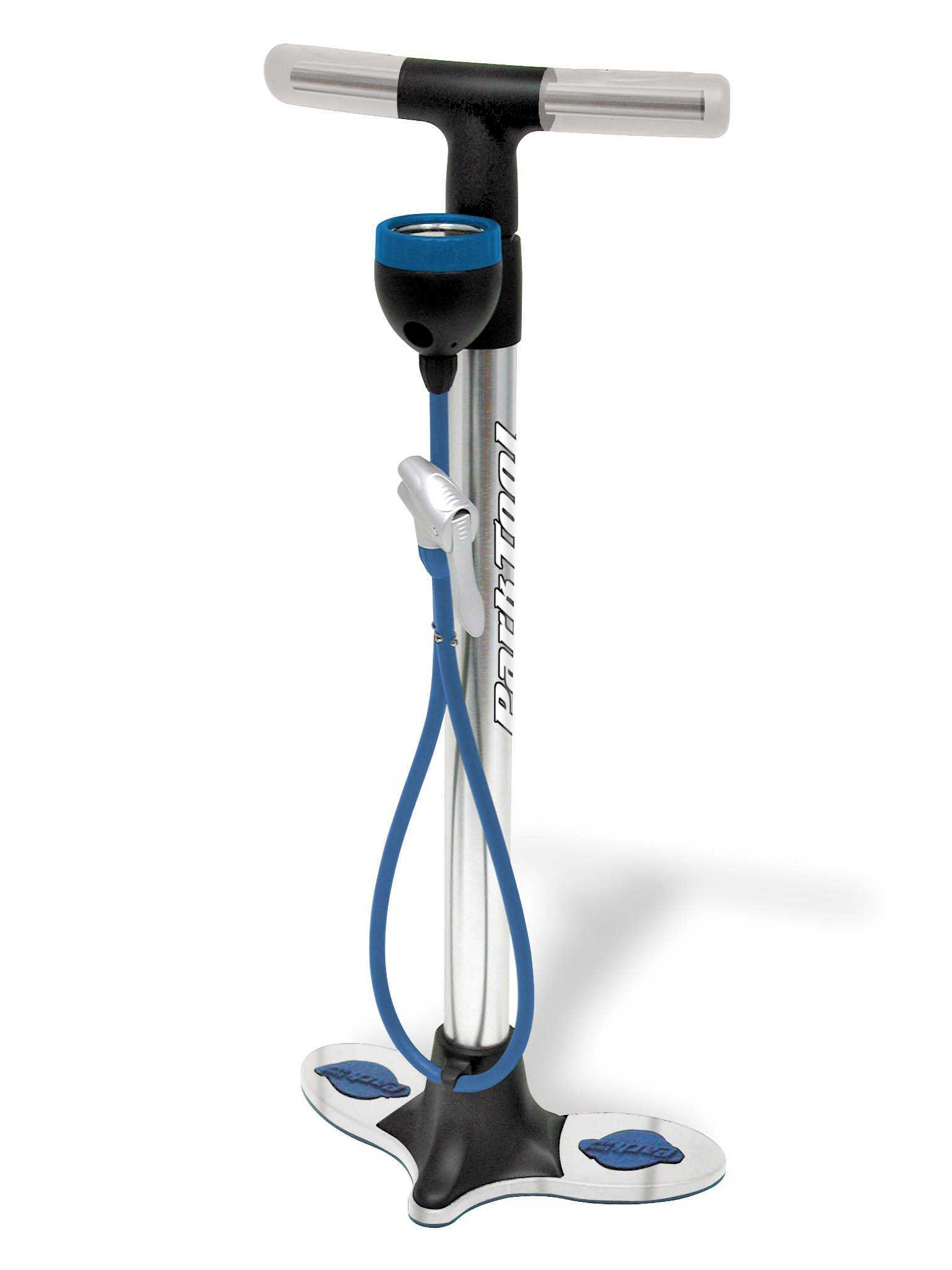
Bicycle floor pump

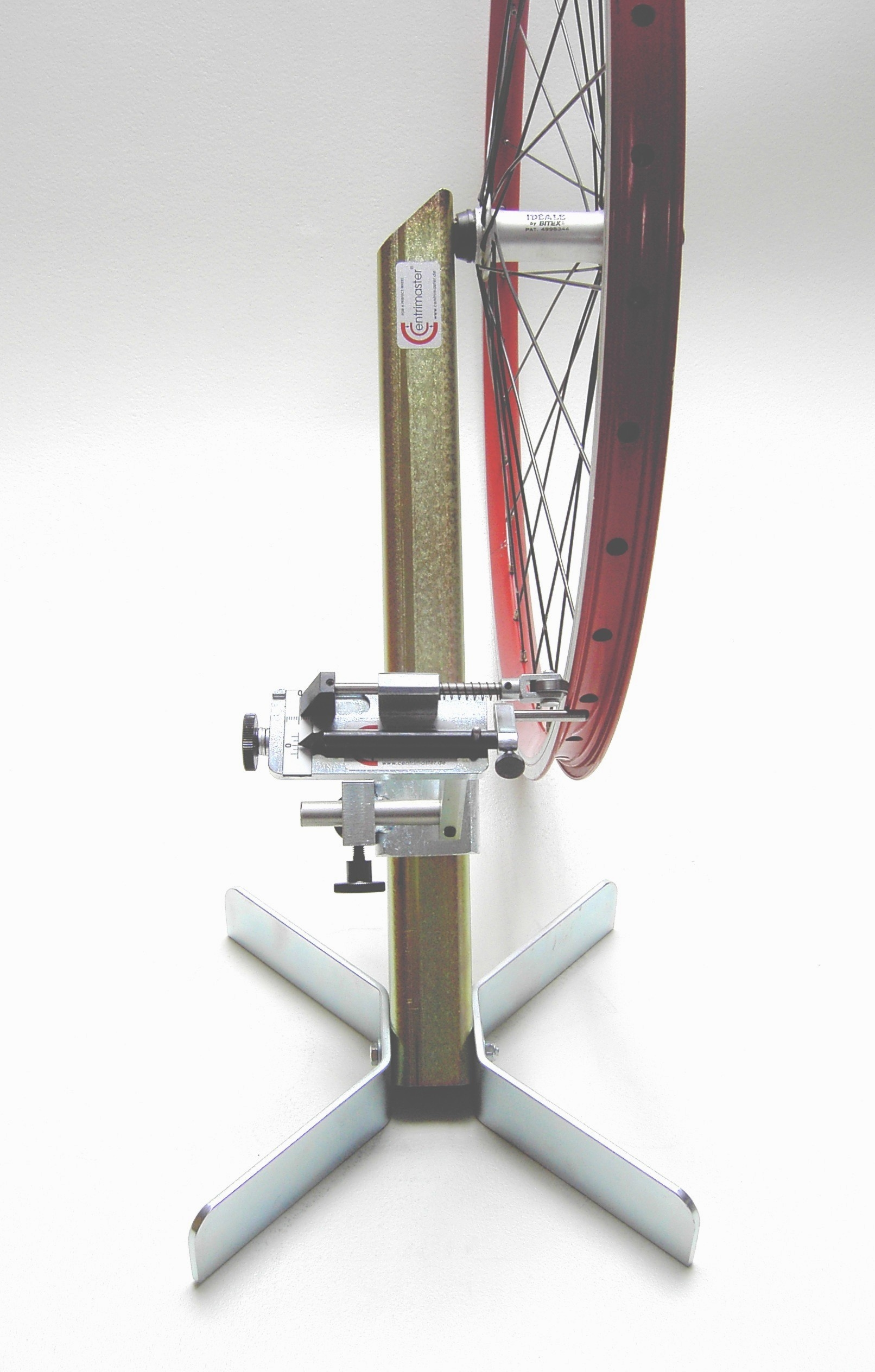
One-armed wheel truing stand

=== Brake tools ===
- Cable and housing cutters
- Cable tensioning tool to hold the cables taut while being worked on.
- Third hand or 3rd hand to clamp brake pads against rim during adjustment.
- Rotor truing tool for aligning and straightening slightly bent bike disc brake rotors.

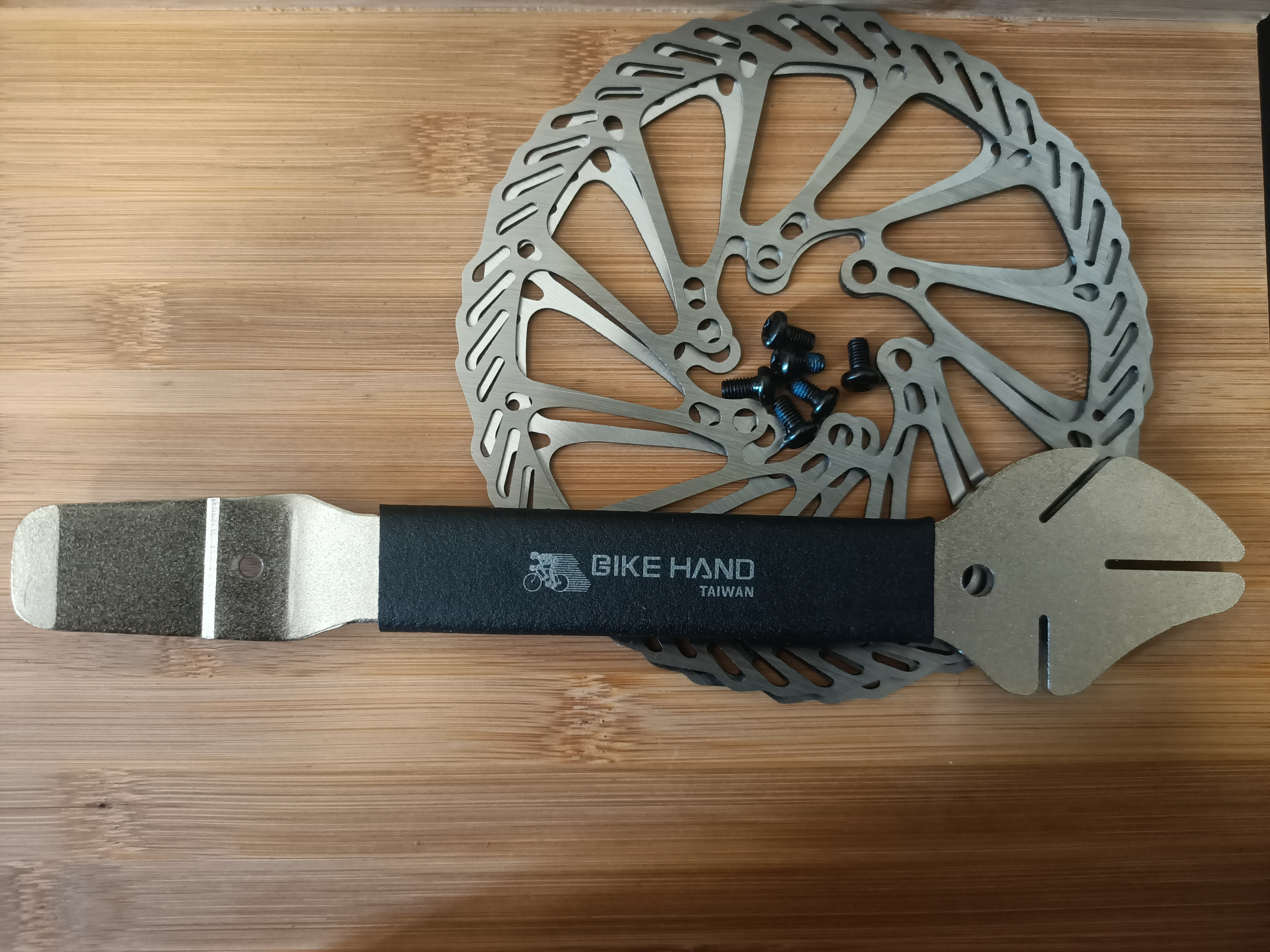
Photo of a rotor-truing fork with 160 mm bike disc brake rotors.

=== Headset tools ===
- A head tube facing and reaming tool is a hand tool used to machine the head tube to ensure proper headset bearing alignment. The tool usually has separate and interchangeable facing and reaming cutters which can vary widely with the many available headset standards.
- A headset bearing cup press is a bearing press specifically for pressing in interference-fit headset cups. Most sets come with special stepped bushings or adapters that contact the cups, preventing damage when installed. Some manufacturers (e.g. Chris King) also make proprietary adapters for installing their headsets.
- A crown race cutting tool is a hand tool used to counter-ream and face the base of the fork column at the crown (known as the crown race seat). A single cutter is usually used to perform both aspects of the cutting operation. The process machines the crown race seat to be precisely perpendicular to the steering column axis and of the correct press-fit diameter, ensuring the proper alignment of the crown race with the lower headset bearing.
- A crown race puller or remover is a tool for removing the headset crown race. There are various tools on the market ranging from less than US$100 to several hundreds of dollars.
- Headset wrenches are oversized (32 – 36 mm) flat open-end wrenches for tightening headset cups and lock nuts on threaded steering tubes. May be designed to contact 7 sides of an 8 sided (8-point) lock nut.
- Hex (or Allen) keys are used on the various hex bolts on the stem, top cap and handlebars.
- A star nut setter is used to set the star nut inside of the fork steering column for threadless headsets.

=== Drivetrain and bottom bracket tools ===
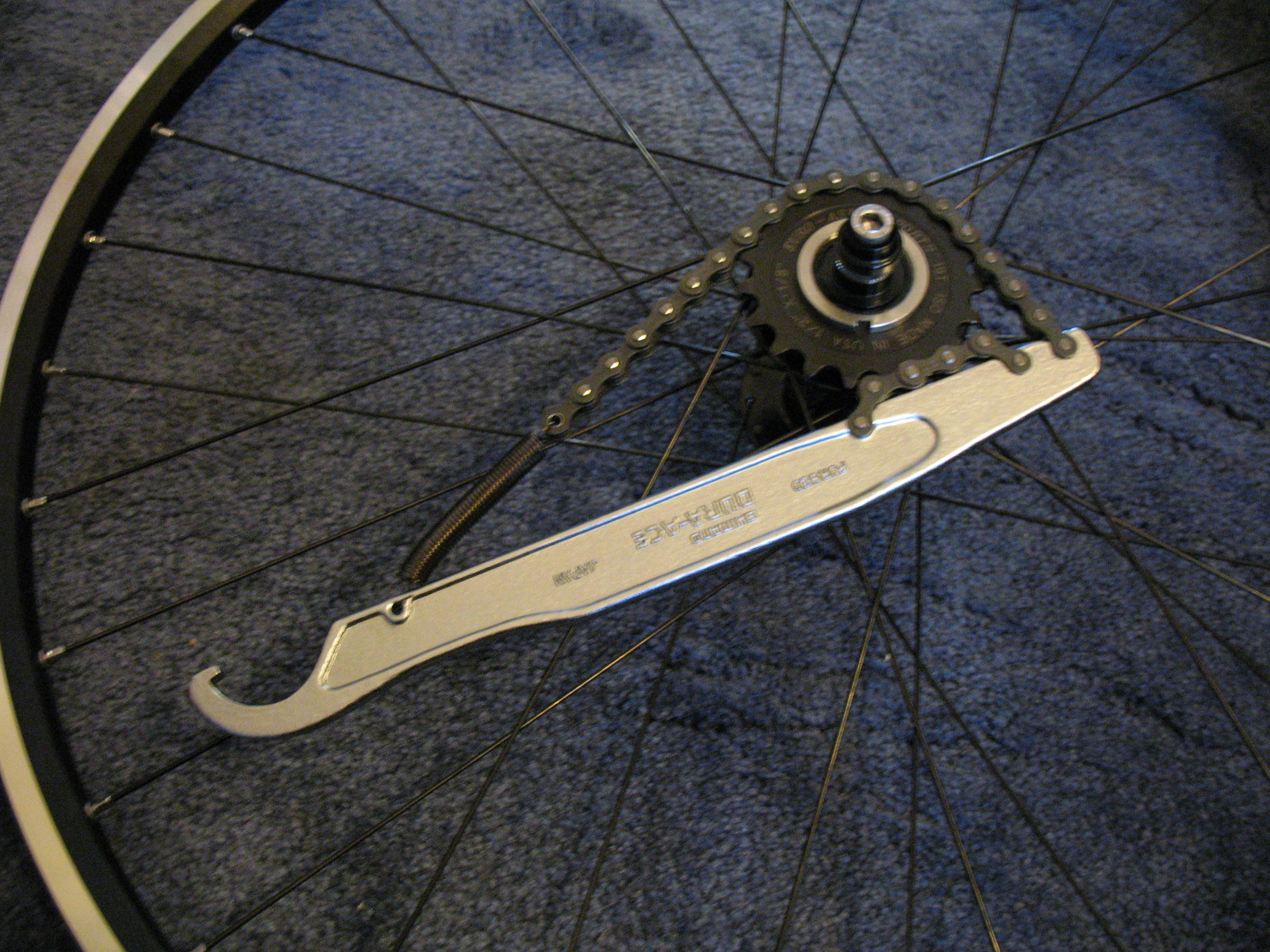
Track sprockets are typically attached and removed from the hub by screwing them with a chain whip. This tool also has a lockring spanner for securing a reverse threaded lockring against the sprocket.

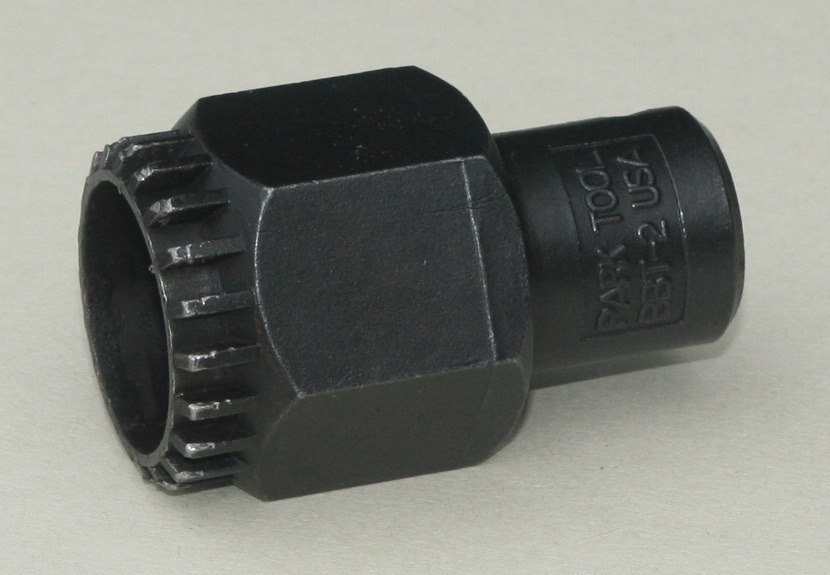
Bottom bracket wrench for newer bottom bracket styles

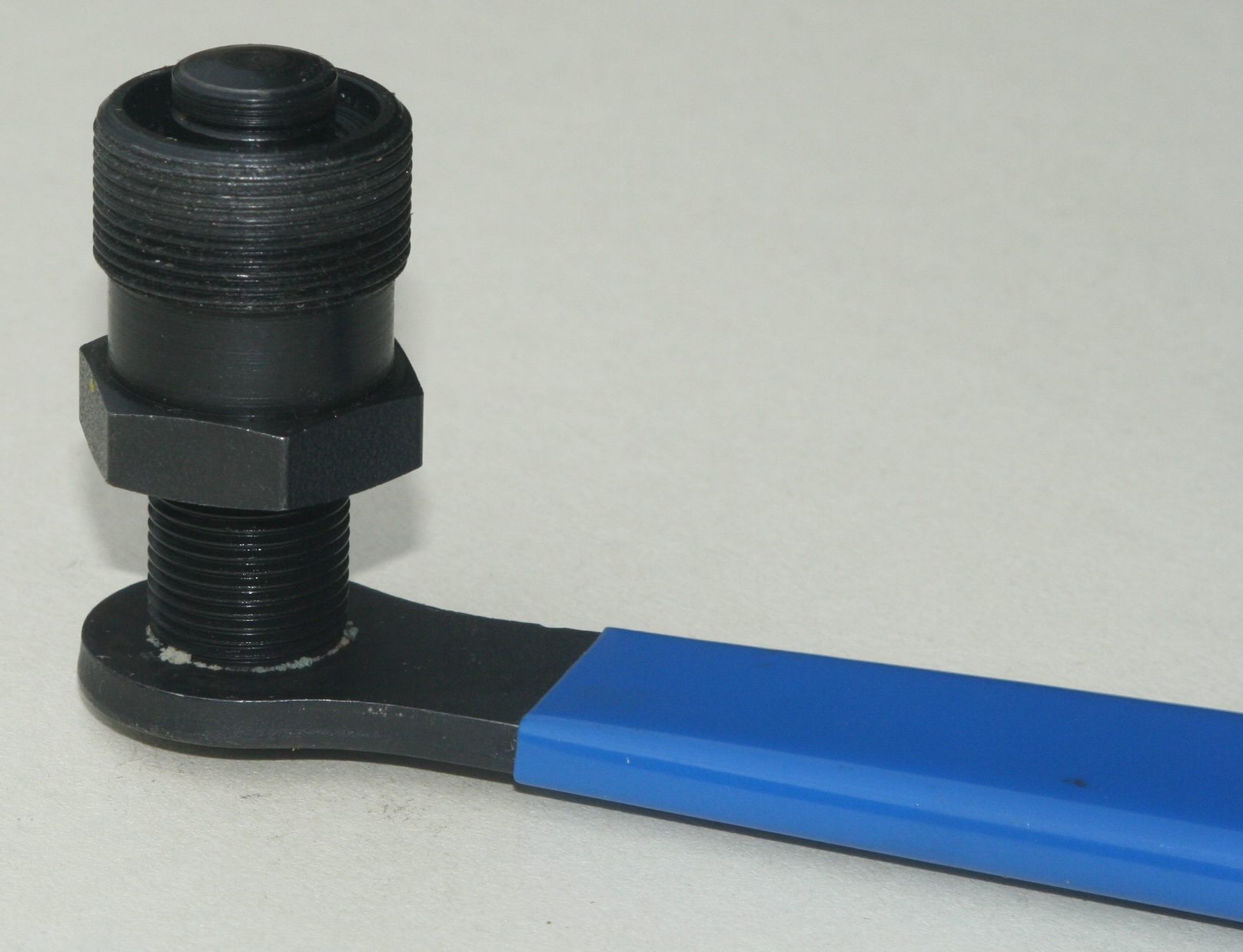
Crank extractor

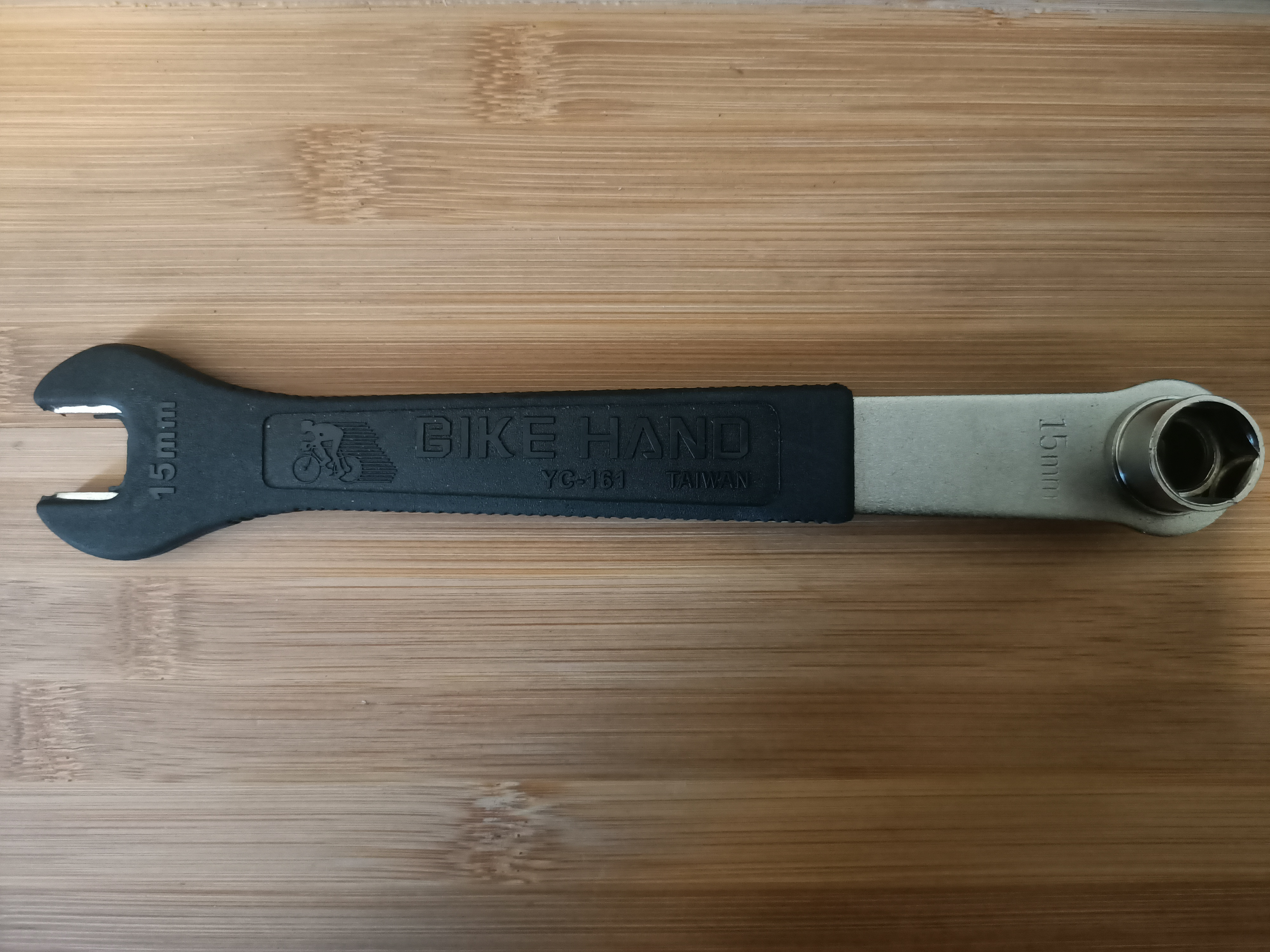
Multi-use bike tool combining a 15 mm pedal wrench with 14 mm and 15 mm socket wrenches

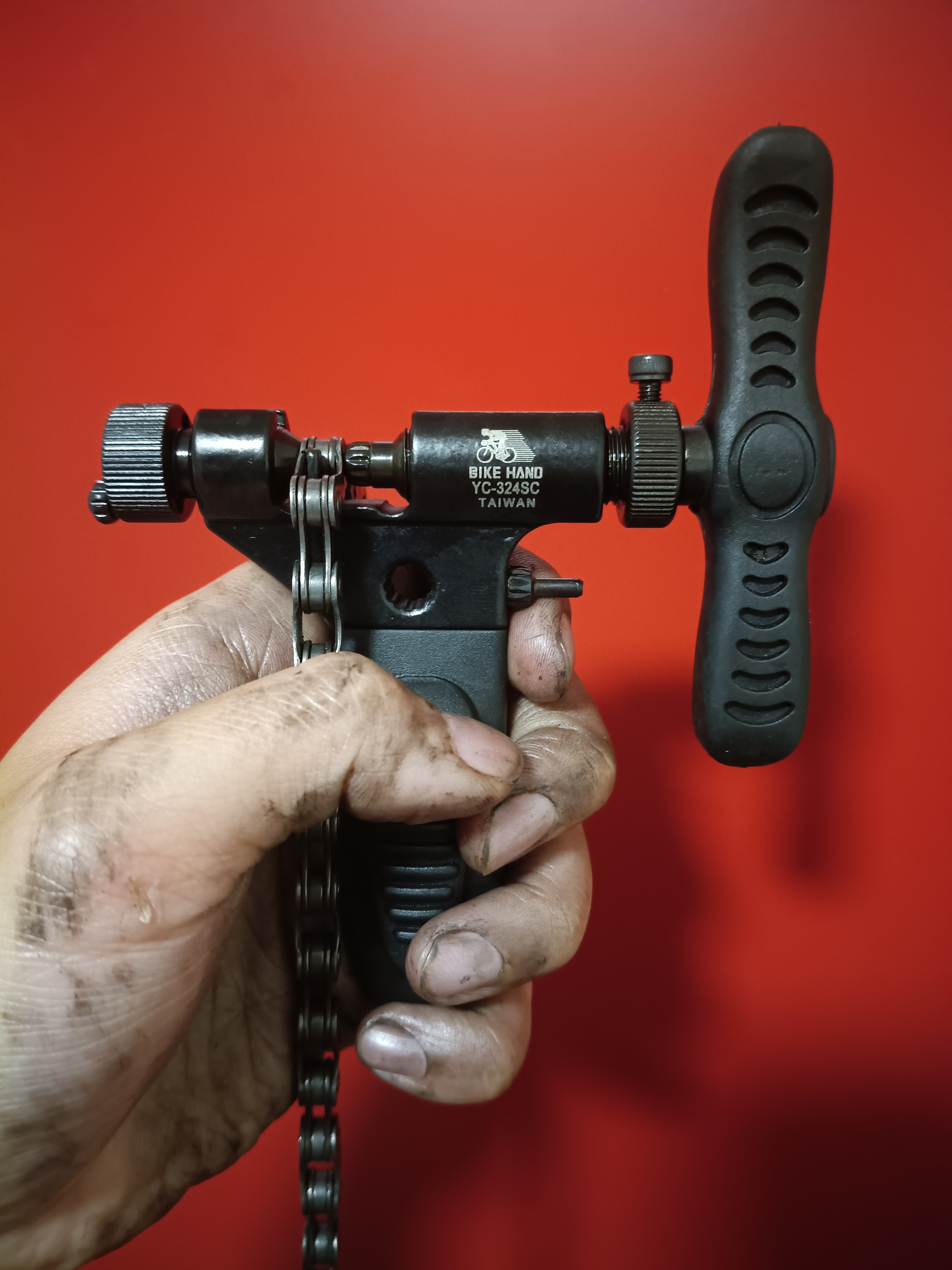
A chain tool in use to separate a bicycle chain for removal or resizing.

- A chain tool, also known as a chain splitter, is a hand tool used to "break" a bicycle chain by pushing out a chain pin (rivet). This allows the chain to be removed from a bicycle, resized by removing or adding links, repaired, or reassembled.
- A crank extractor is used to pull the crank off the bottom bracket spindle.
- A pedal wrench removes the pedals from the bicycle. It is also usually possible to use a common spanner of the correct size (typically 15 mm) for this, though it may be less convenient due to shorter leverage.
- A pin spanner is used on adjustable bottom brackets. Note that ISIS Drive bottom brackets need a separate tool (see below).
- Various bottom bracket wrenches for newer bottom bracket styles such as internally splined by ISIS, Shimano, FSA, and RaceFace; externally notched by Campagnolo Veloce, Xenon, Mirage, Daytona and Avanti; and externally mounted by Shimano.
- Bottom bracket taps and facing tools are tools used to tap or chase the threads in the bottom bracket shell and face the outside edges, respectively. A single tool will sometimes handle both jobs, and is usually suitable for light-duty bicycle shop use. A separate tap set and facing set is usually employed by frame builders where more robust tooling that is more frequently used is needed. Both tap sets and facing sets are intended for frame finishing work after welding and/or brazing, as the frame tubes tend to deform slightly after this process, and for cleaning out any weld splatter or paint from the bottom bracket threads. A bottom bracket tap set can be used to tap new threads in a blank bottom bracket shell (or for converting ISO threads to larger diameter Italian), but the process is slow and cumbersome and especially hard on most taps, particularly when tapping hard aluminum or titanium.
- A chain whip and lock-ring remover are used for changing derailleur cassettes.
- Various freewheel removers are used to unscrew freewheels from hubs.
- A derailleur alignment gauge is used to straighten rear derailleur hangers.

=== Stands ===
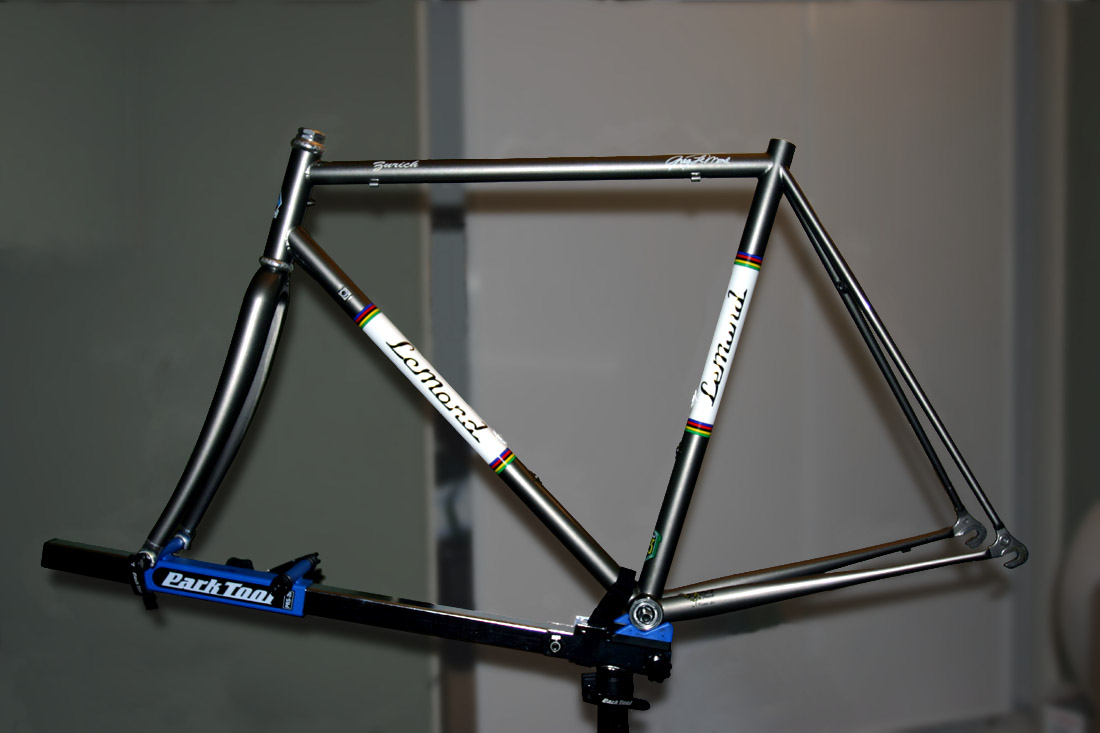
Work stand (painted black and blue) holding a bicycle frame by its fork dropouts and bottom bracket shell.

Various devices have been devised to hold a bike still to facilitate working on it, and they are usually called stands. Stands may clamp a part of the bike, such as the seatpost, seat tube, or top tube, or they may simply provide a surface on which a bike may rest with some security. Stands, especially those that clamp to a bike, may provide a means of repositioning a bike in order to conveniently locate the part being worked on. Stands may be either portable (light and collapsible) or fixed (heavy, usually attached to the floor, wall, or bench).

Care must be taken with clamping stands not to clamp a part of the bike that cannot withstand the pressure, such as the tubes of many aluminum or carbon fiber frames, and non-cylindrical carbon fiber seatposts. An auxiliary bracket may be used with clamping stands to keep the steering mechanism from rotating.

=== Storage rack ===
Bicycle storage refers to a method of storing bicycles indoors or outdoors to reduce space usage and protect bicycles. There are various ways to store bicycles, including using bicycle racks, hooks, vertical bike stands, bicycle storage cabinets, etc.

Bicycle racks are one of the most commonly used bicycle storage devices. They are usually made of metal or plastic and can support the weight of the bicycle while lifting it up to save space. Bicycle racks can be placed on the ground or on the wall, allowing the bicycle to be hung up and not take up floor space.

Hooks are also a common bicycle storage device. They are usually made of metal and can be fixed on the wall or ceiling. The benefit of using hooks is that the bicycle can be stored vertically, which saves more space. However, using hooks requires more effort to put the bicycle on and is not suitable for storing heavy bicycles.

Vertical bike stands are a type of bicycle storage device that can store multiple bicycles. They are usually made of metal and can be placed on the ground, often in a corner of a garage or shed. This storage method is more space-saving than bicycle racks and can store multiple bicycles.

Bicycle storage cabinets are an indoor storage solution for bicycles. They are usually made of wood, plastic or metal and can protect bicycles from weather and sun damage. They usually have locks to protect bicycles from theft and can reduce indoor bicycle space usage.

Bicycle storage can reduce the space occupied by bicycles while protecting them from weather and sun damage. Choosing the right bicycle storage method can make bicycles last longer and save home or commercial space.

== See also ==
- Howard C. Hawkins
- Lezyne
- Outline of cycling
- Park Tool
