= Bicycle Kitchen (Los Angeles) =

The Bicycle Kitchen/La Bicicocina is an educational non-profit bicycle workspace in the Los Angeles neighborhood of East Hollywood.

== History ==
The name "bicycle kitchen" is a version of the more common term "bike kitchen", a popular name among community bicycle organizations. However, the L.A. Bicycle Kitchen has played no small part in popularizing the name throughout the past two decades. The origins of Los Angeles' Bicycle Kitchen date back to 2002, when a tiny bicycle repair workshop was set up in an unused apartment in an intentional community known as the Los Angeles Eco-Village. A resident and local bicycle messenger cooked food and encouraged others to join him for evenings of bikes, pizza, and beer. Soon other kindred spirits joined the group, including Ben Guzman, Aaron Salinger, and Randy Metz. The bicycle kitchen became a community resource and a local hot spot for bicycle enthusiasts the following year.

By the winter of 2004, the small space could not accommodate the number of people attending, so the loosely organized group of volunteers decided to find a different space and become a collectively run non-profit organization.

In 2005, Ben Guzman signed the lease that brought the Bicycle Kitchen into the forefront of the public's eye by moving it from the confines of the Eco-Village storefront at Melrose and Heliotrope. The neighborhood that the Bicycle Kitchen moved into was in rapid transition and quickly became filled with like-minded supportive entrepreneurial young businesses, namely: Scoops (ice cream), Pure Luck (vegan food and beer), Vlad the Retailer (craft items, venue), and Orange 20 (boutique bicycle shop).

In 2010, after years of successive rent increases at their location in what was coming to be called "The Bicycle District" and fearing that the Bicycle Kitchen might get priced out of the neighborhood, it became clear that the bicycle Kitchen should purchase a building.

In May 2012, after a fundraising campaign, the Bicycle Kitchen moved into a larger space 1.4 miles away from their old neighborhood. Their new home is in a former bakery at 4429 Fountain Avenue.
