= Howard Hawkins (businessman) =

Howard Carl Hawkins (1932 – January 26, 2015) was an American businessman and bicycle tools maker, co-founder of Park Tool in Saint Paul, Minnesota. He is considered one of the pioneers in the bicycle industry. He died of a heart attack in Arizona on January 26, 2015.

== Early life and education ==
Hawkins was born to second generation Swedish immigrant parents in the Twin Cities. His father Carl died in 1940, and his mother Elsie raised him alongside his two sisters Hazel and Helen. In 1950, he graduated from Minnehaha Academy and joined the US Navy, followed by technical school at Dunwoody Institute, learning welding and blacksmithing.

== Career ==
In 1956, Hawkins purchased 'Hazel Park Radio and Bicycle' on White Bear Avenue and East 7th Street in the Hazel Park area of Saint Paul, Minnesota. He did so along with his boyhood friend and business partner Art Engstrom. They opened a small bicycle shop, repairing and selling Schwinn bicycles. They invented a swivelling bicycle repair stand that held a bike off the ground. In 1963, after introducing the stand to the Schwinn Bicycle Company and building stands for Schwinn dealerships, they started a bicycle tools business they named Park Tool. They expanded to wheel truing stands, a variety of other tools and eventually tools for consumer cyclists. In 1967, they moved their store to White Bear Avenue and Highway 36, which grew to become 'Park Schwinn', a national top-10 Schwinn Bicycle Company dealership, eventually with three locations. In 1981, they sold all stores to concentrate on the bicycle tool business they had been running alongside the retail stores. The tool company became the world's largest supplier of bicycle tools, Park Tool Company, now in Oakdale, Minnesota.

In 2000, in advance of retirement in 2003, Hawkins transferred the business to his son Eric. One of Eric's three sisters also works for the company.

== Legacy ==
Bicycling Magazine wrote "The co-founder of Park Tool has never been a widely recognized figure, even in cycling circles. But his death last week reminded us of the impact his life had on the lives of cyclists and mechanics the world over". As of February 2015 Park Tool sold nearly 300 different tools to bike repair shops in America, Europe and Asia, "identifiable by their [handle in a] trademarked shade of blue: Pantone 2935".

== Private life ==
In 1958, Hawkins married Donna, with whom he had 4 children, Suanne Banfield, Eric Hawkins, Carole Lehn and Sara Carlson, and to whom he was married to for 57 years. In 2003, Hawkins retired to his home in Mahtomedi, Minnesota "to ride his bike, work in his woodshop and to watch his 13 grandchildren grow up". He took up auto repair as a hobby and "never stopped riding his bike, a 1960 Schwinn Paramount". His son said, he "had been slowing down a bit, but still enjoyed building the company’s booths for Eurobike and Interbike". In the winters the couple lived in Scottsdale, Arizona. On January 26, 2015, he died of complications related to a heart attack a few days after coronary stent surgery in Scottsdale. He is buried at Fort Snelling National Cemetery.
