= Bicycle library =

Lending facility

The Bicycle Library at the 20th anniversary of Critical Mass in London.

A bicycle library is a facility for lending bicycles and cycling accessories to riders for trial or use.

== Examples ==
In London, a mobile bicycle library called The Bicycle Library has been created in a double-decker bus by fashion designer Karta Healy who first used buses as exhibition space for London Fashion Week. The Bicycle Library toured Beijing during Beijing Design Week with fashionable bicycles by Gucci and Chanel as these brands specially appeal to Chinese tastes.

In San Francisco, the Critical Mass movement has run the "Bat Cave Bicycle Library", a library of parts and old bicycles which are made available to enthusiasts.

Since 2011 Cykelbiblioteket (lit. 'The Bicycle Library') has been open for local citizens of Copenhagen. The library is run by the local bicycle organization Bicycle Innovation Lab and in cooperation with the local agenda 21 organization Miljøpunkt Amager. The library provides a range of bicycles that provide a viable alternative to the car (electric bikes, cargo bikes, folding bikes and racers). Borrowing bicycles from Cykelbiblioteket is only possible through membership. Membership can be obtained through payment or volunteering. Bicycle Innovation Lab also sell bikes from over 40 local and international bicycle suppliers. They also provide a service to set up different types of bicycle libraries for both public and private organizations.

== See also ==
- Bicycle rental
- Bicycle cooperative
- Bicycle sharing system
- List of bicycle sharing systems
