= Royal Ontario Museum Bat Cave =

Gallery at the Royal Ontario Museum

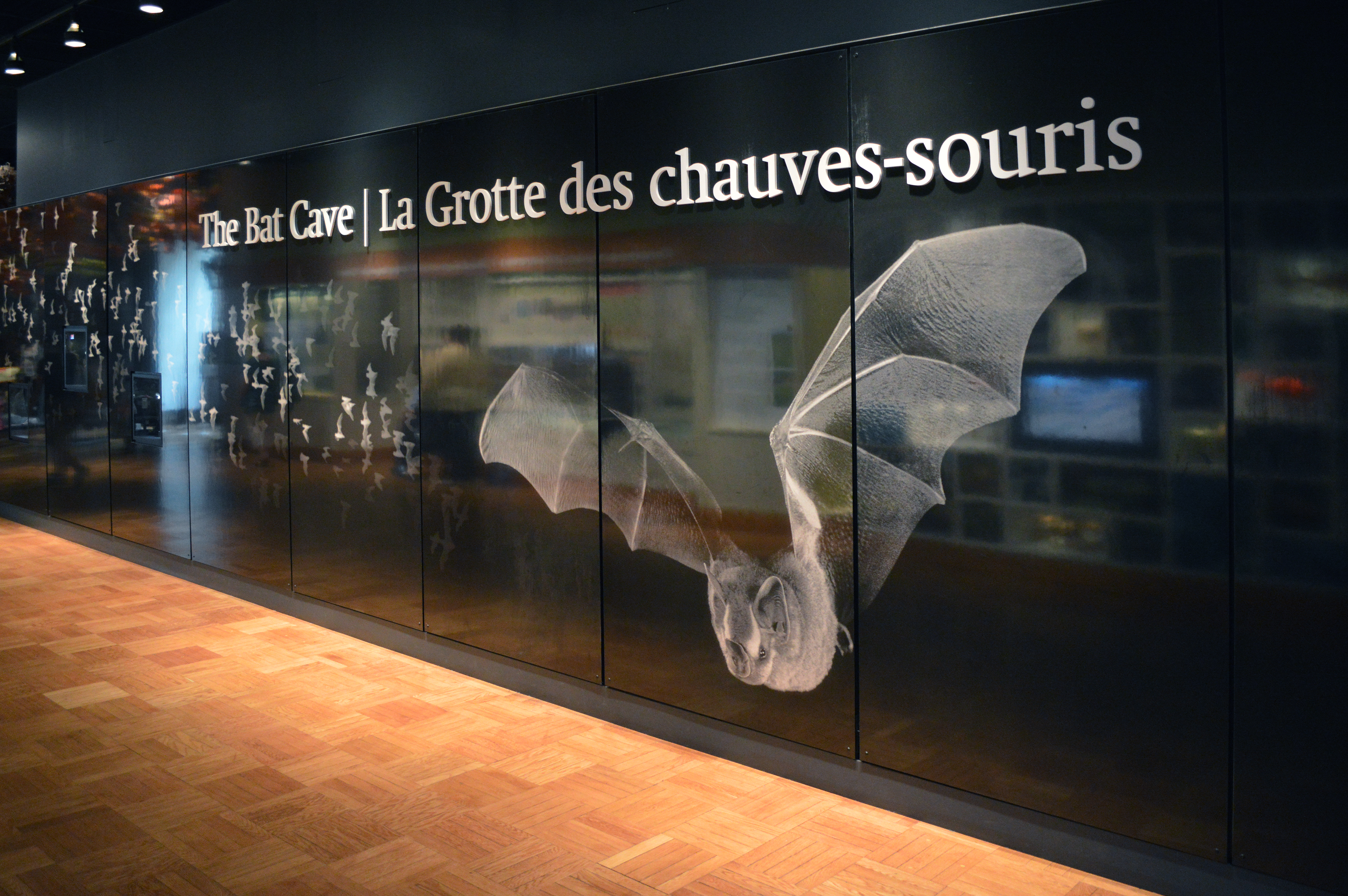
The entrance to the Royal Ontario Museum Bat Cave on the second level

The Royal Ontario Museum Bat Cave (French: La Grotte des chauves-souris) is a gallery at the Royal Ontario Museum that presents wax sculptures of bats in their simulated natural habitat. Consisting of twenty species of bats, among a variety of invertebrates, the gallery allows visitors to learn about the behaviour and biology of bats, through engaging in various educational panels, videos and models.

It is currently located on the second level, of the Philosopher's Walk Wing in the museums Heritage Building.

== History ==
The bat cave was originally built in the 1980s as a replica of the 3-kilometre (1.9 mi) St. Clair Cave in Jamaica. In the early 2000s however, the Royal Ontario Museum received a grant to renovate the cave among two new Roman and Byzantine Galleries. Thus updated sound effects, dim lighting, and rock models were incorporated to make the cave appear more realistic. Today, the exhibit stands at 1,700 square feet (160 m^{2}). With over 300 new wax models of bats and bugs that are even more authentic than before, visitors now also have an opportunity to see bald pink baby bats, amidst an eerie dark backdrop that has come to be known as the nursery cave.

== Bat Cave experience areas ==
=== Explore the World of Bats ===
Before guests enter the mouth of the Bat Cave, there is a series of panels that address various common questions and curiosities concerning bats and their natural habitat. Guests learn about how bats navigate in the dark, how they see, how they travel through the dark and if they are similar to humans. In addition, guests learn about their current patterns of behaviour and eating habits, among many other things presented in formats on the wall.

At the Cave Mouth, there are a variety of other descriptions that historicize how the cave was modelled after the St. Clair Cave in Jamaica. The panel presents a detailed account of what the cave looks, sounds and smells like. It informs the visitors of the kinds of insects and bats they would see if they were to visit the cave.

There is also a Bat Cave Field Guide that helps visitors identify the six species of bats they may encounter in the cave.

=== Inside the Bat Cave ===
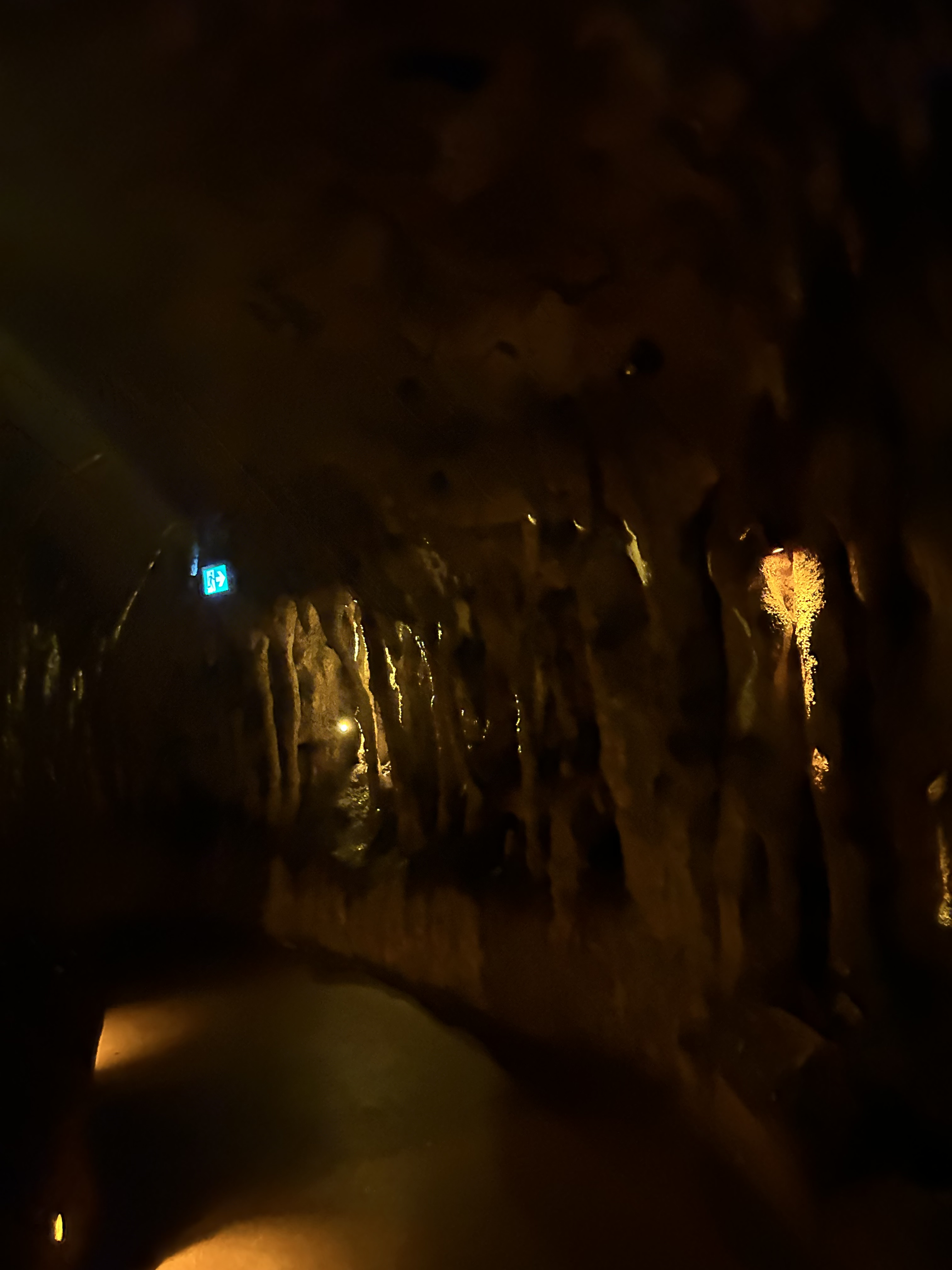
Interior of the Bat Cave

Within the bat cave lies a variety of bats, cockroaches and other invertebrates that simulate a realistic portrayal of the St. Clair Cave in Jamaica.

There are currently the following areas in the cave:

- Fruit Bat Roosting Area
- The Grooming Area
- The Cavern: a natural theatre within the Bat Cave where visitors can watch an audio-visual presentation that elaborates on the specifics of the cave.
- The Bat Nursery
- The Bat Exodus

== Events at the Royal Ontario Museum ==
- Bat Month: In March 2010, the Royal Ontario Museum offered a variety of live bat demonstrations, costumes, crafts and other educational activities to celebrate the reopening of the Bat Cave Exhibit. Presenters like Bill “Bat Boy” Scully, African Lion Safari, and Dr. Paul Faure of the McMaster Bat Lab all presented a variety of interactive and informational experiences.
- Food Studio Café: In partnership with the Food Studio Café, the Royal Ontario Museum offered a variety of bat-themed meals such as “bat wings chicken wing special” to promote the new exhibit.
- Youth Patron’s Circles (YPC) also hosted their fifth annual fundraiser PROM v Noir at the exhibit in March 2010.
