= Bat Cave (Saint Lucia) =

Cave in Saint Lucia

Coordinates: 13°47′55″N 61°01′10″W

Bat Cave is a small cave in the Caribbean Island of St. Lucia on the Western Coast.

The cave is a local landmark for boats organising snorkel trips for tourists.

Despite its name, the cave is not believed to contain a large bat population.
