= Bicycle cooperative =

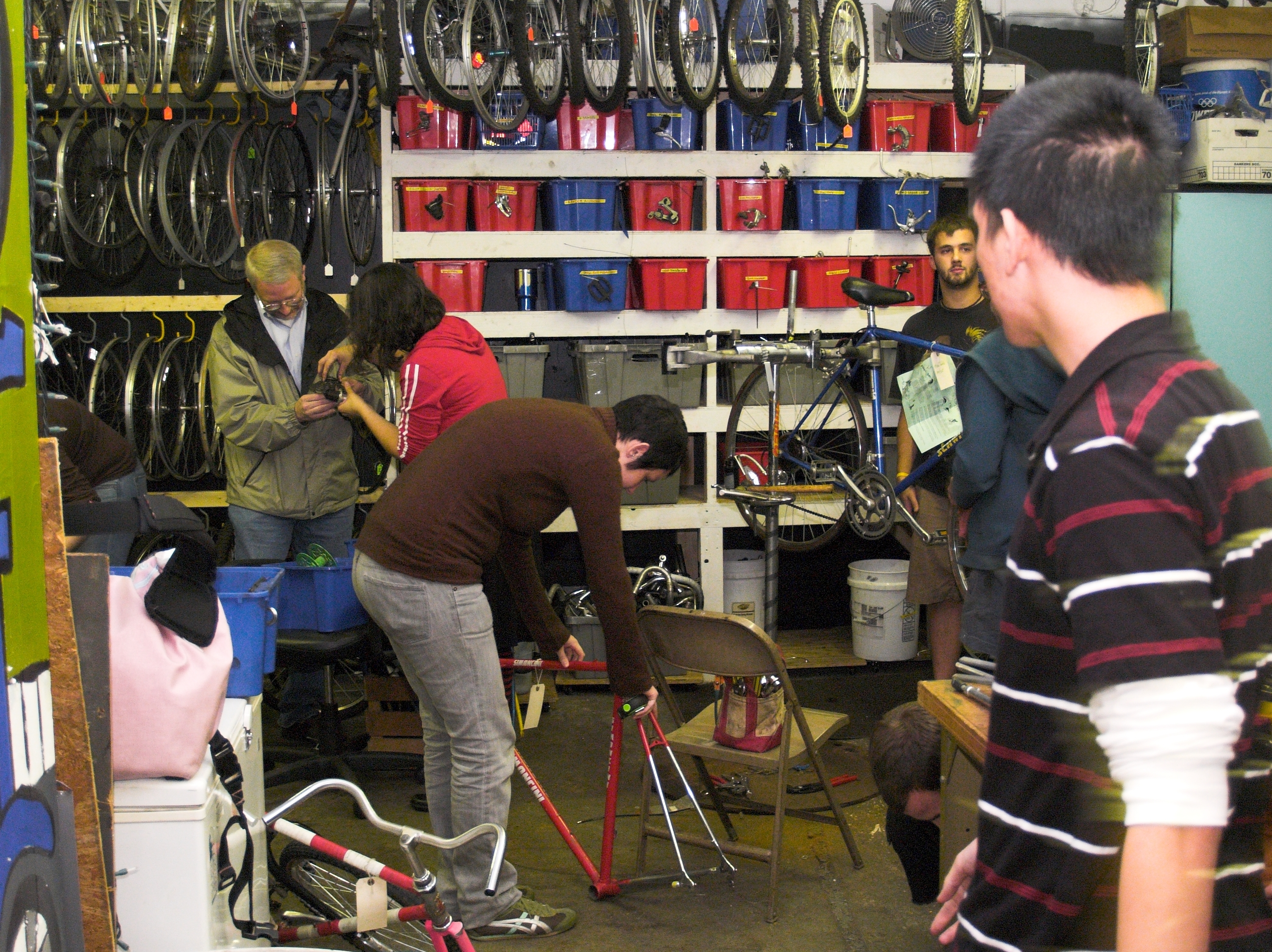
Assisted-service bicycle repair at the Sopo Bicycle Cooperative in Atlanta, Georgia

A bicycle cooperative ("bike co-op") refers to a cooperative that service bicycles and/or provide tools, training, equipment or space for the maintenance of bicycles or that transport goods or services with bicycles. Many bike co-ops have taken the form of community bike shops or cooperatives organized to give the local bike shop national scale and buying power with some operating as delivery cooperatives.

In terms of governance structure, bike co-ops can take the many forms of the cooperative model. For example, bicycle co-ops owned by the cyclists that use their services (consumers' co-operative), co-ops composed of businesses to achieve economies of scale (retailers' cooperative), or co-ops owned and managed by those who work at the business (worker cooperative).

== Bike cooperatives owned by consumers ==
As a consumers' co-operative, community bike cooperatives are organized and owned by the cyclists who use them. Members often receive exclusive access and benefits to service and sales.

=== Shop time ===
Shop time is considered to be the use of the bike co-op's space and tools. Some bike co-ops charge users a fee per hour, for example Hub City Cycles (Nanaimo, CA) charges members $20 an hour. Needing hands-on assistance can come with an extra cost or the requirement to become a member.

Many of these co-ops also use a pay what you can model and/or pay it forward model, for example Bike Pirates (Toronto, CA) and Squeaky Wheel Bike Co-op (London, CA).

=== Parts ===
The cost of new or used parts is usually paid in addition to shop time. Some bike shops stock new items such as brake pads, inner tubes, cables and housing, and bearings, for example.

Parts may be sourced from public donations. Children's bikes could be donated when they are outgrown, and abandoned bikes are sometimes obtained through partnerships with police departments (evidence control), street cleaning firms, or from large institutions such as schools and universities. Donated bikes that need repairs can be fixed by the co-op and resold for revenue, for example as done at CoMo Bike Co-op.

== Bike cooperatives owned by retailers ==
When a bicycle cooperative takes the form of a retailer cooperative, multiple businesses within the industry come together to achieve economies of scale to compete with big-box brands, department stores and direct-to-consumer bike sales.

In order to lower costs, retailers' cooperatives establish central buying locations, providing them with the opportunity to purchase in bulk. Retailers' cooperatives also engage in group advertising and promotion, uniform stock merchandising, and private branding.

A retailers' cooperative for American independent bicycle dealers was established in 2003 called The Bike Cooperative, which now has 300+ members across the country. Some retailers' cooperatives such as REI Co-op (who also offer bike shop services to members) and E.Leclerc sell bikes as well, however they wouldn’t be called a bike cooperative owned by retailers.

== Bike cooperatives owned by workers ==
Bike cooperatives can be worker-owned in a bike shop that offers servicing of bicycling and/or selling whole bicycles, parts, tools, or accessories. Coop Roue-Libre in Quebec City is a unique example of a non-profit solidarity cooperative and multi-stakeholder cooperative. They not only offer the typical bike shop services, including training and workshops, but they are also involved in advocacy.

Bike cooperatives can also be worker-owned in courier, messenger, or delivery services. In these co-ops, worker-owners are riding specialized bicycles in order to bring documents, parcels or even catering orders between people and businesses within a localized area. Delivery co-operatives are being researched and identified as a viable an alternative model to corporate-driven platforms such as Uber to provide more favourable workplace environments.

A rare example of a worker-owned bicycle tire producer cooperative is Trademh, which operated in Mexico between 1995 and 2002.

== Bike cooperatives and digital transformation ==
CoopCycle is a federation for bike delivery or messenger cooperatives that is an example of technological innovation and digital transformation within the bike co-operative industry. Their approach is an example of democratizing both work and technology.

== History ==
Bicycle co-ops have existed for decades. Cooperative bicycle clubs in the 1930-40s played an important role in the economic development of eastern Nigeria, demonstrating both the social and economic benefits of the model.

Fahrrad.Selbsthilfe.Werkstatt dates back to 1983 in Vienna, Austria. Edinburgh Bicycle Co-operative is the longest-standing registered bike cooperative worldwide and one of the oldest worker cooperatives in Scotland, established in 1977. Another example is “P'tit vélo dans la tête" founded in Grenoble, France, in 1994.

Bike co-ops started to arise in Canada and the United States of America around the year 2000, for instance AMS Bike Co-op in 1998 and San Francisco's ‘The Bike Kitchen’ in 2003.

Bike co-ops can be found worldwide. The Bike Collective Network includes a regionally sorted list of community bicycle organizations, with many of them identified as cooperatives. Another reference for looking for bike co-operatives around the world can be found by searching the International Co-operative Alliance’s “.coop world map”.

== List of active bike co-operatives worldwide ==
=== Australia ===
- BikeWise Australia Co-operative Limited (Sydney, NSW)
- Cycle Re-cycle (Sydney, NSW)
- Bicycle Garden (Sydney, NSW)
- Hotline Couriers Co-op (Sydney, NSW)

=== Canada ===
- Hub City Cycles Community Co-operative (Nanaimo, BC)
- AMS Bike Co-op – The Bike Kitchen (Vancouver, BC)
- Shift Delivery Co-op (Vancouver, BC)
- FreeHub Co-operative (Victoria, BC)
- FreeRiders E-Bike Co-operative (Victoria, BC)
- Coop Vélo-Cité (Winnipeg, MB)
- Fietser Bikeshare Cooperative (Winnipeg, MB)
- La Bikery Co-operative Ltd. (Moncton, NB)
- New Hope Bike Co-op (Hamilton, ON)
- Squeaky Wheel Bike Co-op (London, ON)
- Veloz Courier (Ottawa, ON)
- Bike Pirates Co-op (Toronto, ON)
- Send It Courier (Toronto, ON)
- Urbane Cyclist (Toronto, ON)
- Bike Friendly Communities Co-operative Limited (Charlottetown, PE)
- Lurlu Coop (Montréal, QC)
- Cycle 7 Bike Cooperative (Montréal, QC)
- Chasseurs Courrier (Montreal, QC)
- Coop roue libre (Quebec City, QC)
- Bridge City Bicycle Co-op (Saskatoon, SK)

=== France ===
- uN p'Tit véLo dAnS La Tête (Grenoble)

=== Philippines ===
- Malay Motorbike Service Cooperative (Malay, Aklan)

=== United States of America ===
- Big Beach Bicycle Cooperative (Seward, AK)
- Huntsville Urban Bike Share Coop - HUBS Coop (Huntsville, AL)
- Recycles Bike Co-op (Little Rock, AR)
- Box Dog Bikes Co-op (San Francisco, CA)
- Cricket Courier (San Francisco, CA)
- Fort Collins Bike Coop (Fort Collins, CO)
- Bradley Street Bicycle Co-op (New Haven, CT)
- St. Petersburg Bike Co-op (St. Petersburg, FL)
- Tampa Bay Bicycle Co-op (Tampa, FL)
- Lake Worth Bike Coop (West Palm Beach, FL)
- Sopo Bike Coop (Atlanta, GA)
- Savannah Bike Coop (Savannah, GA)
- WBRP Bike Co-op (Bloomington, IL)
- Bike Peoria Coop (Peoria, IL)
- Columbus Bicycle Cooperative (Columbus, IN)
- West Lafayette Bike Cooporative (West Lafayette, IN)
- Lawrence Unchained Bicycle Co-op (Lawrence, KS)
- CommonWheels Bicycle Co-Op (Allston, MA)
- Mount Rainier Bicycle Cooperative (Mount Rainier, MD)
- East Quad Bike Co-op (Ann Arbor, MI)
- Golden Gate Bike Co-op (Detroit, MI)
- Lansing Bike Coop (Lansing, MI)
- Mount Pleasant Bike Cooperative (Mount Pleasant, MI)
- Broke Spoke Bike Coop (Traverse City, MI)
- Kirksville Bike Co-op (Kirksville, MO)
- CoMo Bike Co-op (Columbia, MO)
- Durham Bike Co-op (Durham, NC)
- Cheshire County Bicycle Collective / Keene Bicycle Co-op (Keene, NH)
- The Bike Co-operative (Manchester, NH)
- New York Mechanical Gardens Bike Coop (Brooklyn, NY)
- Brookhaven Bicycle Co-op (Manorville, NY)
- Time's Up! Bike Co-op (New York City, NY)
- Brookhaven Bicycle Co-op (St. James, NY)
- Athens Bicycle Co-operative (Athens, OH)
- Mobo Bicycle Co-op (Cincinnati, OH)
- Ohio City Bicycle Co-op (Cleveland, OH)
- Third Hand Bicycle Cooperative (Columbus, OH)
- Oberlin Bike Co-op (Oberlin, OH)
- Toledo City Bicycle Co-op (Toledo, OH)
- CityBikes (Portland, OR)
- Bethlehem Bicycle Cooperative is a project of Car Free CAT-Coalition for Appropriate Transportation (Bethlehem, PA)
- Keystone Bicycle Co-op (Philadelphia, PA)
- Pin Up Posters Courier Collective (Pittsburgh, PA)
- Holy City Bike Co-op (Charleston, SC)
- Blackbird Bicycle Co-op (Columbia, SC)
- Spearfish Bicycle Cooperative (Spearfish, SD)
- White Oak Bicycle Coop (Red Bank, TN)
- San Antonio Bicycle Co-op (San Antonio, TX)
- UVM Bike Coop (Burlington, VT)
- Vélocity Bicycle Cooperative (Alexandria, VA)
- Bicycle Co-Op of Williamsburg (Williamsburg, VA)
- Community Bike Cooperative (Bellingham, WA)
- Seattle Messenger Co-operative (Seattle, WA)
- The Bicycle Tree (Santa Ana, CA)

=== United Kingdom ===
- Bristol Bike Project (Bristol, England)
- Broken Spoke Bike Co-op (Oxford, England)
- Birmingham Bike Foundry (Stirchley, Birmingham, England)
- Chorlton Bike Deliveries Cooperative (Manchester, England)
- Leeds Bike Mill (Leeds, England)
- Platt Fields Bike Hub Ltd. (Manchester, England)
- Sussex Cycling - The Bike Shack (Falmer, England)
- Feral Express (Sheffield, England)
- Edinburgh Bike Co-operative (Edinburgh, Scotland)
- Roam Scotland Bikepacking Society (Edinburgh, Scotland)

=== Jersey (British Crown Dependency) ===
- Coop Bikes

== See also ==
- Bicycle § Maintenance and repair: discusses self-service, full-service, and roadside assistance
- Bicycle library: a facility for lending bicycles and accessories to riders for trial or use
- Cycling
- Local bike shop
- Makerspace
- Repair café
- Tool library
