= Cone wrench =

Tool used in bicycle assembly and maintenance

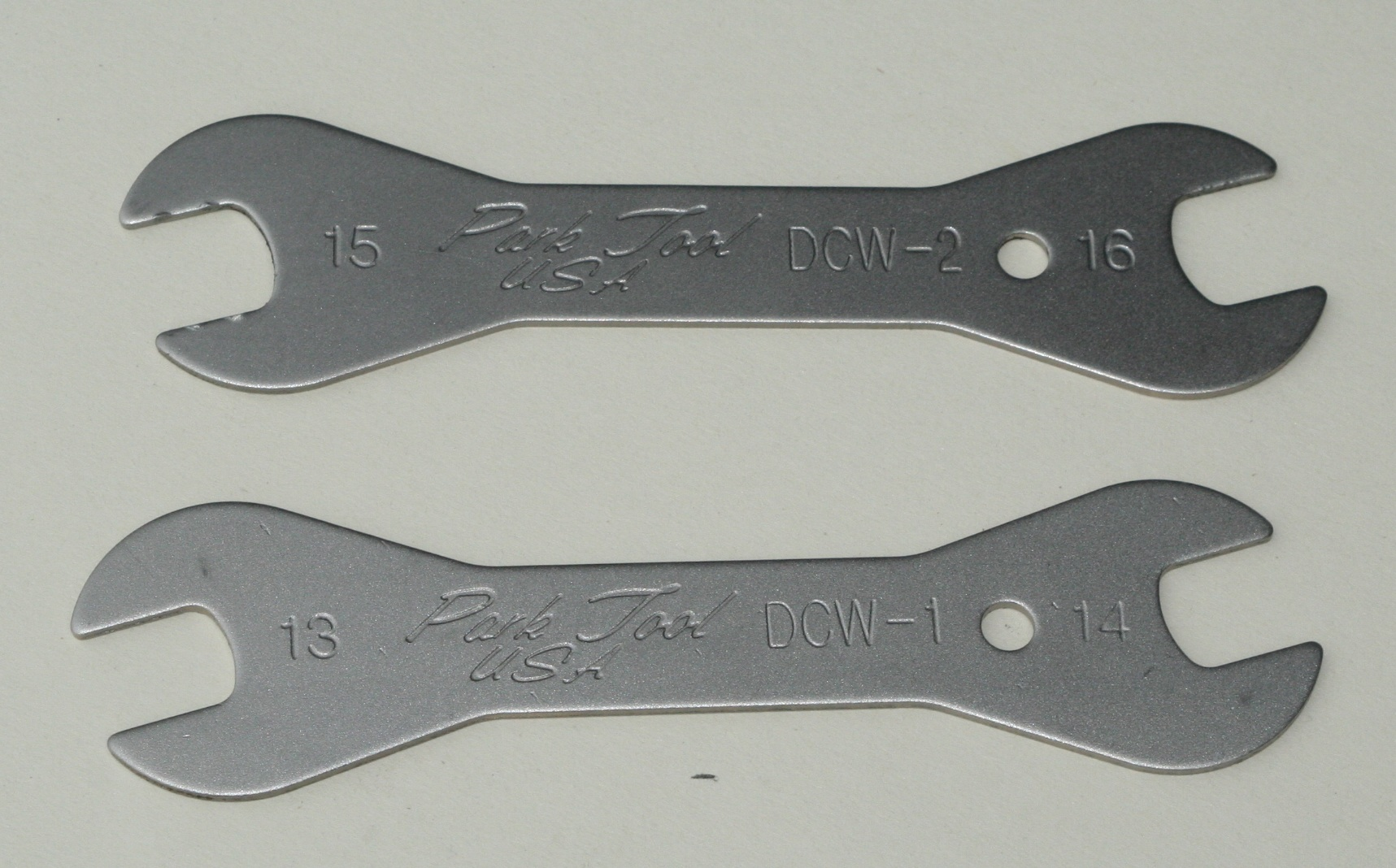
Double-ended cone wrenches, 13–16mm

A cone wrench or cone spanner is a tool used in bicycle assembly and maintenance to adjust the cones of cup and cone bearings. Cone wrenches are thinner and lighter than most other open ended wrenches that are used to work on bicycles. They should be used only for making adjustments to cones or for other low torque applications such as centering brakes. Using a cone wrench in high torque applications such as loosening outer axle nuts may easily damage the wrench. Cone wrenches are typically about 2 mm thick, compared to approximately 7 mm for a standard open-ended wrench.

Cone wrenches are commonly sized between 13mm and 28mm. The sizes most commonly used today are 13, 14, 15, 16 and 17mm. Most sizes 19mm and above are used for specialty applications such as BMX and internally geared hubs.
