= Bicycle mechanic =

Profession that repairs bicycles

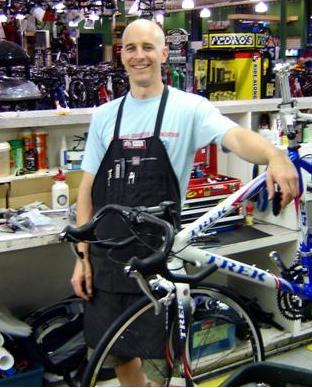
A bicycle mechanic at a local bike shop.

A bicycle mechanic or bike mechanic is a mechanic who can perform a wide range of repairs on bicycles.

== Classification and wages ==
The New York State Department of Labor describes bicycle repair as a "realistic" occupation, meaning an occupation that would be enjoyed by somebody who likes "practical, hands-on problems," dealing with "real-world materials like wood, tools, and machinery," and one that "does not involve a lot of paperwork or working closely with others." They classify it as a job that "usually requires a high school diploma and may require some vocational training or job-related course work. In some cases, an associate's or bachelor's degree could be needed. Employees in these occupations need anywhere from a few months to one year of working with experienced employees." They indicate an annual wage in the neighborhood of $25,000, but can earn up to a little more than $40,000. "In 2002, employment for bicycle repairers in New York was 360."

== Skills and training ==
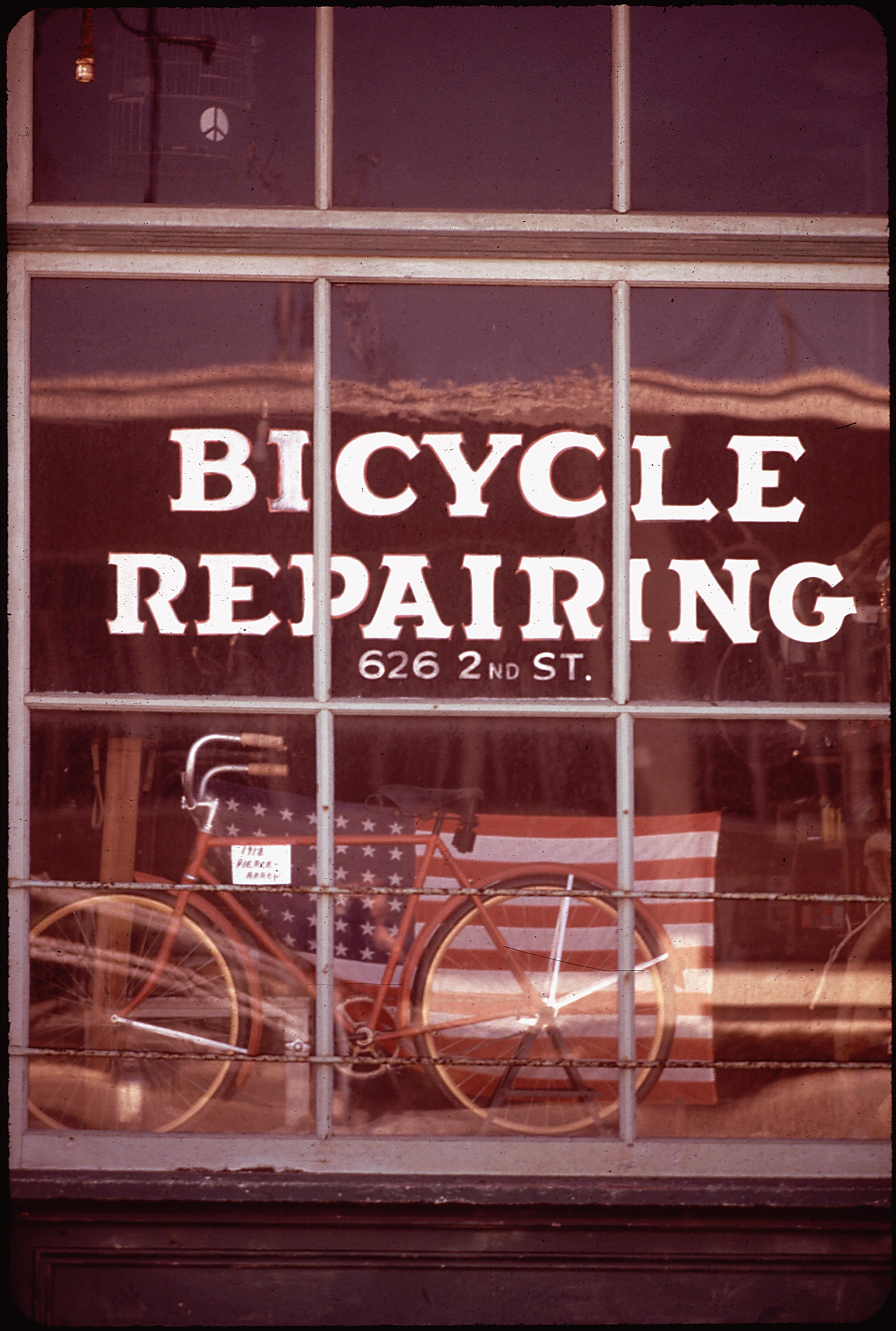
Repair shop in California, 1972

The skills involved in maintaining bicycles of any kind take years to build, and are usually honed on the job in the service department of bike shops.

In the US, there are few established locations where training can be had. The oldest school for bicycle mechanics, opened in 1981, is United Bicycle Institute in Ashland, Oregon, where aspiring mechanics can take multiple courses in varied subjects. Appalachian Bicycle Institute in Asheville, North Carolina has been offering classes since 2010. For high school graduates, community colleges in Bentonville Arkansas and Minneapolis, Minnesota offer training as an accredited two-semester program through the Bicycle Industry Employers Association. Barnett Bicycle Institute existed from 1986 until it was closed in 2023, following two changes in ownership.
