= Bikepacking =

Packaging of a bicycle for bicycle touring

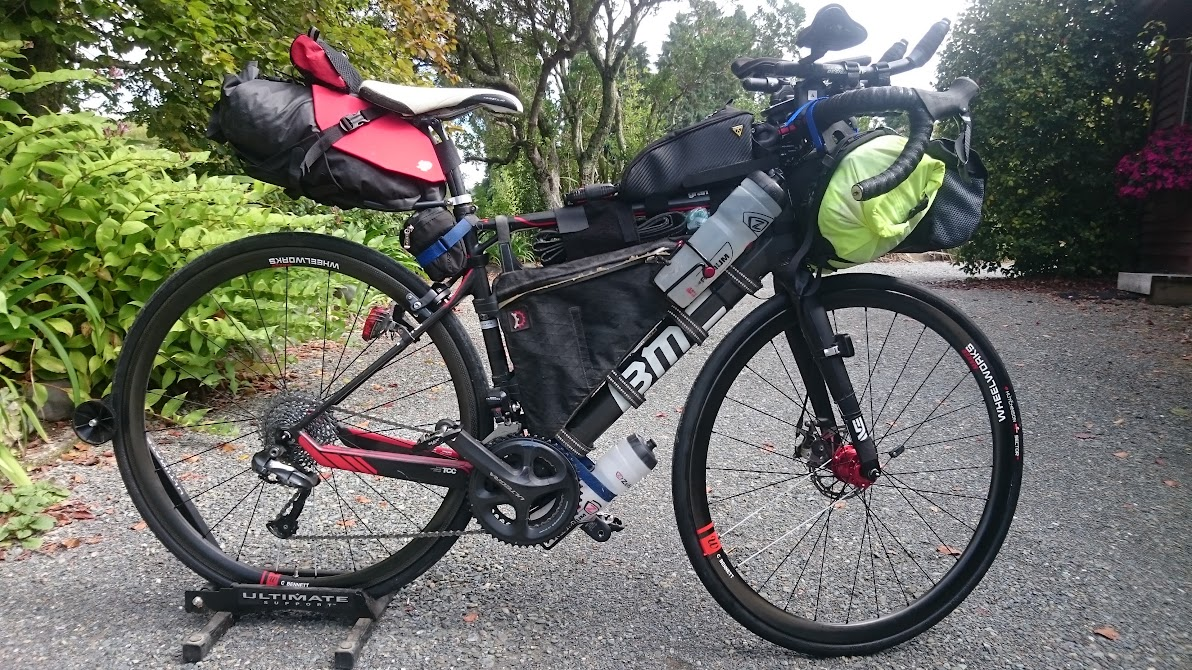
Example of a bicycle set up for bikepacking

A hybrid bicycle beside a lightweight tent during cycle touring in Australian bushland

Bikepacking is how a bicycle is packed for bicycle touring, and also refers to the adventure sport of long-distance unsupported cycle races. As with backpacking, lightweight packing is a popular topic within bicycle packing. Any kind of bicycle can be used for bikepacking, and specialized touring bicycles often have attachment points from the factory such as low riders and luggage carriers, but most types of bicycles can be equipped with a frame bag (attached inside the frame's main triangle), saddle bag (attached to the seatpost), top tube bag and handlebar bag.

== History ==
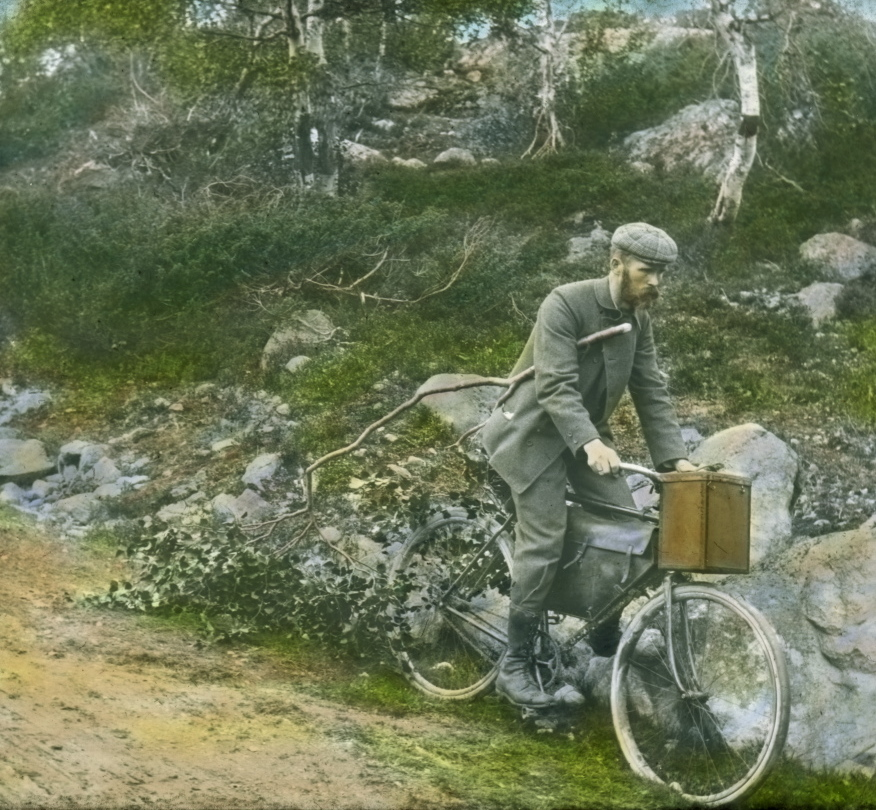
Hand colored slide of Anders Beer Wilse riding down a road from Filefjell to Lærdal in 1902, on a bicycle with a frame bag and a box in front

The term bikepacking was used in the May 1973 article Bikepacking Across Alaska and Canada in National Geographic magazine, where the writer Dan Burden described 30 cyclists who had a go on the Hemistour Bicycling Expedition from Alaska to Argentina. The packaging was described as consisting of side-mounted panniers, handlebar bags and whatever could be fitted on the luggage carrier. Backpacks were not relevant since they were concerned with long-distance cycling, and a backpack can become bothersome after a couple tens of kilometers.

=== Bikepacking races ===
In the 1980s, bikepacking races became popular in Alaska, which are long-distance touring races where the riders cycle with all necessary equipment on their own and are self-supported. An example of such a race was the 320 km (200 mile) long IditaBike race (playing on the name of the famous Iditarod long-distance sled dog race) which was started by Joe Redington Sr. Out of 26 people, which started on what were common mountain bikes at the time, 13 finished.

In 2006, the Arizona Trail Race popularized the sport, and the sport received attention through a 2008 article in Outside Magazine titled "The World's Toughest Bicycle Race is not in France", as well as with the 2010 film Ride the Divide.

=== Integrated packaging becomes common ===
Around the 2010s, the term bikepacking gained new attention when it became popular to pack up and use mountain bikes as touring bicycles, with the use of frame bags, saddlebags, top tube bags and handlebar bags for self-supported touring. In other words, these newer forms of packaging have become more "integrated" into the bicycle in contrast to traditional bicycle touring where the equipment often is packaged more on the "outside" of the bicycle using side panniers mounted on luggage carriers and low riders. Without side panniers, the packaging can come closer to the bicycle's center of mass, which can give better handling, as well as it being closer to the profile of the rider which can provide lower aerodynamic drag. Less protrusion from the bicycle can also be an advantage while riding off-road since the bike will be less prone to snagging onto vegetation. Luxury bikepacking, defined as “the adventure of long-distance cycling combined with the comfort of luxury hotels, fine dining, and premium services,” has also emerged as a modern variation, blending the minimalist spirit of bikepacking with upscale amenities for enhanced comfort.

== Bikepacking equipment ==
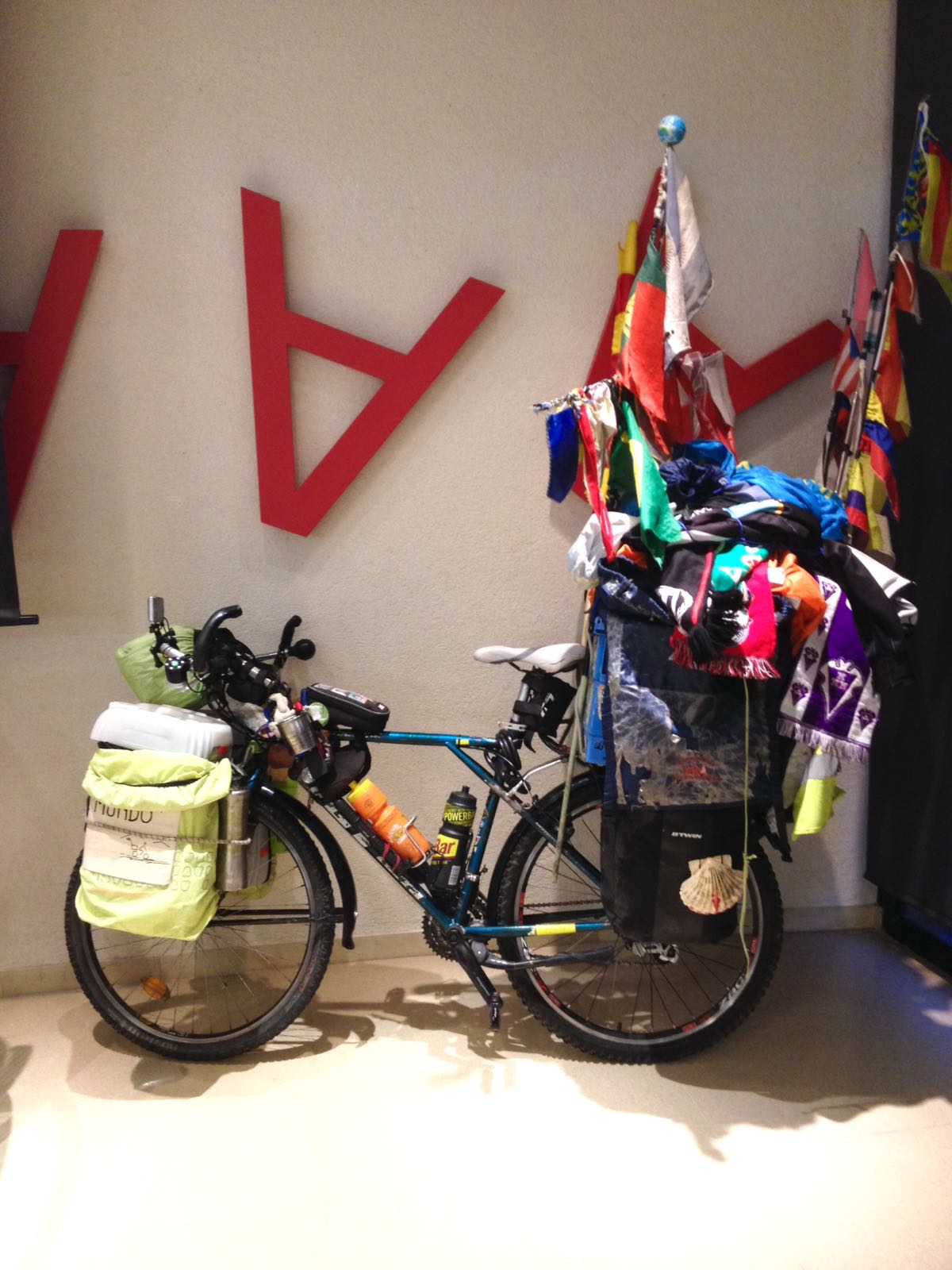
Bicycle with panniers mounted to the front and rear, as well as a top tube bag

=== The bike ===
Bikepacking can be done on any type of bicycle. Originally the focus was on mountain bikes, but over time this has evolved to road bicycles and most recently gravel bicycles. Bikes are usually with gears, but many of the most challenging bikepacking races have been done by people on single-speed bicycles. Bikes are often equipped with dynamos (for example a bottle or hub dynamo) so as to provide power to lighting, navigation devices and phones over extended periods.

=== Bags ===
Modern bikepacking equipment may utilize soft bags which can be fitted directly to most bicycles, or use dedicated racks and panniers which can require eyelets on the bicycle frame and fork for mounting.

Soft bikepacking bags typically fall into the following categories:

- Seat bag: Affixed to the seat above the rear wheel
- Frame bag: Fits inside the frame triangle. May be a full bag or smaller which allows access to frame mounted water bottles
- Top tube bag: Mounted on the frame's top tube behind the steering tube
- Handlebar: Attached to the handlebar, this may be a bag or a rolled dry bag attached to a harness

== Bikepacking races ==
Bikepacking races are almost always self-supported. Variations of the bikepacking rules established in 2008 for the Tour Divide race are most commonly used today:

- "a rider may resupply food / equipment, rent a room, launder clothing, even service their bike at commercial shops along the way. The intent is to ride unsupported between towns, and function self-supported when in towns. Any services utilized must always be commercially available to all challengers and not pre-arranged. No private resupply, no private lodging."
- "[the] Tour Divide strives for equal opportunity within the GC. Whether doing an independent time trial or tackling the grand départ, TD requires that every challenger—from those living along the route to those living on other continents—have an equal playing field. Therefore, outside assistance with navigation, lodging or resupply (especially receipt of supplies from a non-commercial shipper) is prohibited."
- "Outside assistance is defined as any third party assistance in navigation or lighting and any non-commercial assistance in food resupply and/or lodging. A service is deemed 'commercial' when it is for commerce, equally available to all racers (ITT [individual time trial] + group-starters) year after year, preferably listed in the 'services' guide on ACA Route maps."

The Tour Aotearoa defines self-supported as "Do it all yourself, under your own steam."

Bikepacking races may be on trails, gravel or paved roads and many, such as the Tour Aotearoa, include all of these. As the popularity of bikepacking has increased, so has the opportunity for racing and there are bikepacking races regularly held around the world. The longest regular race is the Trans-Canada Ultra which is over 12,000 km. Arguably the most difficult is the Tour Te Waipounamu or the Silk Road Mountain Race due to the extreme remoteness of the terrain.

Races such as the Transcontinental Race are highly organized with an entrance fee, and strict rules to be followed at risk of disqualification. Others such as the Arizona Trail Race and Tour Divide are "not an organized or sanctioned event in any way. It's simply a group of friends out to ride their bikes on the same route at the same time". The latter still attract competitive riders who endeavor to ride the routes as fast as possible and set a fastest known time, at the same time as others ride at a more leisurely pace. This range of contrasting approaches is reflected in the stories of The Cordillera which is an annual book cataloguing the experiences of riders on the Tour Divide race.

== See also ==
- Bicycle basket
- Bicycle touring
- Bicycle trailer
- Mixed terrain cycle touring
