= Ortlieb =

Ortlieb may refer to:

== Given name ==
- Ortlieb, minor figure in Germanic heroic legend
- Ortlieb of Strasbourg (fl. 12th–13th century), German theologian
- Ortlieb of Zwiefalten (d. 1164), German historian

== Surname ==
- Alfred Ortlieb (b. 1888), French cinematographer
- Nina Ortlieb (b. 1996), Austrian skier
- Patrick Ortlieb (b. 1967), Austrian skier
- Robert Ortlieb (1924–2011), American sculptor

== Other ==
- Ortlieb Sportartikel, German manufacturer of outdoor equipment
