= Lauf Cycling =

Icelandic bicycle brand

Lauf Cycles
- Type: Private Limited Company
- Industry: Bicycles
- Founded: December 2010; 15 years ago
- Founders: Benedikt Skúlason, Guðberg Björnsson
- Headquarters: Reykjavík, Iceland
- Products: Bicycles, bicycle forks, handlebars
- Website: www.laufcycles.com

Lauf Cycles is an Icelandic bicycle brand based in Reykjavík. They specialise in gravel bikes.

The company manufactures the Lauf Spring: a pivotless trailing link fork. A set of glass fiber springs are attached between the wheel set and the forks of a bike. Manufacturing is done in Iceland, with subsidiary dealers found in both Europe and the United States.

The company gained media attention when Canadian Cyclo-cross National Champion, Michael Van Den Ham used Lauf bikes for his successful competition wins in 2018.

In 2023, Lauf launched the Úthald (meaning "endurance" in Icelandic), marking their first foray into the road bike market.

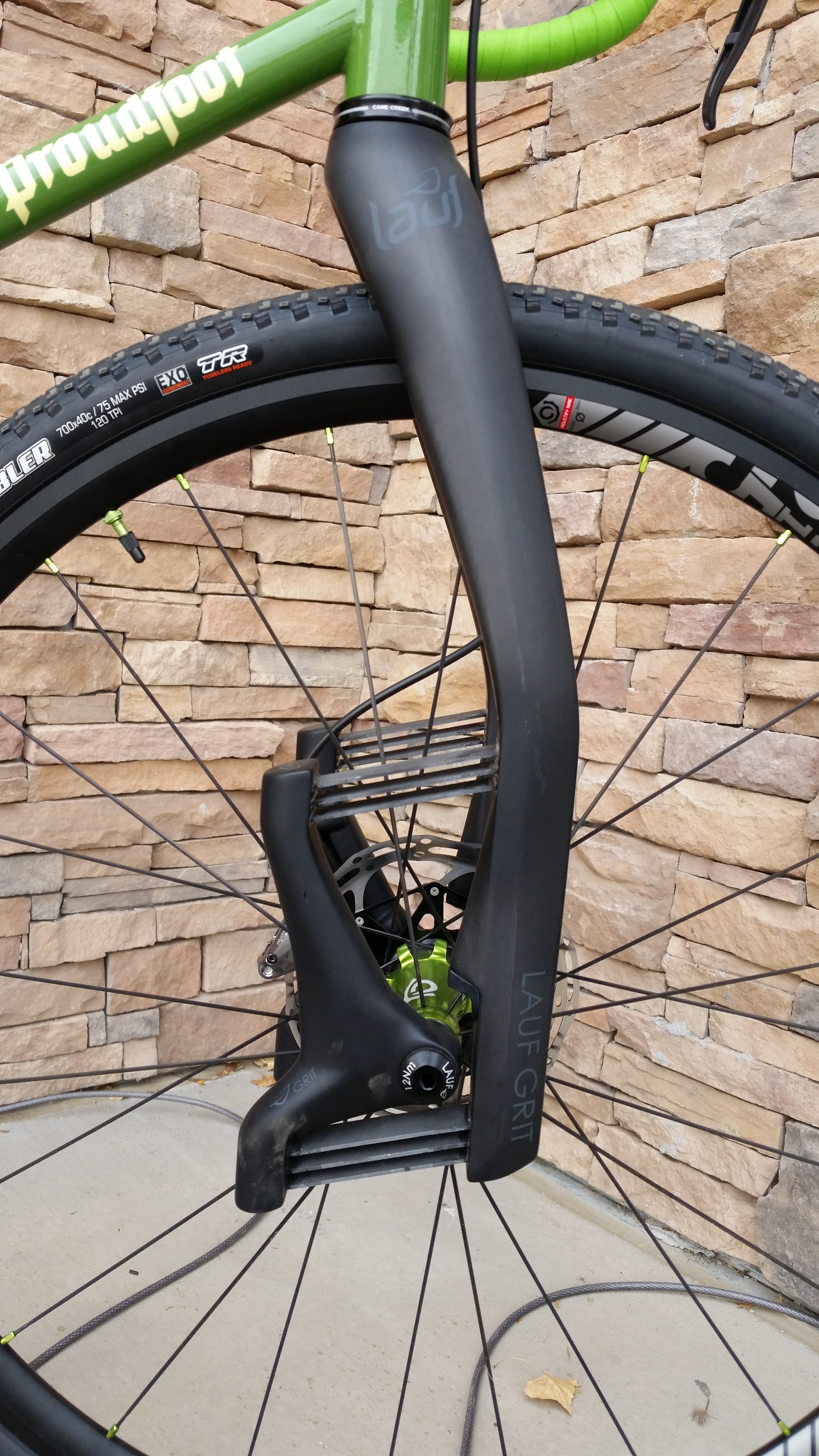
Lauf pivotless, trailing link fork

== See also ==
- Gravel bicycle
