= Safety reflector =

Safety item that reflects light

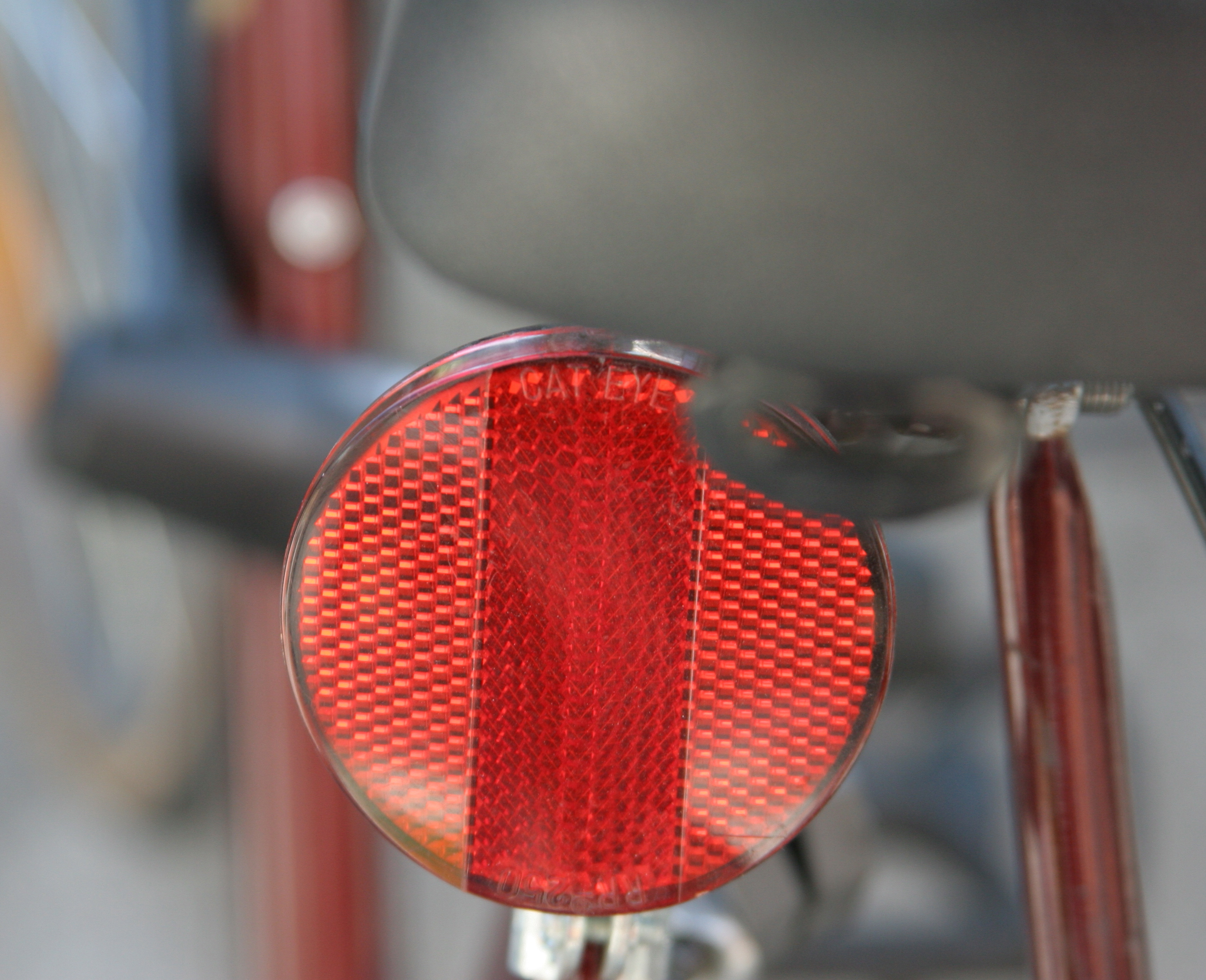
A rear reflector on a bicycle

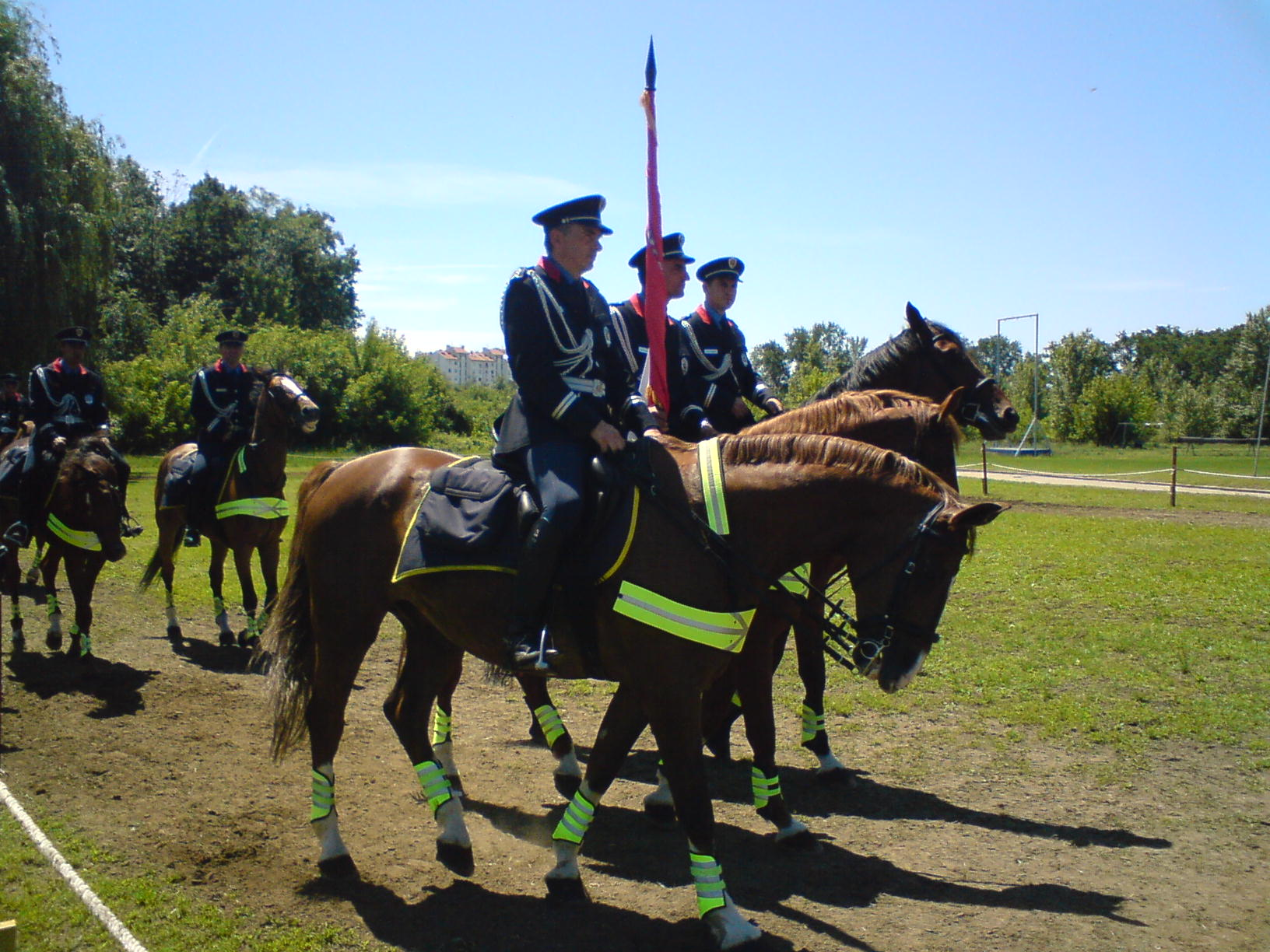
Reflecting device on horse.

A safety reflector is a retroreflector intended for pedestrians, runners, motorized and non-motorized vehicles. A safety reflector is similar to reflective stripes that can be found on safety vests and clothing worn by road workers and rescue workers. They are sometimes erroneously called luminous badges or luminous tags, but this is incorrect as they do not themselves produce light, but only reflect it.

== Functioning ==
A safety reflector aids visibility of a person or vehicle visible to on the road, as it reflects light from headlights of vehicles. Safety reflectors are especially useful where there are no streetlights.

Unlike reflective stripes that are permanently fixed to clothing, the safety reflector is a stand-alone device that can be attached to any article of clothing as needed, often using a safety pin and some string. For vehicles, the reflector is usually a fixed part. In bicycles, reflectors are usually on wheels, pedals, under the seat, on the back of the luggage rack, and in front of the front fork. In motorcycles, automobiles, and other vehicles, reflectors are built into the front and rear ends (and sides) next to the headlights and brake lights.

== Issue ==
Fatal traffic accidents at night often involve vehicles with drivers who fail to see pedestrians or bicyclists until they are too close to avoid collision. Reflectors are expected to increase visibility and contribute to safety.

== History ==
The reflector was first invented in 1917 in Nice by Henri Chrétien to provide the army a communication system the enemy could not intercept. The patent is labelled cataphote in 1923.

The cataphote was also invented by Garbarini by combining a convex lens and concave mirror. It was used for aviation, safety in Switzerland and advertising in France.

On 12 March 1925, the minister, the Réseau du Nord railway company, and the Touring-Club de France used reflectors to make level crossings visible at night.

In 1926, an automobile club, the Touring-Club de France, offered 180 signals with triangular reflectors to warn of the presence of level crossings. In 1927, fines were given in France to car owners which did not have the cataphote made mandatory by law. The same year, cataphote were sold for motorized vehicles, motorbikes, bicycles and any kind of trailers.

In 1946, the French regulation for catadioptres was NF R 143 11.

On 1 January 1950, safety reflectors were made mandatory on the rear side of French vehicles.

In January 1943, US highway patrolman Raymond Trask proposed the concept of single reflectors for pedestrians to help them be visible for drivers in a Popular Science publication.

In the late 1950s, Arvi Lehti, a farmer and plastic manufacturer from Pertteli, Finland, came up with the idea of a reflector suitable for pedestrian use. His initial idea was to join a pair of automotive reflectors together and attach them to clothing. This early concept was developed further by Lehti's company Talousmuovi into a small, light-weight reflector fit for commercial sale. In the 1960s, the Finnish police and transport authority wanted a reflector to improve pedestrian safety, so they asked Talousmuovi to design one. The reflectors they created were eventually made for sale to Finns and later the world.

Nowadays one can find reflectors of all possible shapes and colours, as design and fashion industries have turned their faces towards this diminutive gadget. Special 'clip-on' reflectors for bicycles and other human-powered vehicles are also common.

== European regulations ==
=== Reflector for vulnerable users and non motorized vehicles ===
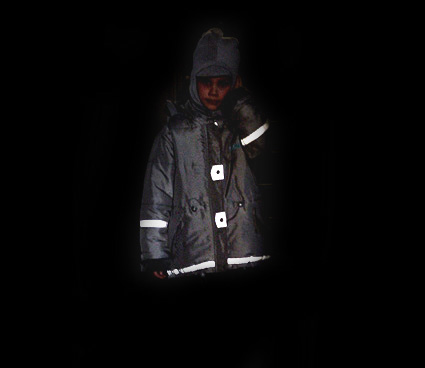
Reflectors

Within the European Union, safety reflectors for pedestrians must be certified to comply with the EN 17353:2020 safety standard which is an amalgamation of the prior certifiable EN 1150:1999 and EN 13356:2001 standards. This standard is specifically for "loose, reflective clothing and accessories for non-professional use". There are other standards for other types of reflectors such as professional safety vests and reflectors on bicycles or automobiles.

In Finland, Estonia, Latvia and Lithuania, pedestrians are required by law to wear safety reflectors when walking during dark conditions.

=== Reflector for motorized vehicles ===
The EU use Unece regulation number 3 to categorize safety reflectors in several class: IA, IB, IIIA, IIIB and IVA.

The EU use Unece regulation 104 for retro-reflective markings for vehicles of category M2 and M3 (transport of people), N (transport of good), O2, O3 and O4 (trailers). This regulation use colored markings.

The EU also has in its law the Council Directive 76/757/EEC of 27 July 1976 on the approximation of the laws of the Member States relating to reflex reflectors for motor vehicles and their trailers.

== Image gallery ==
The Corner Reflector reflects light back towards the source.

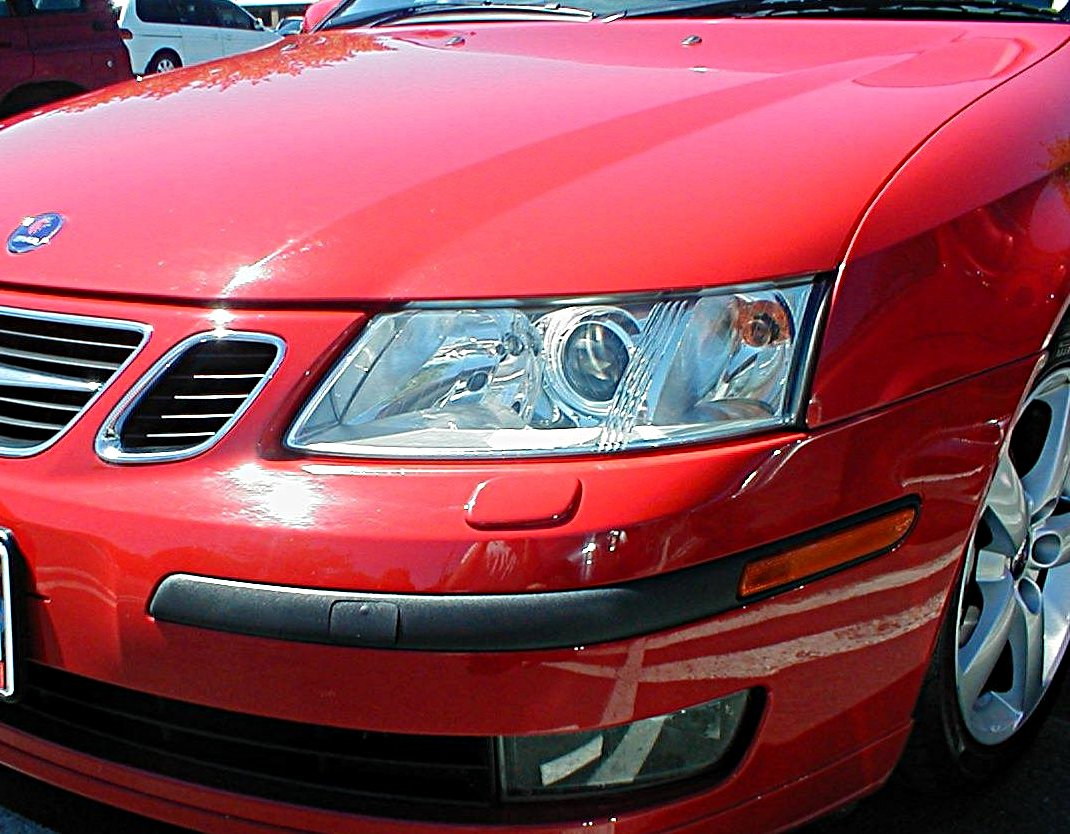
Car reflector (in the lower part of the bumper)

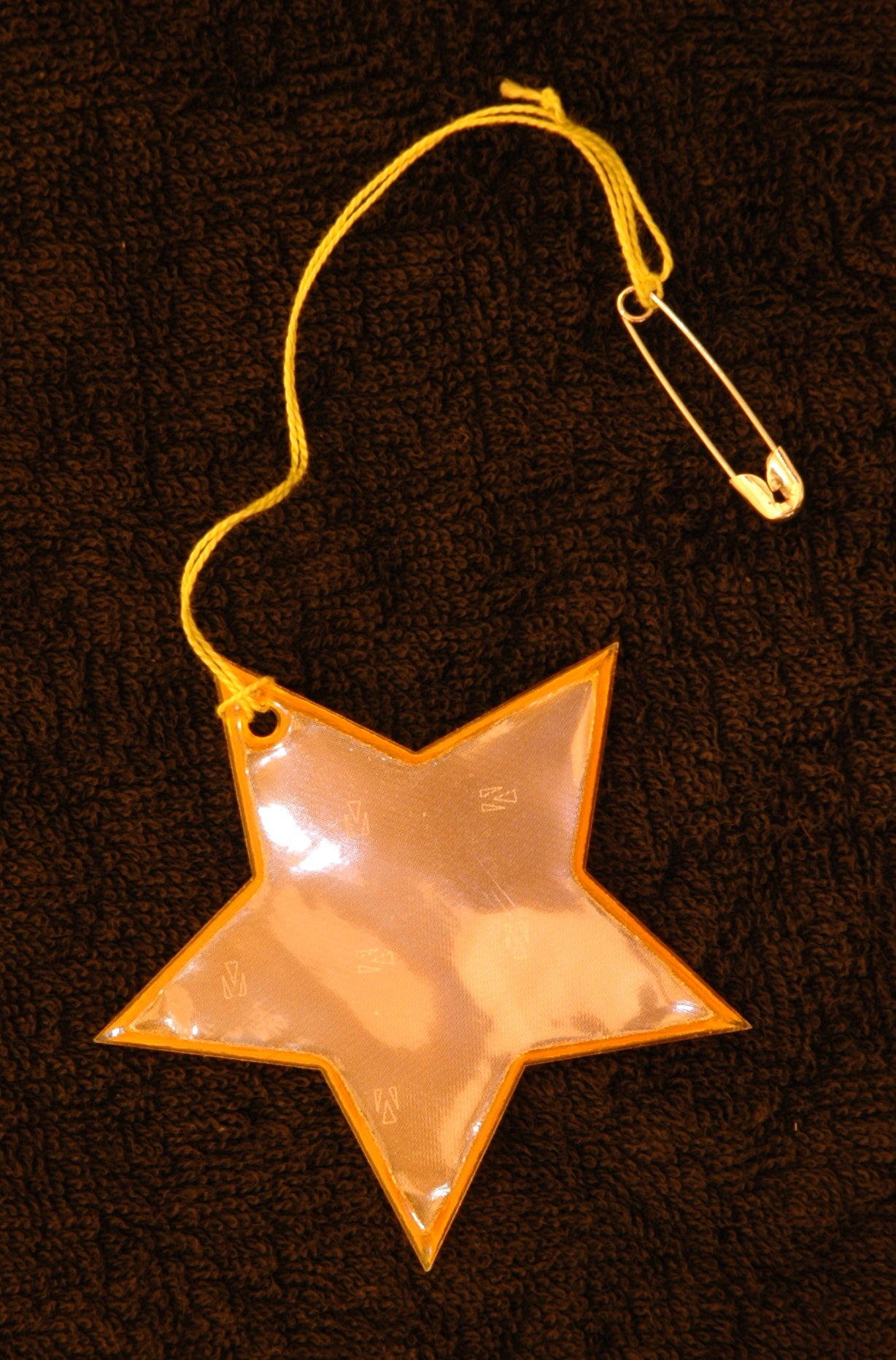
Star-shaped safety reflector with string and safety pin

== Bicycle reflector ==
Retroreflector and Cat-Eye on a bicycle

A bicycle reflector or prism reflector is a common safety device found on the rear, front and wheels of bicycles. It uses the principle of retroreflection to alert another road user of the bicycle's presence on the road.

The reflector is usually manufactured in the form of a moulded tile of transparent plastic. The outside surface is smooth, allowing light, such as from a car's headlights, to enter. The rear surface of the tile takes the form of an array of angled micro-prisms or spherical beads.

The light striking the rear, inside surface of the prisms or beads, does so at an angle greater than the critical angle thus it undergoes total internal reflection. Due to the orientation of the other inside surfaces, any light internally reflecting is directed back out the front of the reflector in the direction it came from. This alerts the person close to the light source, e.g. the driver of the vehicle, to the presence of the cyclist.

== See also ==
- High-visibility clothing
