= Mixed terrain cycle touring =

Method of cycle tourism

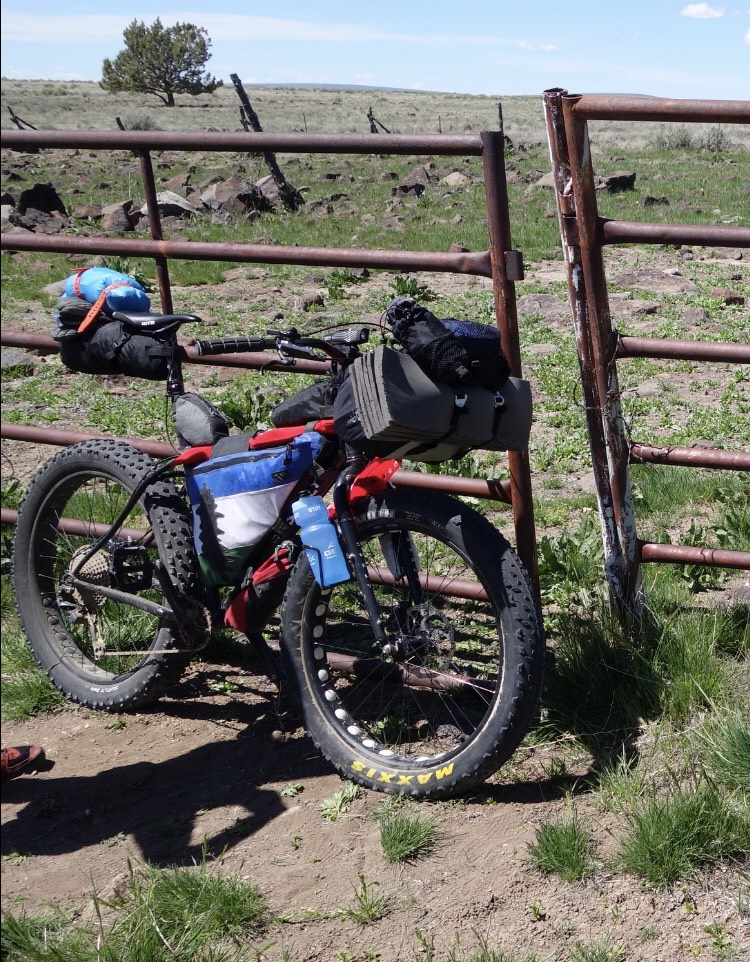
Bikepacking on a fatbike in Eastern Oregon USA

Mixed terrain cycle touring (nicknamed rough riding in North America and very occasionally rough stuff in parts of the United Kingdom) is the practice of cycling over a variety of surfaces and topography on a single route, with a single bicycle. The recent popularity of mixed terrain touring is in part a reaction against the increasing specialization of the bike industry.

Focusing on freedom of travel and efficiency over varied surfaces, mixed terrain bicycle travel has a storied past, one closely linked with warfare. By comparison, today's mixed terrain riders are generally adventure oriented, although many police departments rely on the bicycle's versatility. In parts of the world with unreliable pavement, the utility bicycle has become a dominant form of mixed terrain transportation. A new style of travel called adventure cycle-touring or expedition touring involves exploring these remote regions of the world on sturdy bicycles designed for the purpose. Off-road adventure cycling with lightweight gear, and often a rackless system, is now known as bikepacking.

Bikepacking is not a new phenomenon, and lightweight, soft-luggage touring has been in use since the 1890s. Early white settlers in Australia used bicycles with bags strapped to the handlebars and frame and under the saddle to carry loads into the Australian outback.

== Specialized versus all-round transportation ==
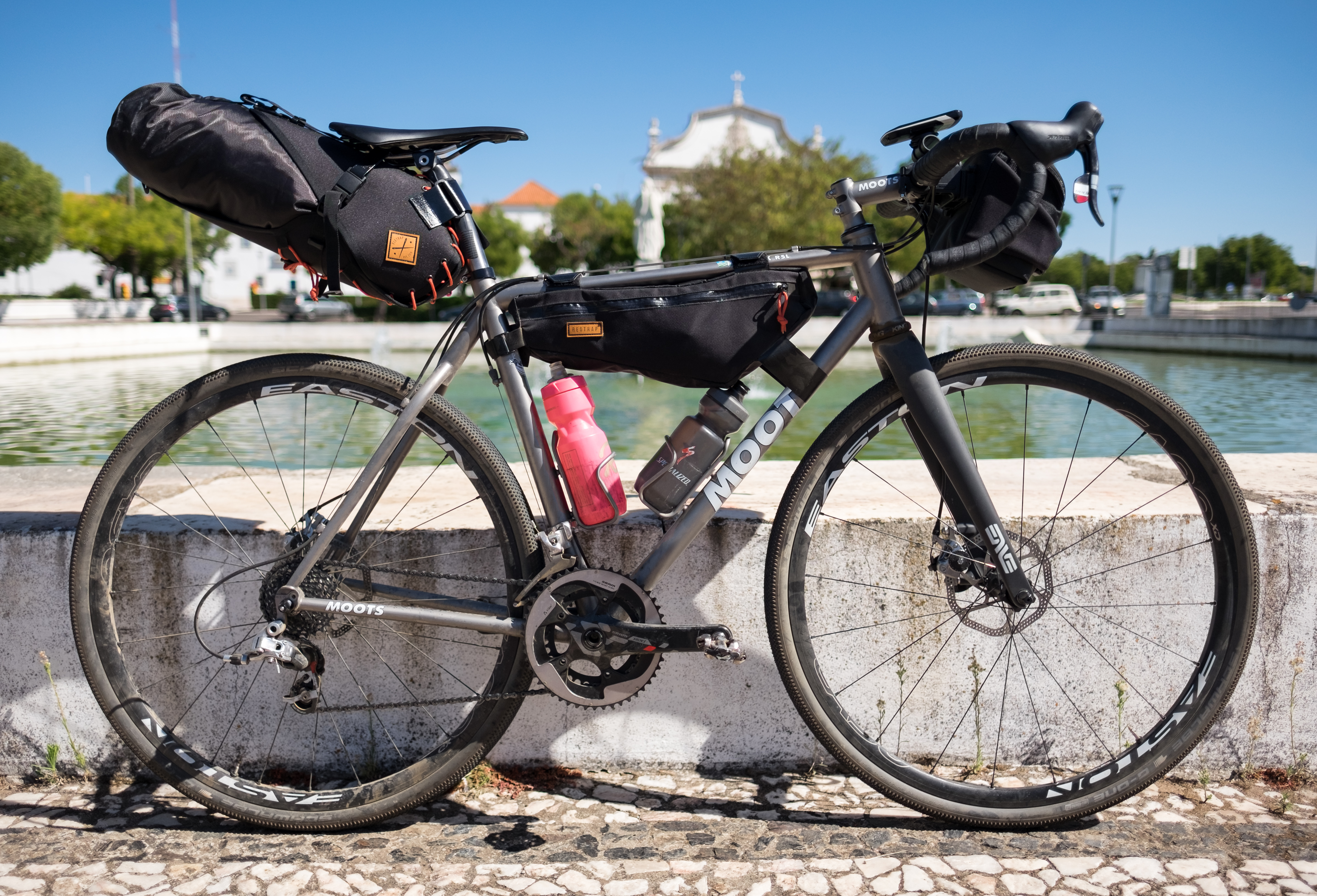
A road bike fitted with bikepacking bags in Portugal

Mountain biking has become increasingly more specialized for travel over technical dirt (hiking width) trails called single track, while road cycling focuses increasingly on maximizing travel over pavement. Traditional bicycle touring is typically considered road biking with travel primarily on paved roads, often carrying heavy loads of camping gear. Rough riding, in contrast, incorporates travel on both dirt and pavement; it stresses efficient travel on any surface or topography, a greater freedom of travel, and self-reliance. A hybrid form uses bikepacking bags developed for mountain bikes, but adapted to road bikes for lightweight, fast touring on improved roads.

== Types ==
Adventure cycle touring or expedition touring involves bicyclists attempting extended travel in remote regions of the world. Some "use bikes to go even further off the beaten track: they want to go where buses don't go at all and perhaps where other vehicles cannot get to either." Adventure tourists expect poor road conditions, unpaved roads and other mixed terrain.

Alpine cycle touring is rough riding in the mountains. Different than pure mountain biking, in alpine touring paved mountain roads are combined with dirt roads and single track for an efficient route through tough mountain terrain. Mountain features are not always avoided and are sometimes incorporated into the route, which may require alternative bicycle hauling techniques. This type of bicycle travel has a mountaineering flair, but it is generally done as adventure cycle-touring in developed countries where services are more prevalent and bike technology is slightly different allowing for more efficiency and speedier travel.

Mixed terrain bicycle racing includes Cyclo-cross, a style begun in Europe in the early 1900s, racers compete on mixed terrain courses on relatively flat courses. Mountain-cross, another form of mixed terrain racing staged on mountain courses is a recent invention.

Mixed terrain commuting may have contributed to the reaction against bicycle specialization. As bikes become more specialized, they become less suited for general commuting. Often commuters must travel on mixed surfaces or rough pavement even in urban environments. Often safer routes can be found away from heavy traffic, encouraging alternative and varied route selection.

Snow biking, also called icebiking or fatbiking, is another example of mixed terrain bicycle travel and a great example of the bicycle's flexible technology. Nearly any bike which allows medium or wide tires can be outfitted with special snow studded tires. Surly Bikes and other manufacturers make bikes with extra-wide tires specifically designed for deep snow. Events for racing and adventure riding across the snow have been created. The Iditarod Trail Invitational is an 1100-mile race billed as the "worlds longest winter ultra race across frozen Alaska". Another form of bicycle snow travel is called Skibobbing or ski biking which replaces wheels for skis.

Bikepacking, is the synthesis of mountain biking and minimalist camping, simply put, bikepacking. It evokes the freedom of multi-day backcountry hiking, but with the range and thrill of riding a mountain bike. It's about exploring places less traveled, both near and far, via singletrack trails, gravel, and abandoned dirt roads.

== Preferred bicycles ==
The preferred bike for mixed terrain travel in North America and Europe is called an "all-in-one" or "all-rounder". They are a synthesis between road bikes, touring bikes and mountain bikes. Examples of bikes that are appropriate are:

- Gravel bikes or "adventure bikes" are a style that evolved in the 2000s specifically to enjoy mixed terrain riding. Often with wide drop bars, relaxed geometry for tricky descents, and fittings for carrying enough gear to be self-sufficient.
- Cyclo-cross bikes that are used for on and off-road racing, and monster cross bikes that accommodate mountain bike sized tires and allow for single track riding.
- Brevet or Randonneur bikes which originated in long, mixed-terrain rides. This breed of bike retains much of the speed and efficiency of a road bike on paved roads, while maintaining the necessary features for dirt and gravel. These unusual bikes have light frames with 700c or 650B tires and drop handlebars.
- Expedition touring bikes for travel in third world countries, in contrast, compromise some speed for heavy load carrying capacity and increased durability. This has come to mean a sturdy steel-framed bike with 26" (559 mm ETRTO) mountain bike sized wheels, no suspension, and either drop or flat handlebars.
- Adventure touring mountain bikes are designed to offer some of the specialized advantages of mountain bikes while offering cargo capacity for extended touring. This is often accomplished by loading the bike with ultralight backpacking gear (sometimes called "bikepacking"). These bikes are often employed in cross-country mixed-terrain races.

Beyond these types, adventure and alpine tourists have adapted a broad range of bicycles. Because of the relative obscurity of touring over adverse terrain, there is a large amount of experimentation and specialized, home-made equipment.

== Organizations and clubs ==
A few organizations and clubs promote mixed terrain touring. The biggest is the Adventure Cycling Association located in Missoula Montana. They are responsible for mapping the Great Divide Mountain Bike Route, the world's longest mapped mixed terrain route. The oldest, still functioning, club dedicated to rough riding may be The Rough Stuff Fellowship of Great Britain founded in 1955. The Rough Riders of Southern California and the Colorado Rough Riders in Golden, Colorado are two American clubs dedicated to mixed terrain bicycle travel.

== History ==
The history of mixed terrain bicycle travel begins with the bicycle itself. Early roads were rarely paved. In fact, the popularity of bicycle riding may have encouraged the paving of roads. Bicycle travel became very popular around 1885 with the development of the modern bicycle configuration which we still see in wide use today. By 1886 the United States Army started experimenting with bicycle infantry as a replacement for horses in mixed terrain environments. The Army's 25th Infantry Regiment unit (African American Buffalo Soldiers) stationed at Fort Missoula, Montana was chosen for the test. These hearty riders traveled from Missoula to Yellowstone National Park during one trip and from Missoula to St. Louis, Missouri for their final trial. Much of the mixed terrain route was on unimproved roads or through roadless areas. Although they succeeded in beating the best horse travel times, the Army abandoned bicycle travel in anticipation of yet a faster new technology just being developed, the automobile. Although the U.S. military has not relied on bicycles, other militaries throughout the world, out of necessity, have used bicycles extensively for travel in mixed terrain. During the Second Boer War (1899–1901) both sides used bicycles in combat. Bikes were primarily used for messenger service.

By World War I, the Italian Army developed a folding bicycle that could be carried on a soldier's back for easy transport over difficult mixed terrain and alpine obstacles. The Germans, French and British also used bicycles for mixed terrain travel in World War I. Mechanized transport was still fairly limited so bicycle travel was relied upon heavily. Mechanized transport during World War II was much more prevalent, but the bicycle was still used by Japanese, German and Italian troops to some extent. The Allies supplied a limited number of paratroopers with folding bikes. British paratroopers on folding bicycles raided a German radar unit at Ste. Bruneval, France.

Up until recently (2003), the Swiss Army still had a bicycle infantry unit. The Swiss were great believers in the virtues of mixed terrain bicycle travel. "A fully equipped man can fly down the mountainside at speeds up to 80 km/h (50 mph), and up to a distance of about 50 km (30 mi) the entire troop can reach a potential battle zone faster than mechanized troops. 'We can go through the woods, we can take short-cuts,' said Jean-Pierre Leuenberger, commander of the training school near Romont. But the important point, he added, was that his men were able to fight when they got there."

Some armies around the world still use bicycles even today. In the West, many police departments now rely on mixed terrain travel by police bicycle. These cops on bikes can quickly chase down a runner, maneuver through tight areas not available to cars and yet cruise down any paved road or path. Paramedic and emergency medical technician groups also use the bicycle for ease of access where ambulance travel is difficult.

Mixed terrain bicycle travel for pleasure & commerce has seen varying degrees of interest over the years. Cyclo-cross racing likely got its start when European road racers in the early 1900s began cutting through farm fields and over fences as a way to train and keep warm during the winter off season. Club riding in early 1900s Europe often included mixed terrain (called rough stuff or pass storming) as an integral part of typical routes. Early recreational cyclists would extend their biking range to include off-road cycling. "Evidence of how much rough stuff was viewed as an integral part of the experience for the touring cyclist can be found in the format of the BCTC (British Cycle Tourist Competition). Run by the CTC and inaugurated in 1952 until the late 1980s its aim was to find Britain's best tourist. Rough stuff riding was a key element and the organizers often went to great lengths to find awkward tracks, fords, etc. that would test a rider's skill."

By the 1950s in Europe, bike clubs were formed specifically around mixed terrain and off-road touring. In Great Britain, a club called Rough Stuff Fellowship was formed around mixed terrain and off-road touring. "The history of the RSF goes way back to its foundation in 1955, long before anyone had ever heard of Marin County. It was formed by cyclists who wanted to get away from roads and cycle on tracks, and byways." The Rough Stuff Fellowship is still an active club today. France also had a mixed terrain club called Velo Cross Club Parisien formed between 1951 and 1956. Not content with cyclo-cross racing of the day, around twenty French cyclists modified their 650-b bikes for mixed and off-road travel.

The beach cruiser bicycle entered the market in the early 1930s. These heavy single speed bikes sporting "balloon" tires could handle a variety of mixed terrain including moderately loose flat sandy beaches. Paper boys and couriers favored these bikes since they could handle the occasional gravel road with ease. However, as heavy single-speed bikes they were not good for hilly terrain and climbing. These bikes have made a comeback in recent years for their retro look. They are still good flat lander all-rounder bikes, great for cruising the beach or urban landscape. In the late 1970s cruiser bicycles, by then called "clunkers" became the inspiration for mountain bikes. Offering cheap material for experimentation, these clunkers were slowly turned into the modern mountain bike. Wider tires on lighter frames, with multiple gears proved to be a wildly successful combination for mixed terrain and truly rugged single track. Early mountain bike designs still make good mixed terrain vehicles, with slight modification. Unfortunately with current mountain bike advancements in suspension systems and other technical mountain bike features, the mountain bike of today is overkill and inefficient for mixed terrain touring. Recently a new synthesis between road bikes and mountain bikes has begun to take shape as riders look away from specialization and back towards bicycles that can handle mixed terrain travel.

== See also ==
- Bikepacking
- Backpacking (hiking)
- Outline of cycling
- Trail
- Trail riding
