= Frame bag =

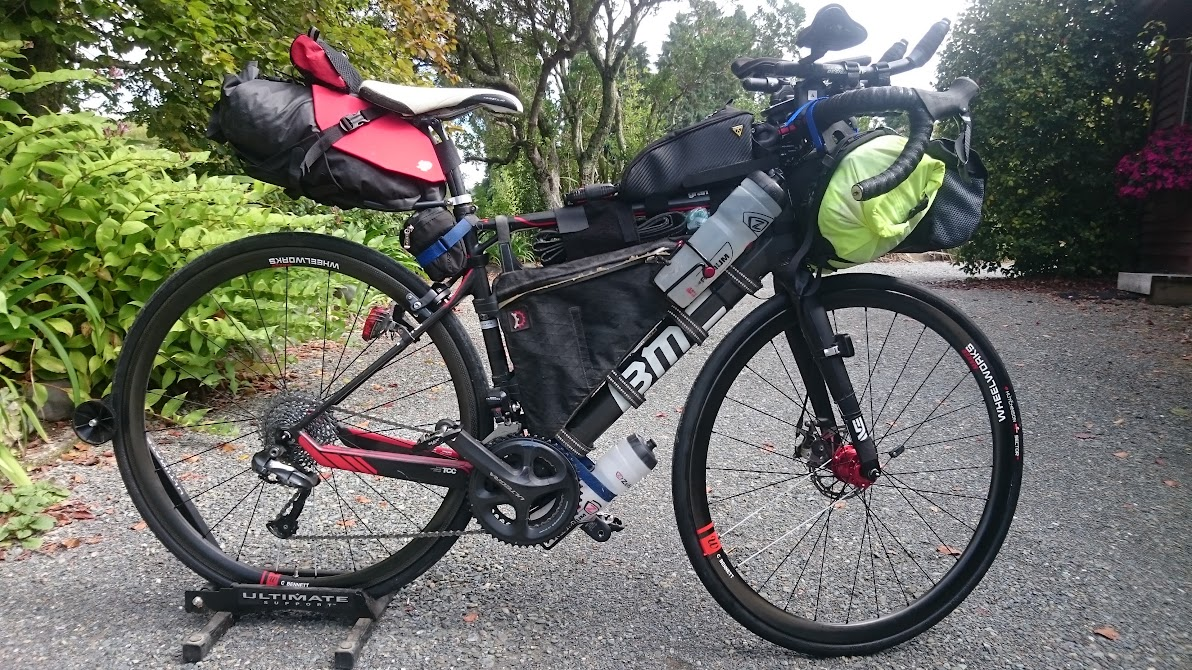
A bikepacking bike displaying a large frame bag alongside other additional storage options

In bicycling, a frame bag is a bag attached within the main triangle of a bicycle frame. They are used to add luggage capacity to your bike in a low-profile way without impeding on the ability to pedal and to distribute weight across the bike. Frame bags are common on touring bicycles, racing bicycles, and cross country mountain bikes. They're ideal for carrying tools, spare parts, electronics, snacks, and other items that may need to be easily accessed while riding. Frame bags help maintain a bike's center of gravity, improving balance and handling.

Frame bags can vary a lot, (2-10 litres) from small wedges designed to carry a few extra items on a ride to bags that completely fill the space within a bike frame's main triangle. They typically have multiple attachment points to all three frame members to keep it stable and in position. For attachment most bags use webbing although some bags and bikes feature braze-ons, enabling you to bolt a bag directly to the bike.
