= Luggage carrier =

Bicycle device for carrying cargo

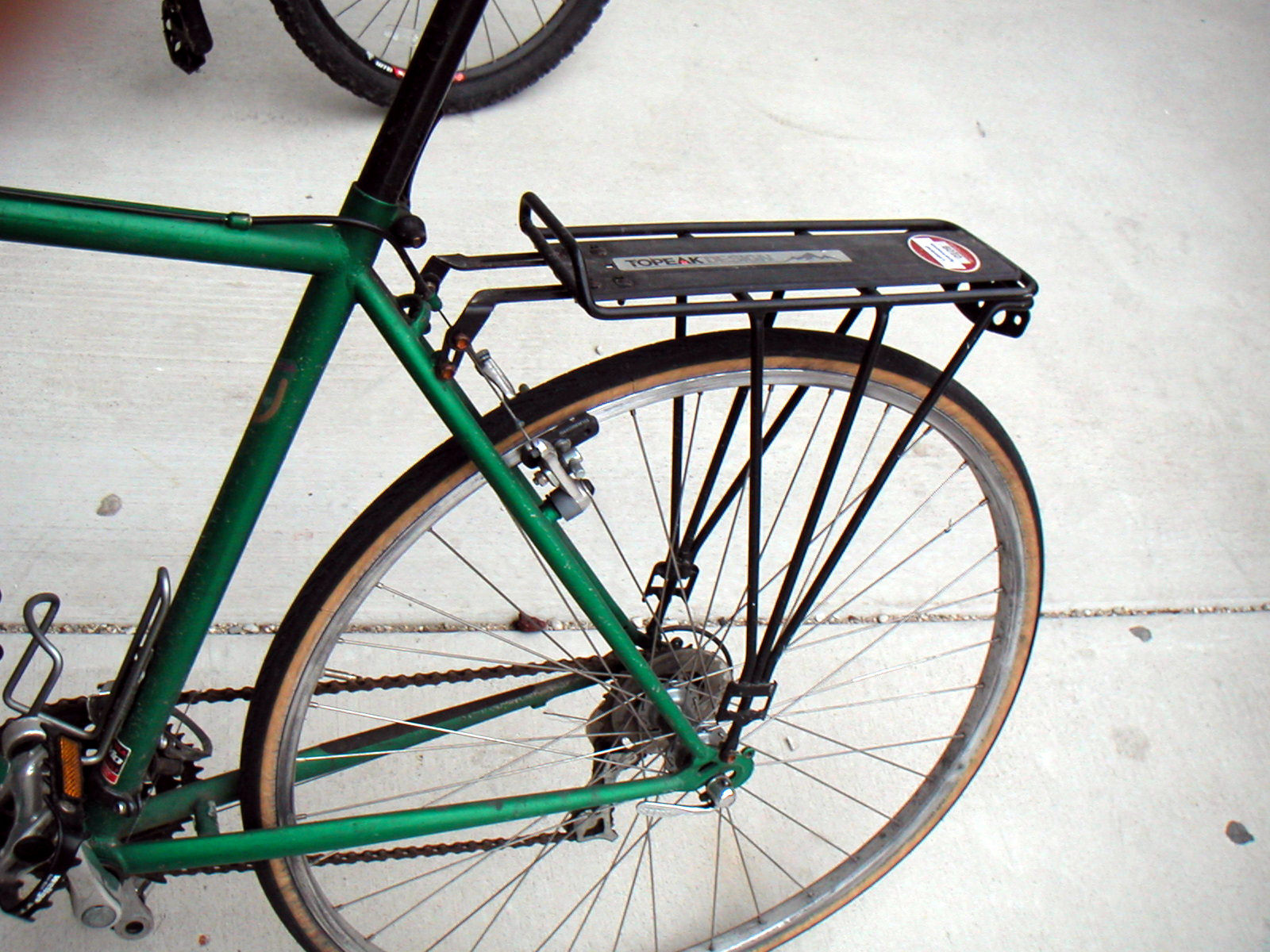
A rear rack mounted on a bicycle for road use.

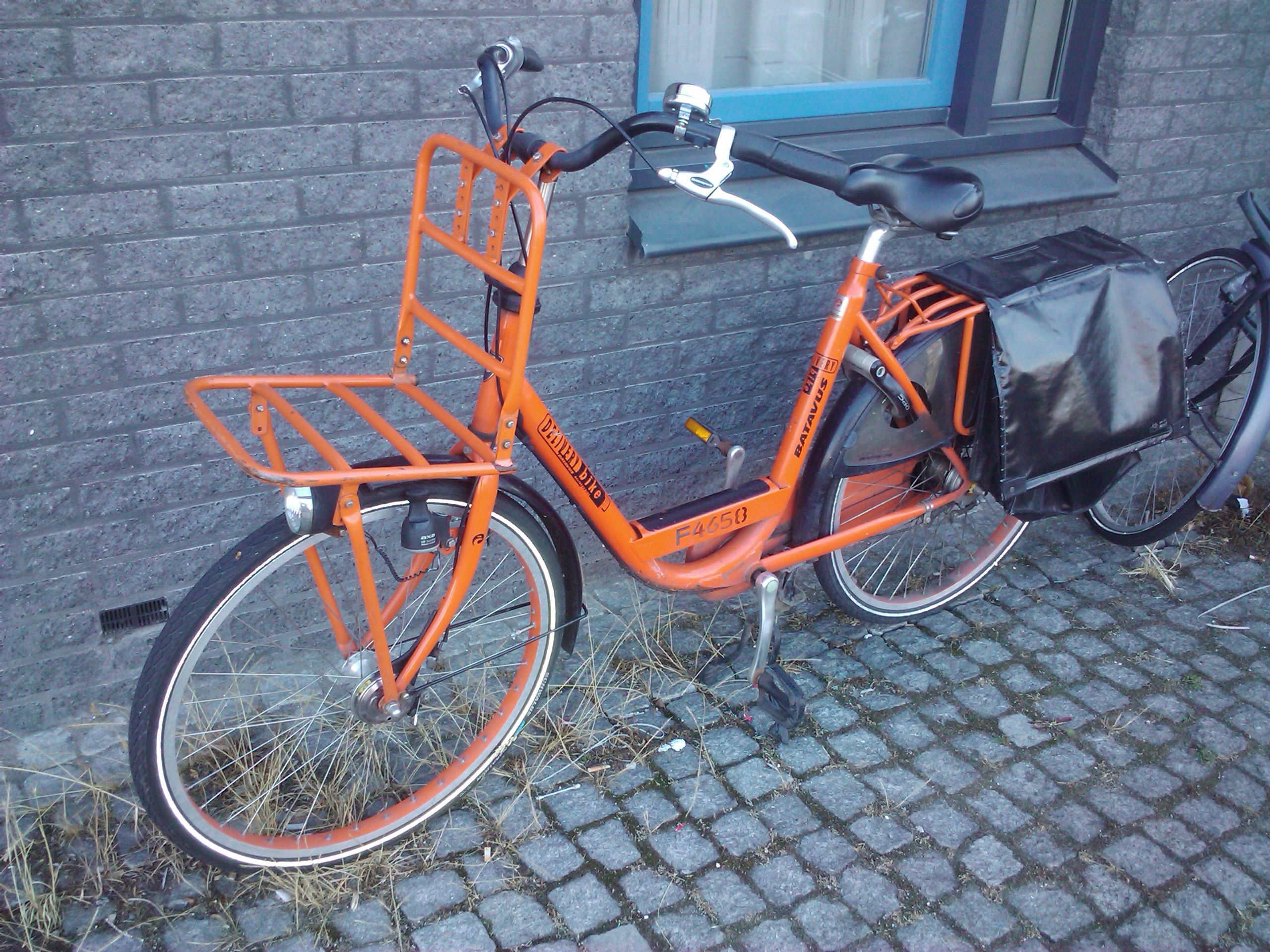
A porteur-style front rack and rear rack with panniers on a utility bicycle.

A luggage carrier, also commonly called a (bicycle) rack, is a device attached to a bicycle to which cargo or panniers can be attached. This is popular with utility bicycles and touring bicycles.

Bicycle luggage carriers may be mounted on the front or rear of a bicycle. The rear mount is more common. Racks on the front are mostly reserved for utility and cargo bikes. A special type of front rack is a low rider which is mainly used for bicycle touring.

The term luggage carrier can also refer to a device with two wheels used to wheel luggage or something of similar weight from one place to another, similar to a dolly (hand truck) but lighter and usually able to be folded up.

== Mounting ==
Bicycles may have eyelets, possibly tapped with a standard thread, at the dropouts on the rear chain stays, and on the front fork blades. Heavy-duty carriers are often mounted directly at the axles. Mounting a bike rack is possible without eyelets, but requires additional hardware. A style of rack clamps only to the seatpost, does not require eyelets or additional hardware, but has a limited capacity.

Luggage carriers can be mounted on recumbent and folding bicycles, but may require customization or additional hardware. Additionally, specialized or customized luggage carriers are often required on bicycles with (rear) disc brakes or full suspension.

A common type of child seat designed for carrying an infant on a bicycle mounts to a rear luggage carrier. Some models of child seat are not attached to a luggage carrier but are fixed to the seat tube.

Some luggage carriers come in more than one size to accommodate different sized frames. A common variation is for there to be a different model for road bicycles and mountain bikes.

== Capacity ==
Rear-mounted luggage carriers are typically designed and tested for a maximum load of 25 kg (55lb), some models even for up to 40 kg (90lb). For front-mounted carriers, a typical design load limit might be 2×10 kg (2 × 20lb). Most luggage carriers are not designed to withstand the weight of an adult person.

== Construction ==
Luggage carriers are commonly constructed from aluminum, steel, or some combination of the two. Components may consist of tubing, extrusions, or castings. They may be welded, riveted, or bolted together.

Panniers may be mounted to front and rear luggage carriers. Removable panniers hook onto the top edge of the carrier and then are held in place by a spring or elastic cord that hooks near the wheel axle at the bottom. Some luggage carriers have an extra, lower, rail to hang panniers on, this provides better stability and more space on the platform.

Some bikes, such as longtail bicycles, porteur bicycles, or the Dutch typical transportfiets, may be built with an integrated front or rear luggage carrier. These are usually tested to a higher weight capacity.

In Europe, it is common for rear racks to have a mounting point for a reflector or rear light. It is common for the mounting point to have 2 holes which fits M5 bolts, spaced 50 or 80 mm (2″ or 3″) apart.

== Standards ==
- European Standard EN 14872: Bicycles – Accessories for bicycles – Luggage carriers, British Standards Institution, 2006. EN 14872
- International Standard ISO 11243: Cycles – Luggage carriers for bicycles – Concepts, classification and testing, International Organization for Standardization 2016. In this ISO carriers can be fastened an EN 14344 child seat, using the seat fixing brackets. ISO 11243:2016
- The MIK profile luggage carrier (an acronym for "Mounting Is Key") is a standardised luggage carrier pattern marketed as an "open platform", which enables attachment of accessories with MIK compatible carrier plates. The plates are mounted to the accessory and clicks onto the carrier, and is marketed as a "revolutionary" system enabling secure attachment of and easy swapping between accessories such as for example shopping baskets, bike crates or dog baskets. The MIK luggage carrier form factor was developed in collaboration between the Taiwansese brand Massload (Tsai Jung Enterprise) and the Dutch brand Basil, and in 2023 over 50 brands participated on the MIK standard, including Giant, Kalkhoff, KOGA, Merida, and Trek. Competing mounting methods include KlickFix and Snapit.

== Image gallery ==
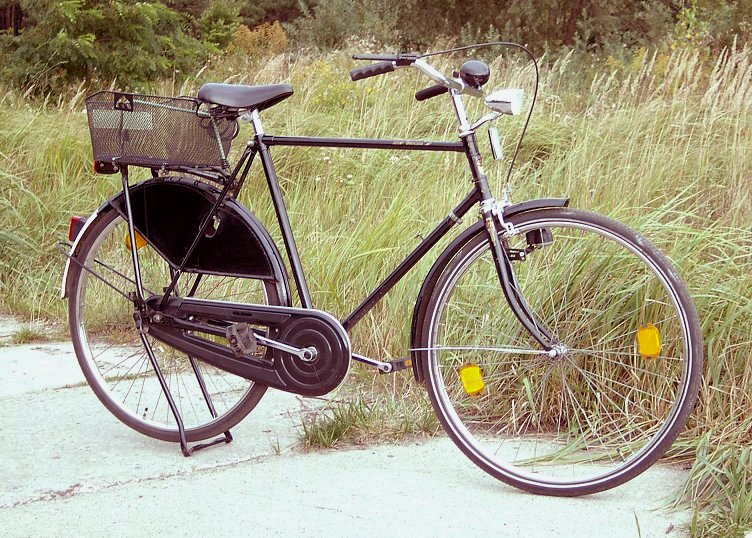
A Dutch utility bicycle with a rack attached directly at the rear wheel axle.

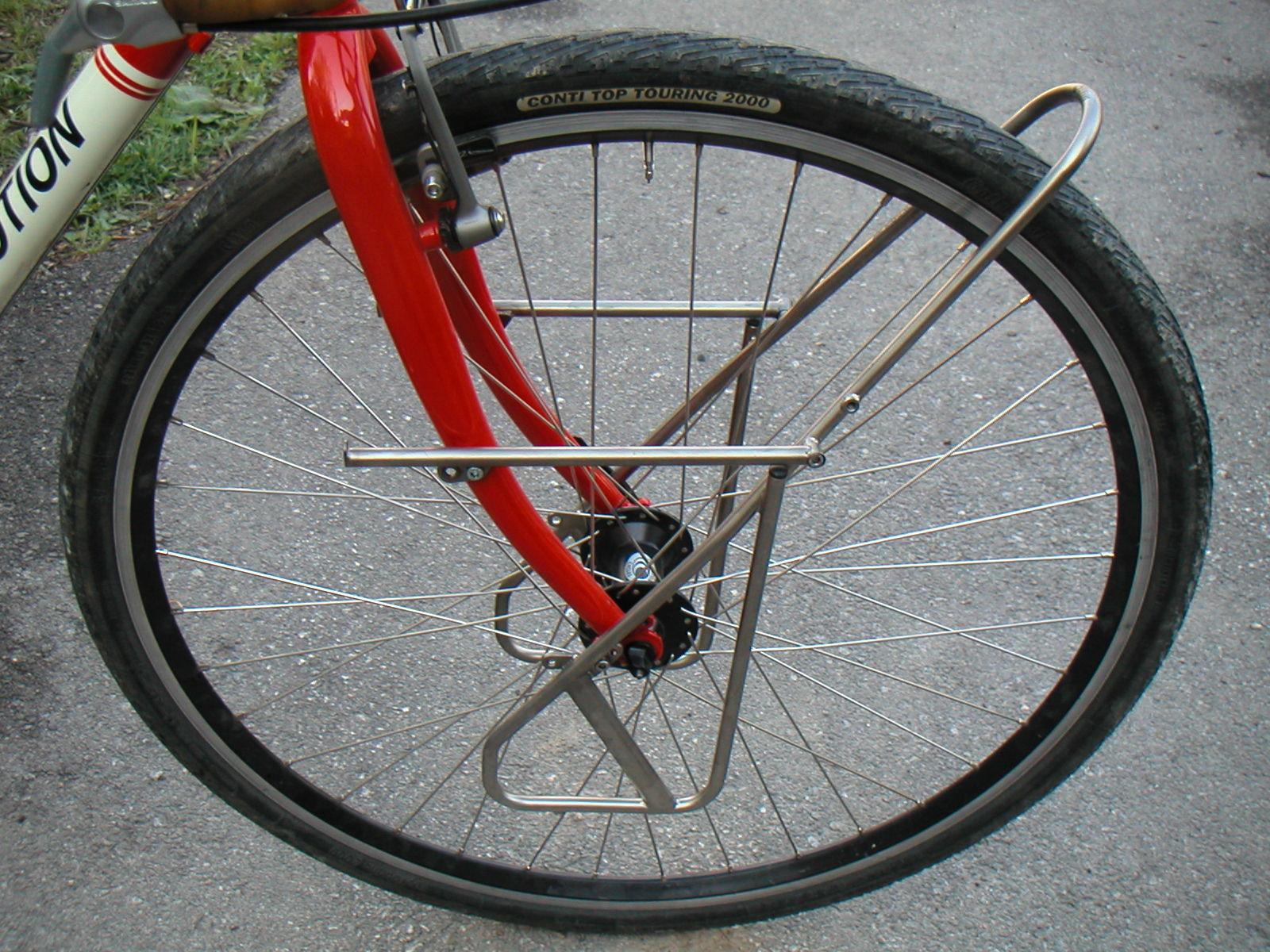
A low rider mounted on a touring bicycle for mounting panniers.

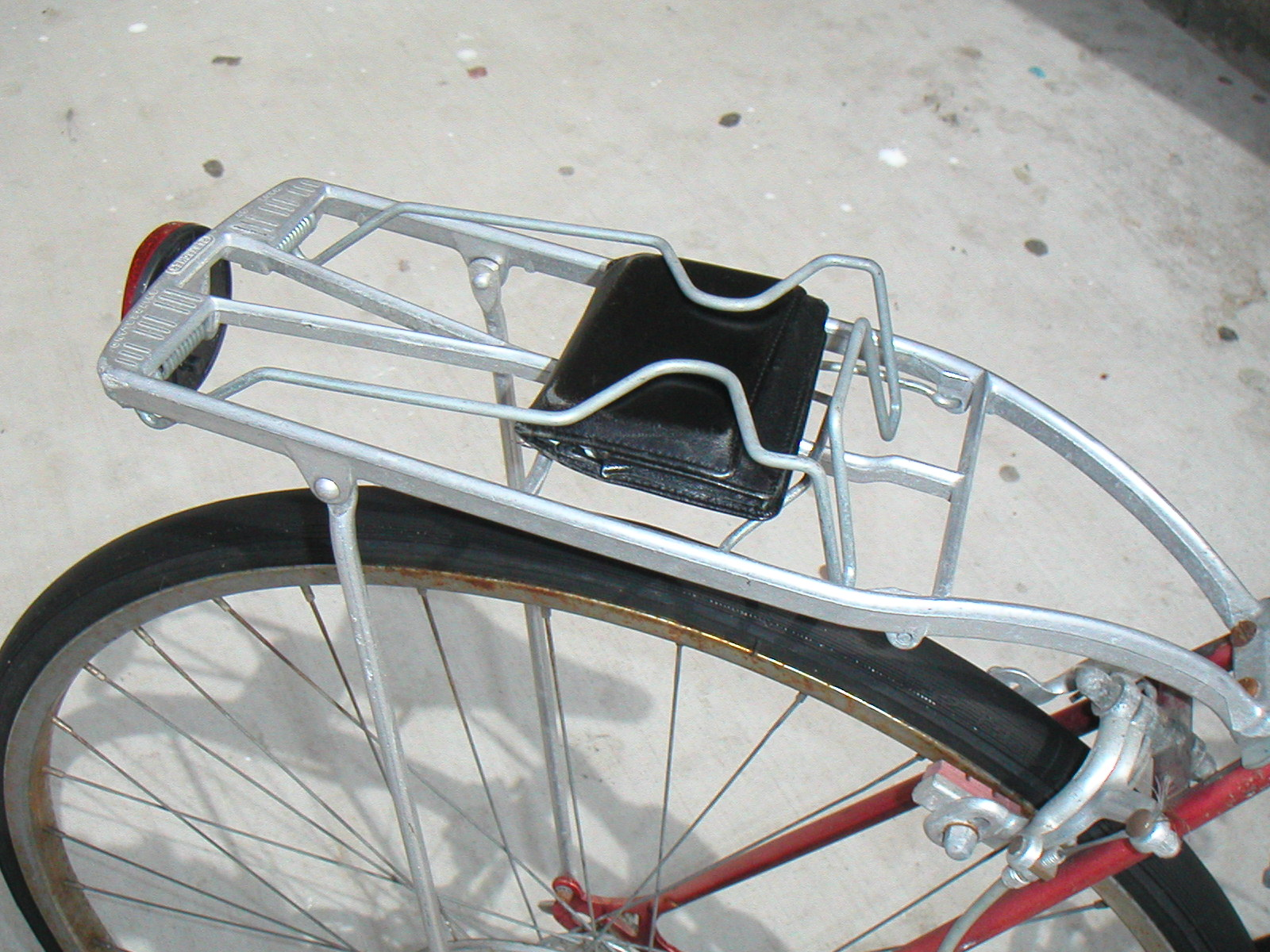
A cast aluminum rear rack with integrated spring-loaded clamp.

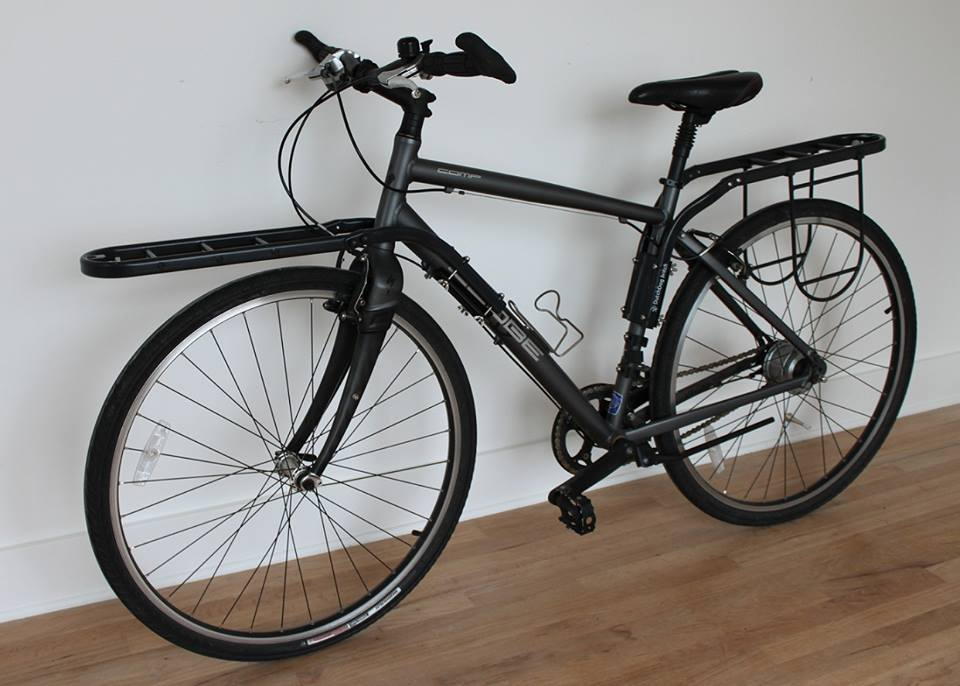
A bicycle with front and rear luggage rack that mounts to the frame.

== See also ==
- Bicycle basket
- Bicycle wheel
- Gear case
- Cargo bike
- Outline of cycling
- Low rider bicycle luggage carrier
- Mudguard
- Utility cycling
- Xtracycle (an extreme form of bicycle mounted luggage carrier)
