= Pannier =

One of a pair of baskets, bags, boxes, or similar containers

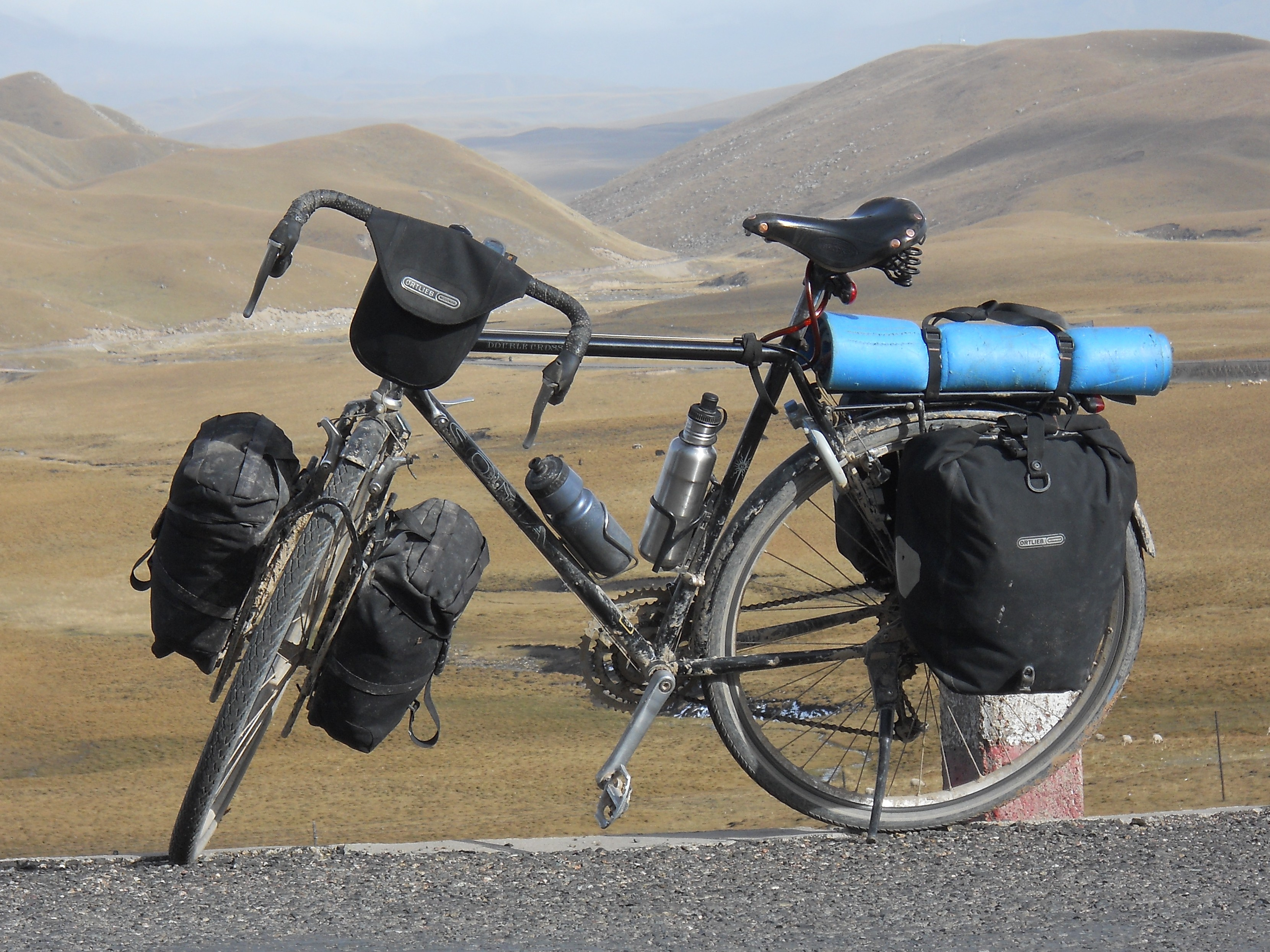
Modern touring bicycle with panniers

A pannier /ˈpæniər/ is a basket, bag, box, or similar container, carried in pairs either slung over the back of a beast of burden, or attached to the sides of a bicycle or motorcycle. The term derives from a Middle English borrowing of the Old French panier, meaning "bread basket".

== Animal panniers ==
Traditional panniers for animal transport are typically made of canvas, leather, or wicker. Modern panniers may be rectangular boxes of hard-sided plastic. Panniers are loaded in such a manner as to distribute weight evenly on either side of the animal. For horse packing, and when carrying particularly heavy loads on other animals, they are supported by a pack saddle to distribute weight more evenly across the back of the animal. In some cases, additional items are placed on the back of the animal, between the panniers.

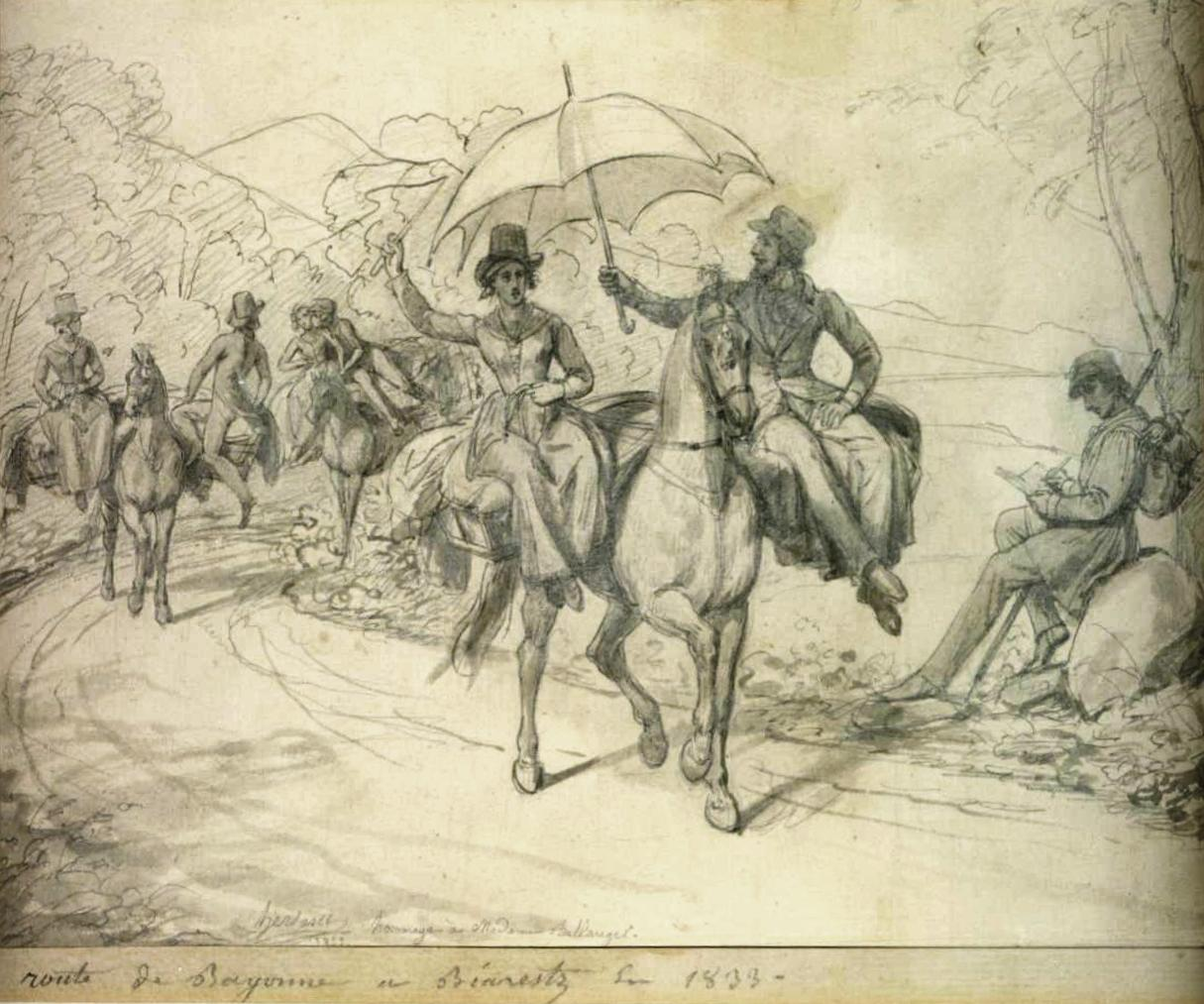
Tourists riding in panniers in France, in a drawing by Louis Hersent, 1833

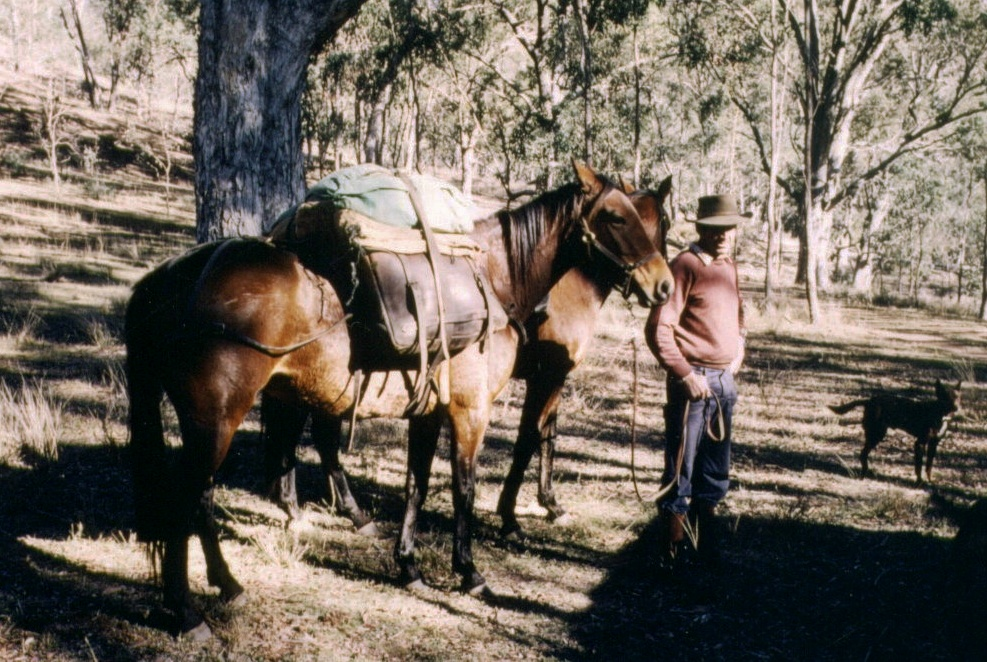
Pack horse with soft-sided panniers

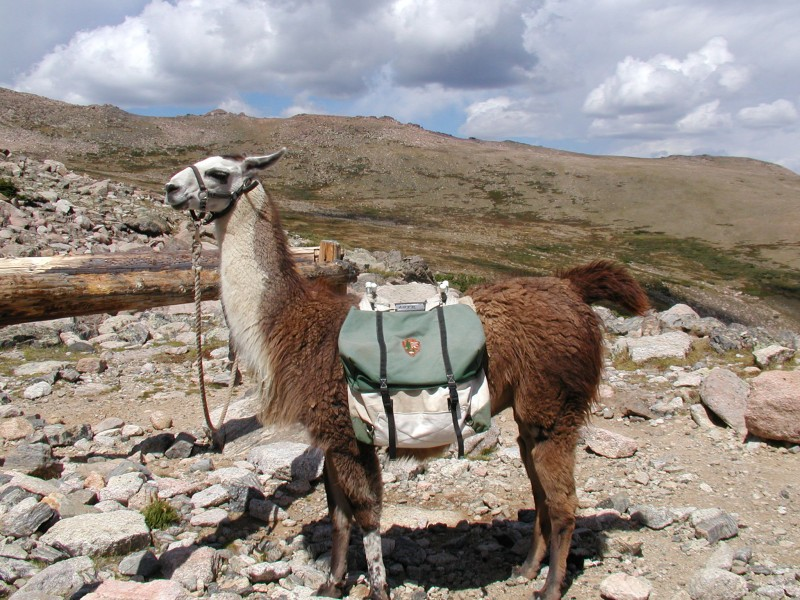
Panniers on a llama used to transport waste in a U.S. national park, 2005

== Bicycle panniers ==
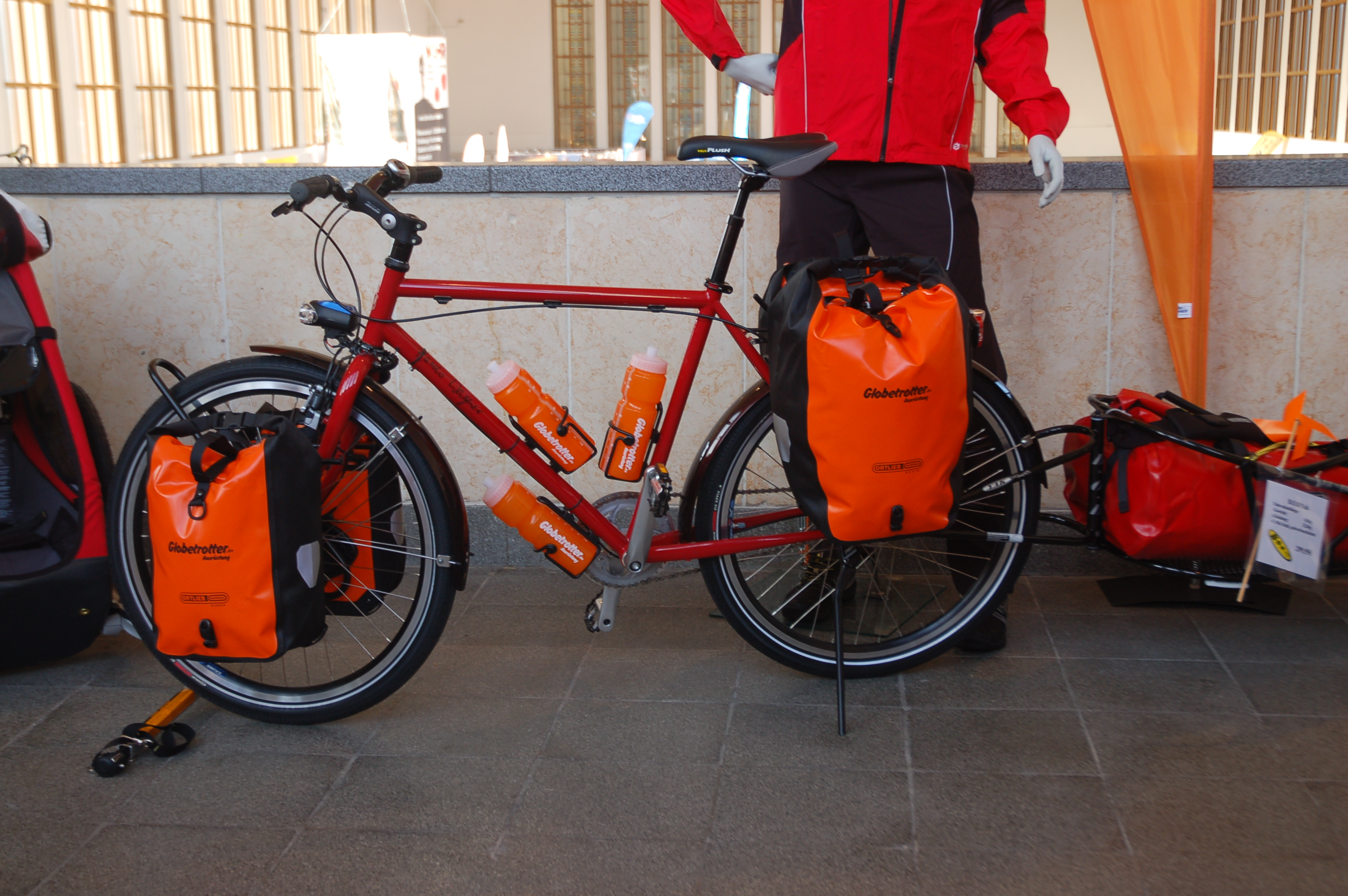
Modern waterproof bicycle touring panniers from Ortlieb, Berlin, 2009

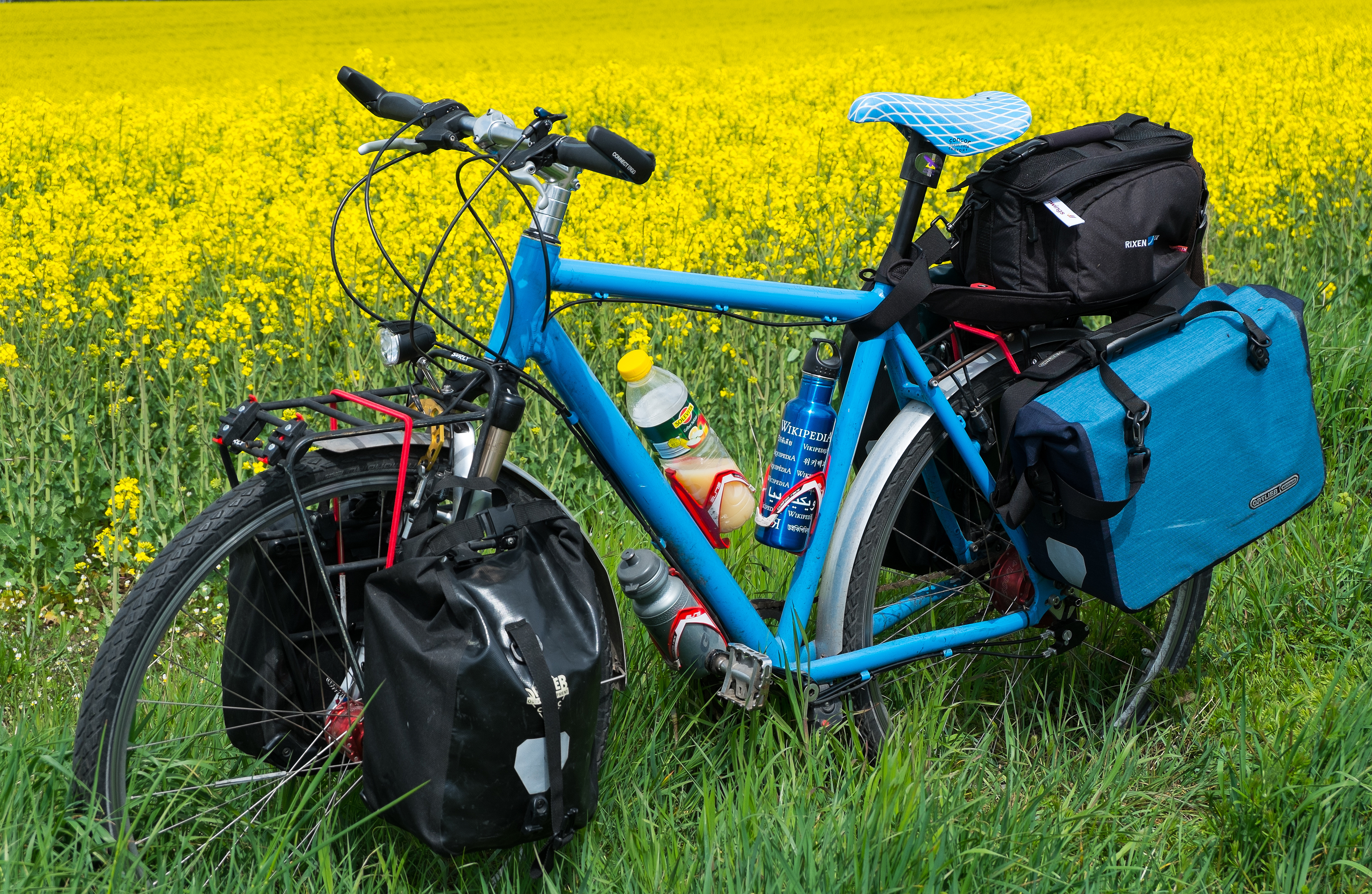
Touring bicycle with several panniers

There are many styles of bicycle panniers. Touring panniers are usually sold in pairs, intended to hold enough equipment for self-sustained tours over days or weeks. The most common setup for touring is to use a pair of smaller panniers (10 to 15 liters each) mounted on a low rider and a pair of larger ones on the rear carrier (20 to 30 liters each).

Panniers for bicycle commuters are designed to hold laptop computers, files and folders, changes of clothes or shoes and lunches. There are also panniers that convert to backpacks or shoulder bags for easier carrying when not on a bicycle.

Panniers designed specifically for bicycles were patented by John B. Wood of Camden, New Jersey, in 1884. Hartley Alley designed a handlebar bag and other bicycle luggage that he manufactured and sold under the Touring Cyclist brand in the 1970s until his retirement in 1984.

=== Construction ===
Bicycle panniers are usually made of nylon or other synthetic fabric that can be stitched, or, in the case of waterproof panniers, welded together.

As bicycles are often ridden in the rain, many panniers are built to be water-repellent or waterproof by themselves. Others include built-in rain-covers, or rain-covers are offered as accessories. The shape of the pannier may be enforced by a frame or stiffening panel made of plastic or metal to help keep it in place and prevent it from contacting a wheel.

Panniers are usually built to attach to a rear rack or front rack already fitted to the bicycle. Removable panniers hook onto the top edge of the rack and are often held in place by a latch or elastic mechanism.

== Motorcycle panniers ==
Motorcycle panniers are generally hard box containers with lids, made of metal or hard plastic. The panniers may be permanently fixed to the motorcycle or may be removable. Soft cases may be leather or fabric, usually without permanent mountings, and are often called saddlebags or "throwovers".

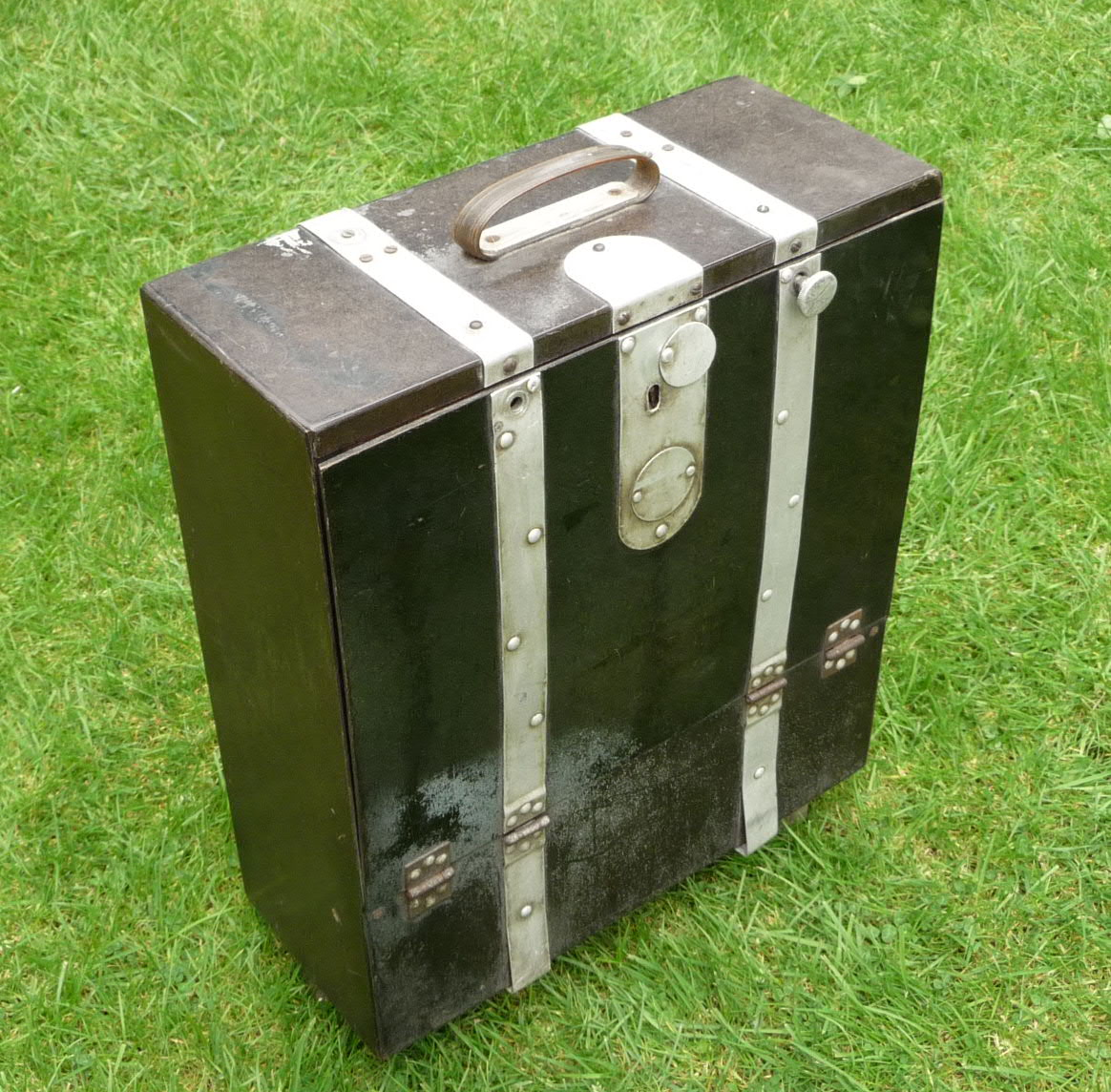
Craven Silver Arrow pannier from the 1950s

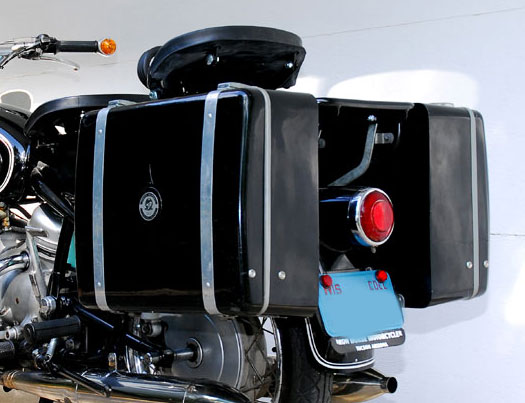
Craven Golden Arrow panniers from the 1960s

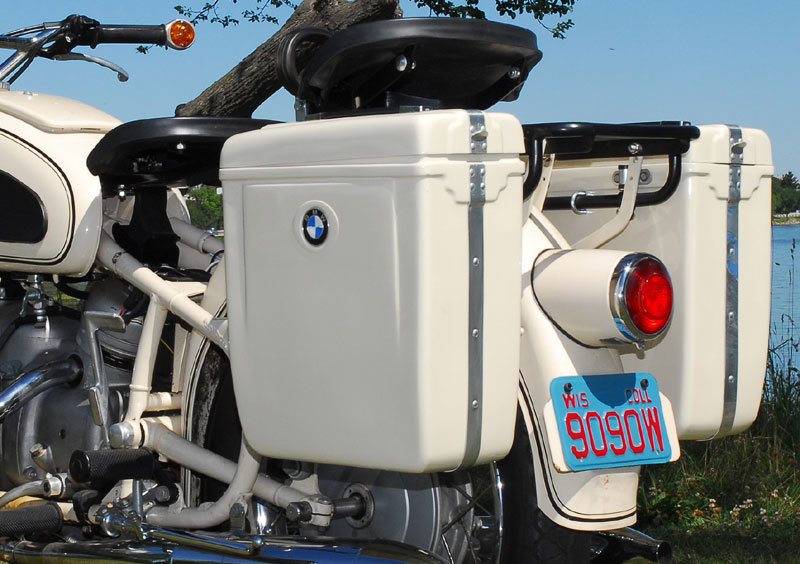
Craven Concorde panniers

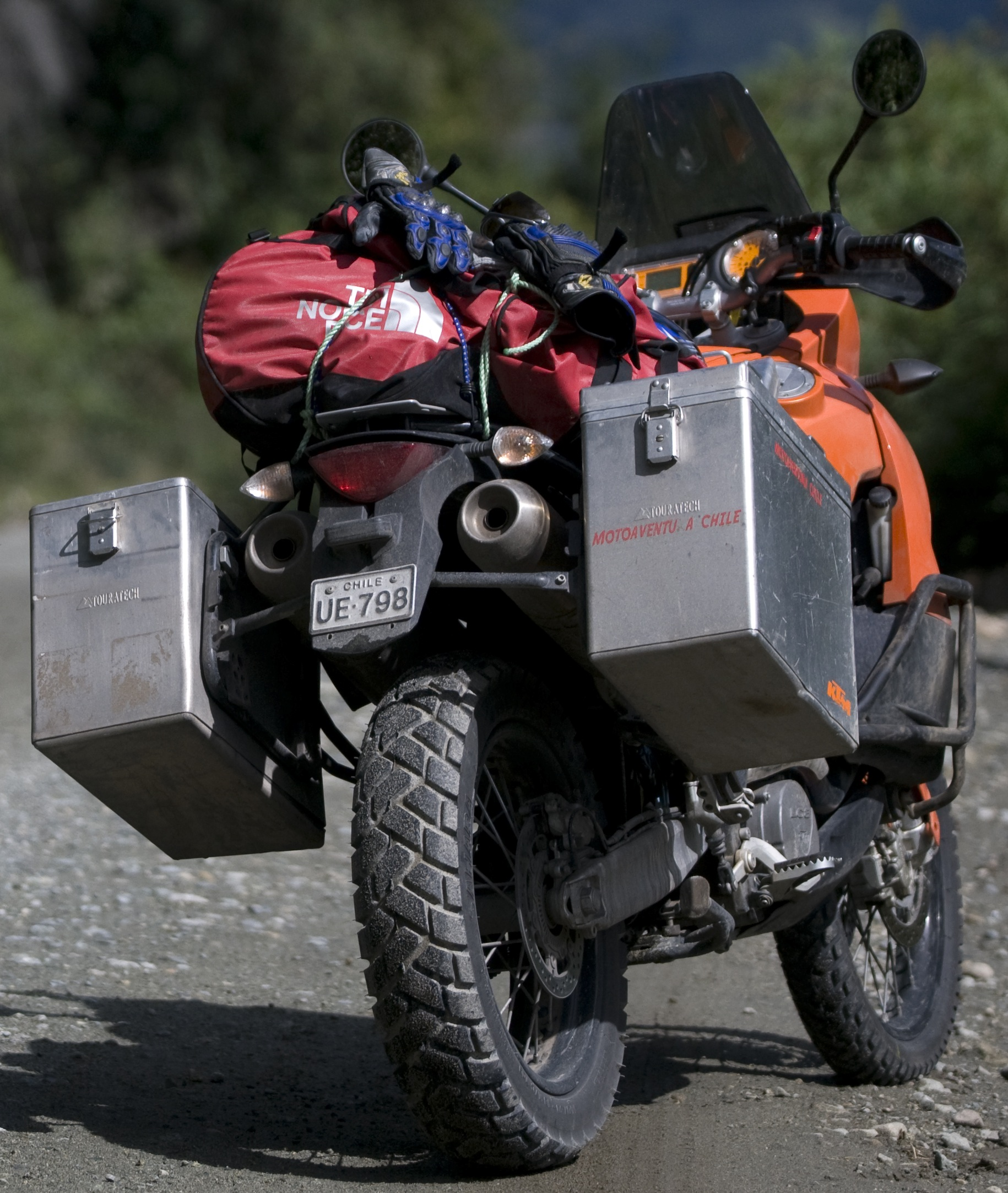
Panniers fitted to a motorcycle

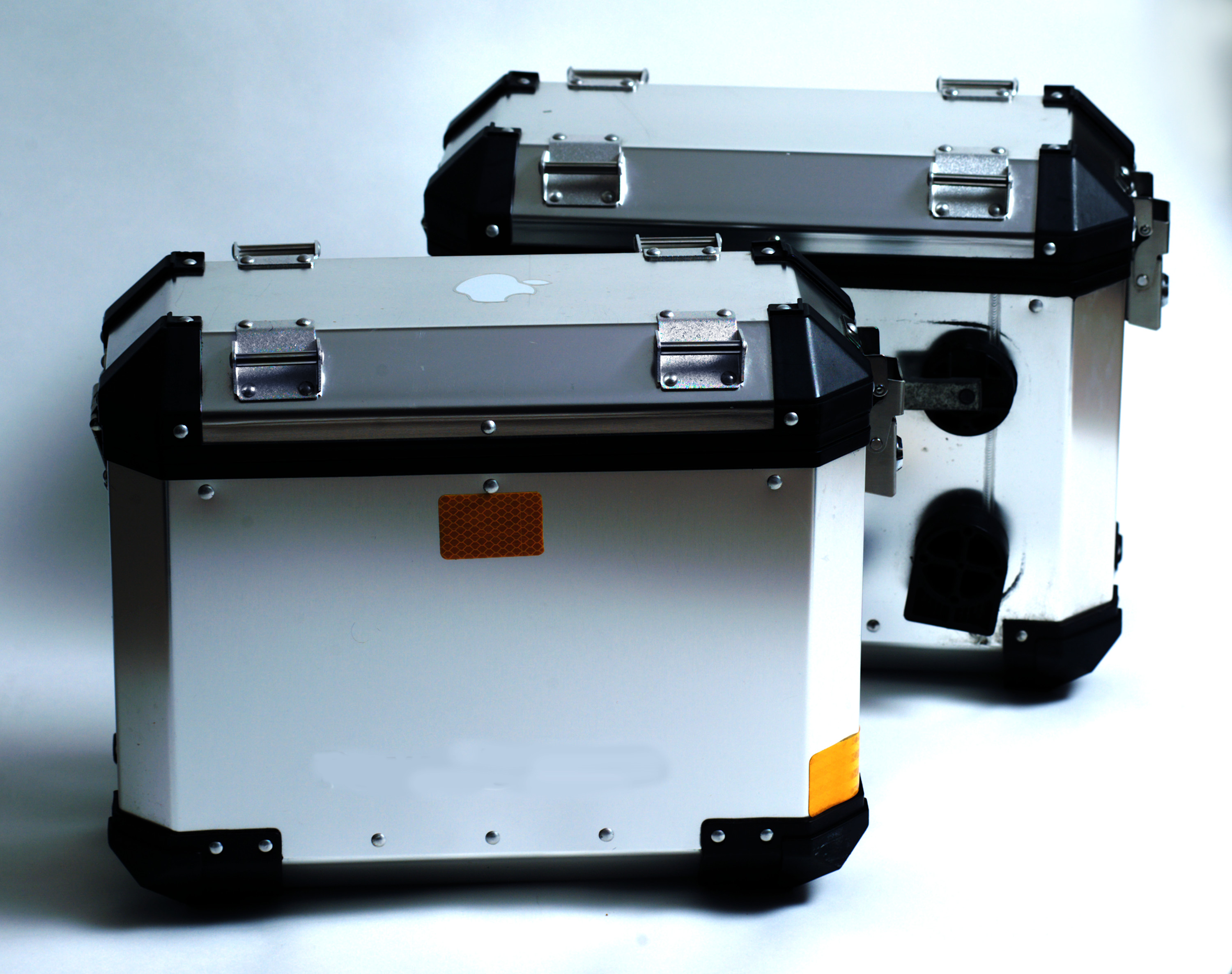
A pair of dismounted motorcycle panniers

== See also ==
- Outline of cycling
- Pannier (clothing)
- Saddlebag
- Pannier market
- Pannier tank
