= Low rider bicycle luggage carrier =

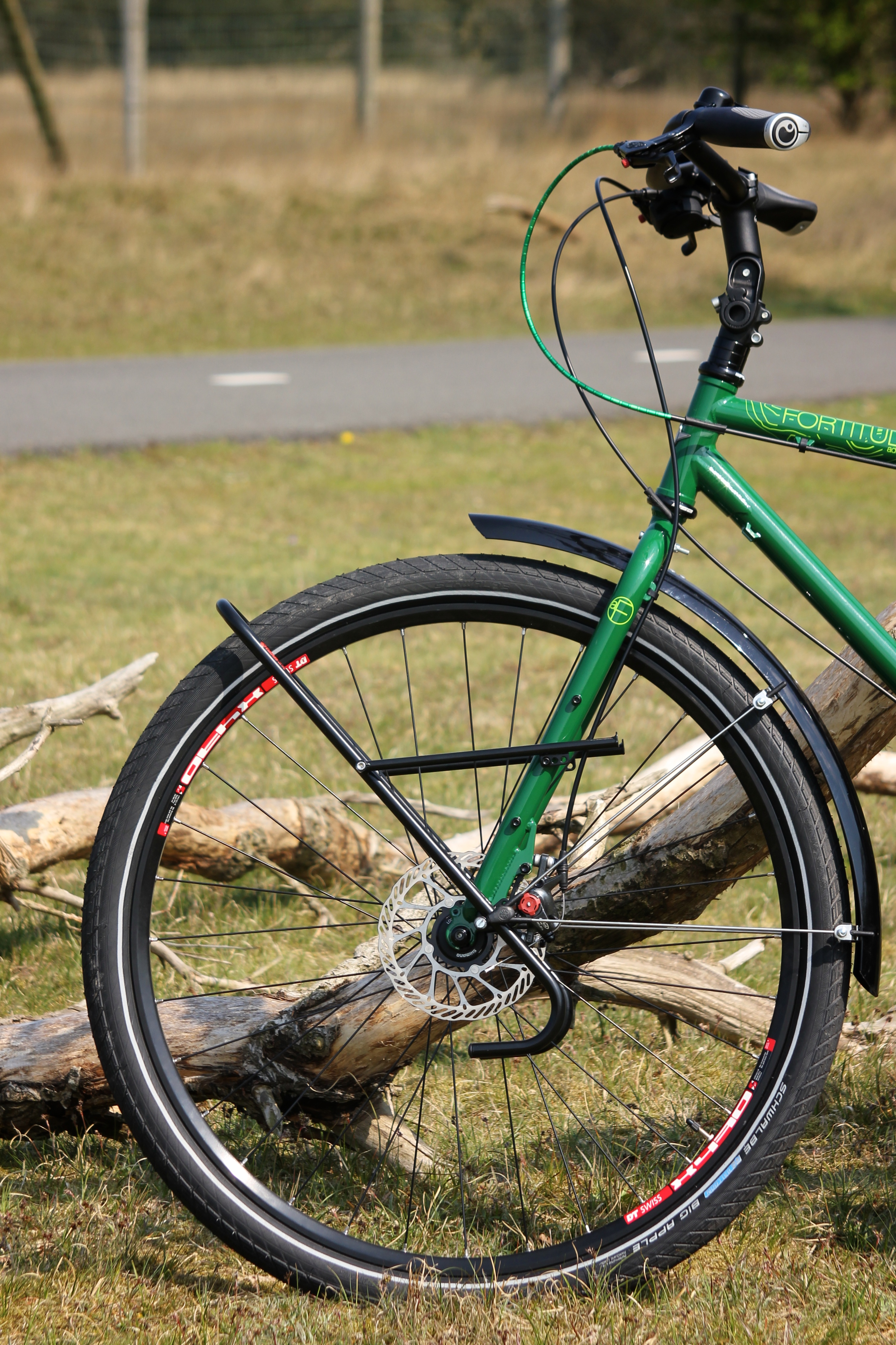
Tubus Tara low rider luggage carrier mounted on a green Genesis Fortitude Adventure bicycle.

A low rider is a type of luggage carrier for bicycles on which luggage can be carried with a low center of gravity. Low riders are most commonly used by cycling tourists who carry luggage in panniers on the front wheel.

For optimal balance the luggage on a front carrier should be placed low, and as closely as possible to the steering axis (in line with the head tube, a little behind the front wheel axis).

== Construction ==
Like other types of luggage carriers low riders are usually constructed out of aluminum or (stainless) steel rods or tubing. The rods and tubes bent to the right shape and then mounting points are added to it.

All low riders have horizontal rails on which panniers can be attached. The most common diameter of the rails is 10 millimeters. Some low riders have two rails on each side. The lower rail allows the luggage to be carried near the center of gravity of the wheel, while the higher rail provides more clearance from obstacles when cycling over rough terrain.

Low riders can be made out of two separate parts or joined together with a stabilizing bow, which increases the stiffness. Some low riders include a top platform on which more luggage can be packed.

== Installation ==
Low riders are specifically designed to be mounted on a specific kind of fork. Touring bicycles usually have a front fork with one or two threaded eyelets for M5 bolts on the front dropout on each side. These are for mounting fenders and/or luggage carrier. Another mid-fork eyelet "braze-on" is positioned 160 to 175 mm above it for mounting a low rider front luggage carrier. There is no established standard for the position of the mid-fork eyelet. Most low riders are adjustable to compensate for this. Some forks have mid-fork eyelets on the inside as well as outside to provide mounting of some specialized carriers such as the Tubus Duo. For bicycles that do not have these eyelets or "braze-ons", various alternatives exist. Some of these come in the form of "U-Bolts", clamps, or some sort of clamp-on eyelet (see Tubus Aluminum Alloy Fork Mounting Kit) When installing carriers, a drop of thread-locking fluid is advised to ensure that the screws do not loosen from vibrations under load.
