= Gravel bicycle =

Type of bicycle made for both road and off-road

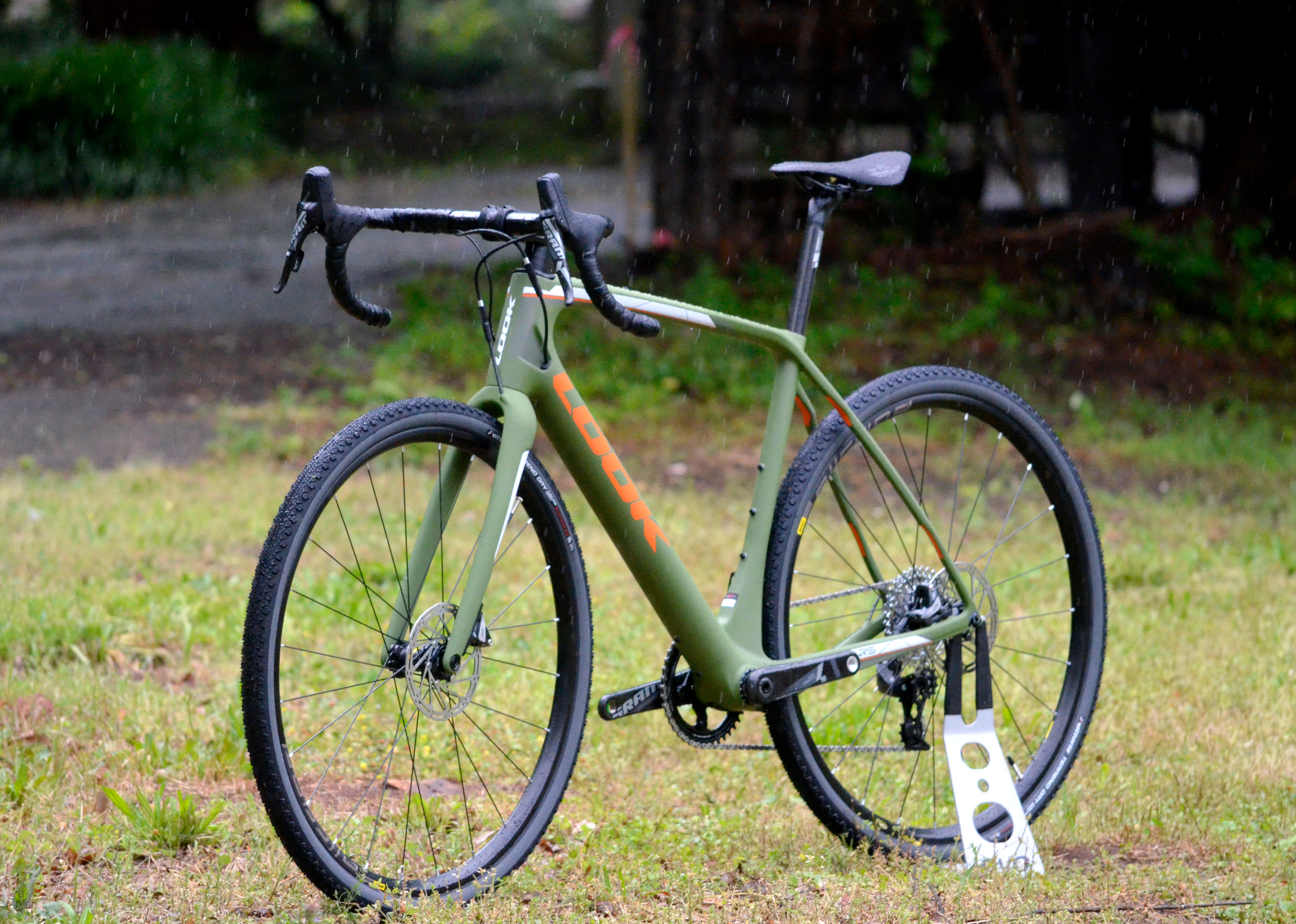
A Look 765 gravel bicycle, without rider, propped up on a photo stand.

A gravel bicycle is a type of bicycle intended for gravel cycling, including gravel racing. They are also sometimes known as "adventure bicycles", particularly ones intended for harsher off-road terrain.

While bicycles have been used for riding on such roads since bicycles were invented, the "modern" gravel bicycle, as a category, evolved in the 2000s, adopting technology from road bicycles, hybrid bicycles, cyclocross bicycles and mountain bikes. They also share many characteristics of touring bicycles, such as relaxed geometry, wide tyres and wide-range gearing.

== Design characteristics ==
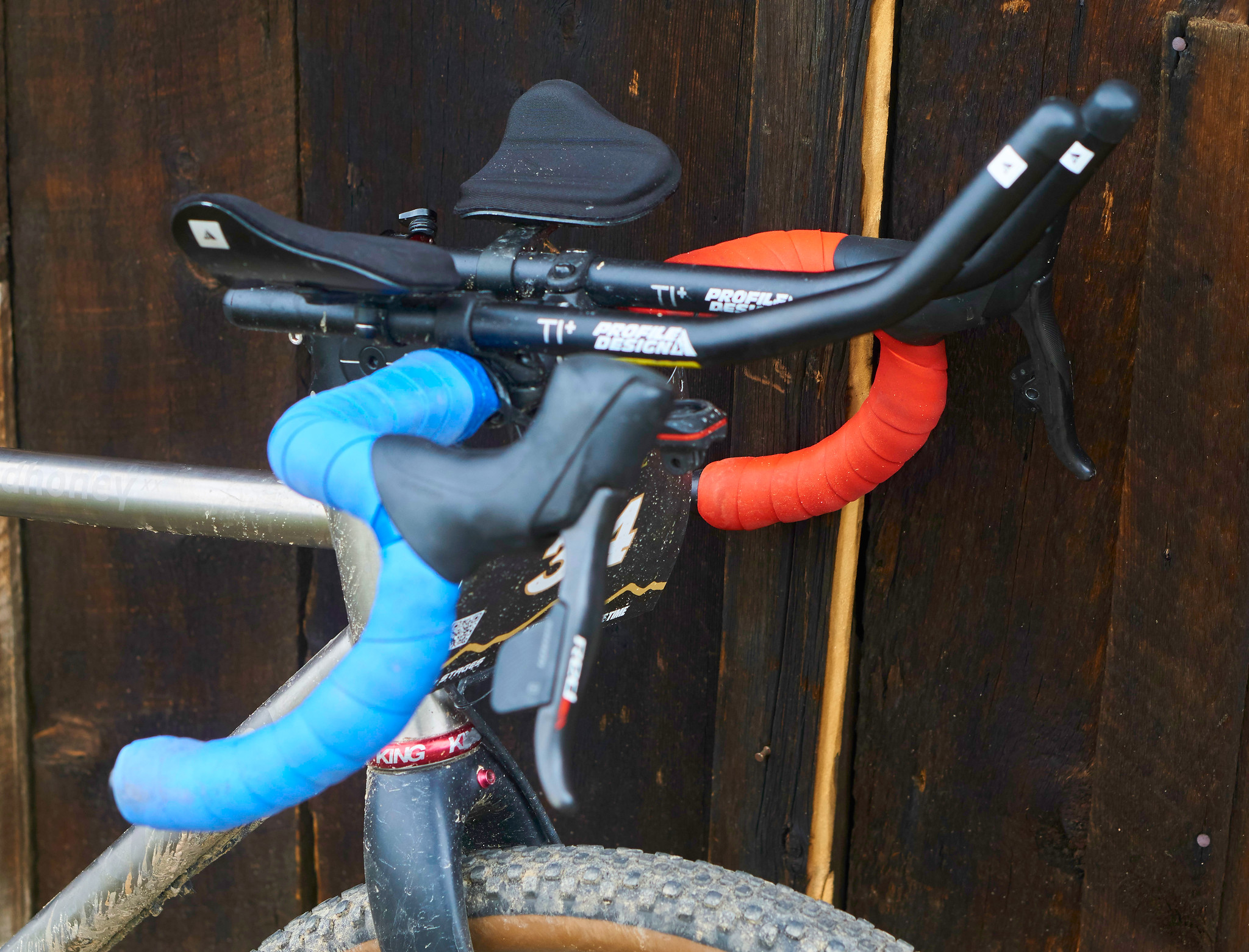
Clip-on aerobars fitted to a gravel bike for racing

Once assembled from cyclocross and road touring bikes, purpose-designed gravel bikes emerged in the 2010s as bicycle manufacturers saw a growing sales segment. Many companies, large and small, rapidly took to designing and marketing bikes specific to gravel. Races such as Unbound Gravel and riders such as Dan Hughes helped to shape the trend. By the end of the 2010s, gravel bikes were a significant portion of all bikes sold.

Gravel bikes have been constructed out of a wide variety of frame materials, including aluminum, carbon fibre, titanium and steel. The vast majority of gravel bikes include a rigid fork, carbon fibre and chromoly forks being the most common given its inherent vibration-absorbing properties.

Gravel bicycles generally use drop bars, similar to racing and cyclocross bicycles, unlike mountain bikes and hybrid bicycles. Many gravel bikes are fitted with wider bars than would be typical for a road or cyclocross bike, and a few have been fitted with "flared" bars that angle outwards. Clip-on aerobar extensions are sometimes used, particularly in racing.

Gravel bikes have frame geometry that is intermediate between a road bike and a cross-country mountain bike, leading to a bike that is slower to turn but more stable, particularly in low-traction descents, than a road bike or cyclocross bike.

Gravel bikes almost universally use disc brakes, and many models use hydraulic disc brakes.

Gravel bikes often have additional mounting points for bottle cages, as well as carriage points optimised for carrying bikepacking gear.

== Suspension ==
The majority of gravel bikes sold to date rely on the cushioning of their wider tyres, and controlled flexing in wheels, fork, and frame, to provide a cushioning effect. However, a few gravel bikes offer mechanical suspension in some form. Where offered, the suspension travel is typically limited to about 20–30 mm.

Examples of gravel bikes with suspension are the Lauf True Grit, which has a leaf spring fork for suspension as well as the Cannondale Topstone Carbon Lefty, which has a pivoting seat stay and flexible chainstays to provide increased suspension, and a single-sided hydraulically-suspended "lefty" fork. Both front and rear suspension offer around 30 mm of travel.

== Drivetrain ==
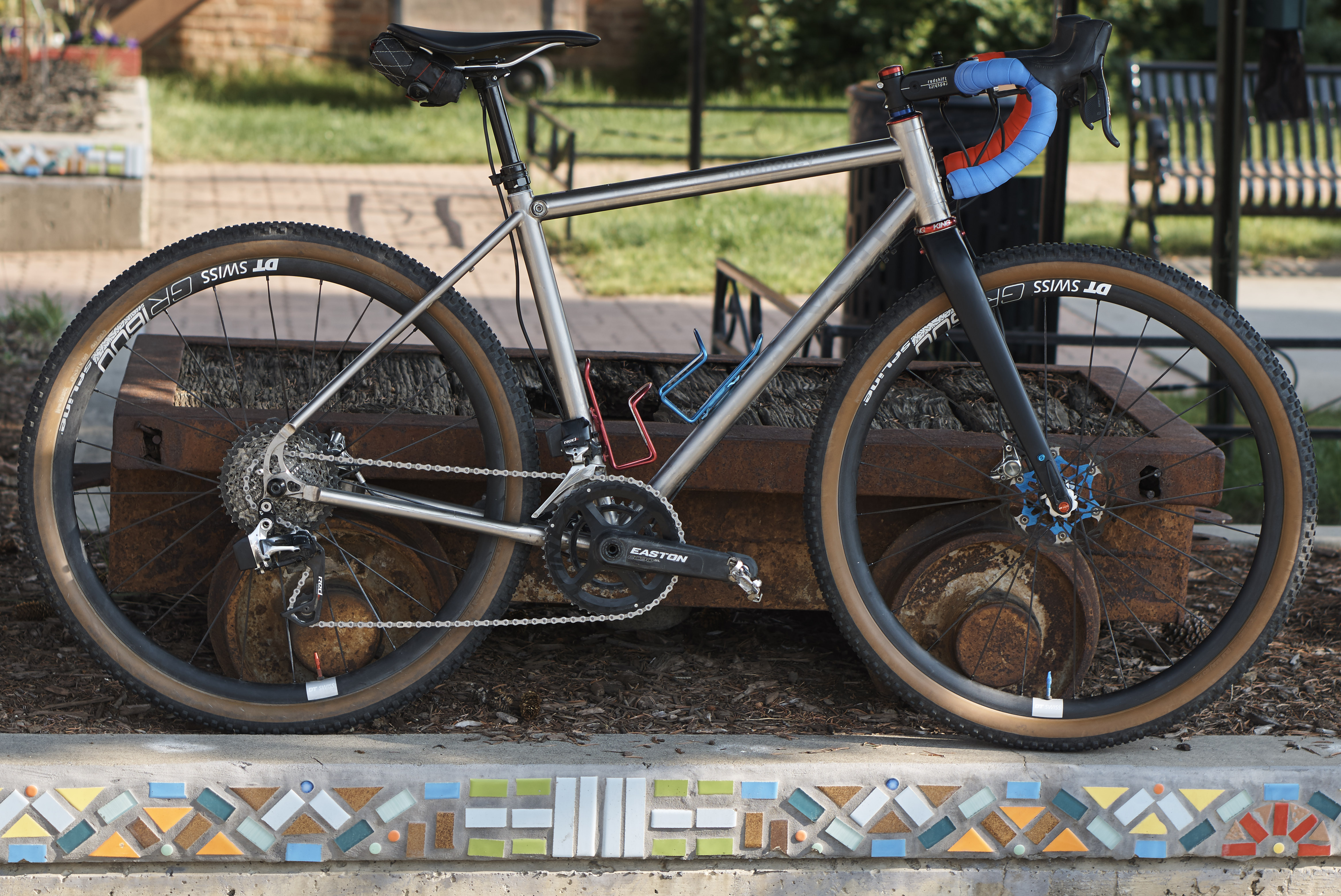
A gravel bicycle used for racing. It has a customised drivetrain with 46/30 chainrings and an 11–40 cassette, giving a very wide spread of gears. It has 650b wheels with 48 mm wide tyres

The drivetrains for gravel bikes are mostly supplied by the three major groupset manufacturers, Shimano, SRAM, and Campagnolo, and, like other aspects of gravel bikes, offer a blend of characteristics from road and mountain bicycles.

Unlike touring bicycles, where bar-end shifters remain quite commonly used, most gravel bicycles use integrated brake levers and shifting ("brifters") either identical to, or very similar to, modern racing bicycles. Electronic shifting is very common on high-end gravel bicycles.

Shimano and Campagnolo have branded families of dedicated gravel components, namely Shimano GRX and Campagnolo Ekar. SRAM recently developed its own XPLR collection adding gravel-specific features in some of their RED, Force and Rival groupsets, as a complement of using their mix of AXS for electronic mountain bike and road bike ranges.

Unlike on road bikes, where "2x" drivetrains with two chainrings are ubiquitous, and unlike mountain bikes where "1x" drivetrains with a single chainring are standard on new bikes, both 1x and 2x drivetrain options are widely available for gravel bikes. Cheap gravel-style bike models are often equipped with three front gears and seven rear gears.

While chosen gearing depends on terrain and rider preference, it is typical for gravel bikes to offer slightly lower gearing than road bicycles.

== Wheels ==
Gravel bike wheels are very similar to tubeless wheels used on some road and cyclocross bikes, and, indeed, 700c gravel wheelsets are often interchangeable with road and cyclocross wheelsets. 650b wheels used for gravel bikes are often derived from mountain bike wheels.

Cheaper gravel wheels usually have aluminium rims; carbon fibre is used for more expensive wheel sets. Aerodynamic shaping is used on some wheelsets to reduce drag, as on road bikes.

The main distinguishing features from tubeless road bike wheels are slightly more robust construction, and wider rim widths.

== Pedals ==
Gravel bikes can be fitted with clipless pedals that use the Shimano SPD or compatible cleat system, ubiquitous on mountain and cyclocross bikes.

== Tyres ==
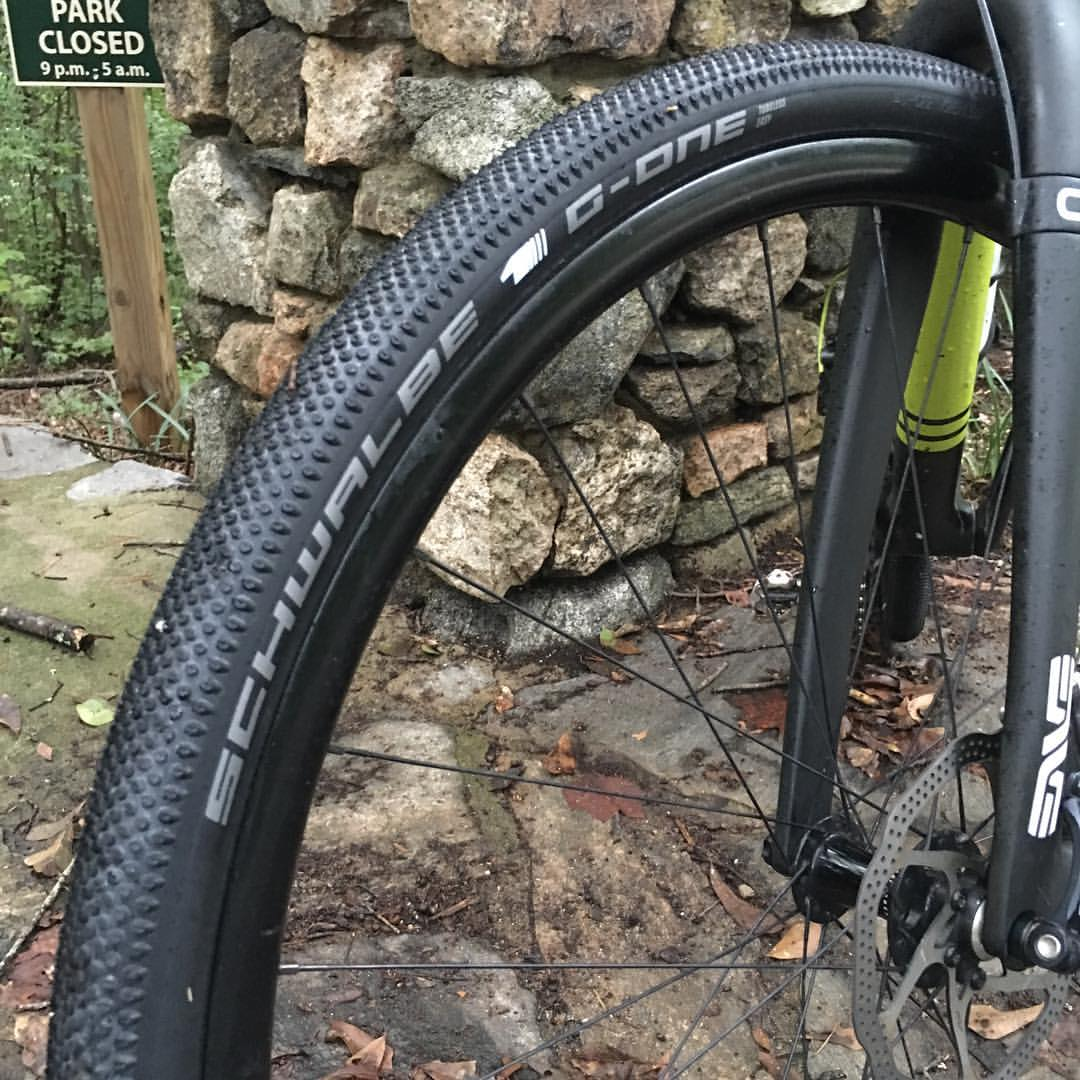
A Schwalbe G-One tubeless bicycle tyre, in use on an unidentified gravel bike

Gravel bikes are able to fit a wide range of tyres, from tyres used on road racing bicycles to the narrower end of mountain bike tyres.

Unlike cyclocross bikes, which are designed exclusively for 700c wheels and a maximum tyre width of around 33 mm (still wider than a typical racing bike tyre of 28 mm), gravel bikes are designed to fit much wider 700c tyres, often around 40 mm but sometimes up to 45–50 mm. Mountain bikes run wider tyres still. Some gravel bikes are fitted with 650b wheels, whose smaller diameter allows wider tyres to be fitted to a similarly configured frame. Like mountain bikes, the vast majority of high-end gravel bikes use tubeless tyres, as they are less susceptible to punctures and pinch flats than clincher tyres. Lower end models are often equipped with "tubeless-ready" rims and tyres but delivered with traditional inner tubes.

Tyre choice is a major point of debate in gravel racing, with riders trading off speed on sealed and high-quality dirt roads, weight, and puncture resistance and traction in dustier, sandier or muddier conditions.
