= Ortlieb Sportartikel =

German manufacturer of waterproof bicycle bags

Ortlieb Sportartikel GmbH

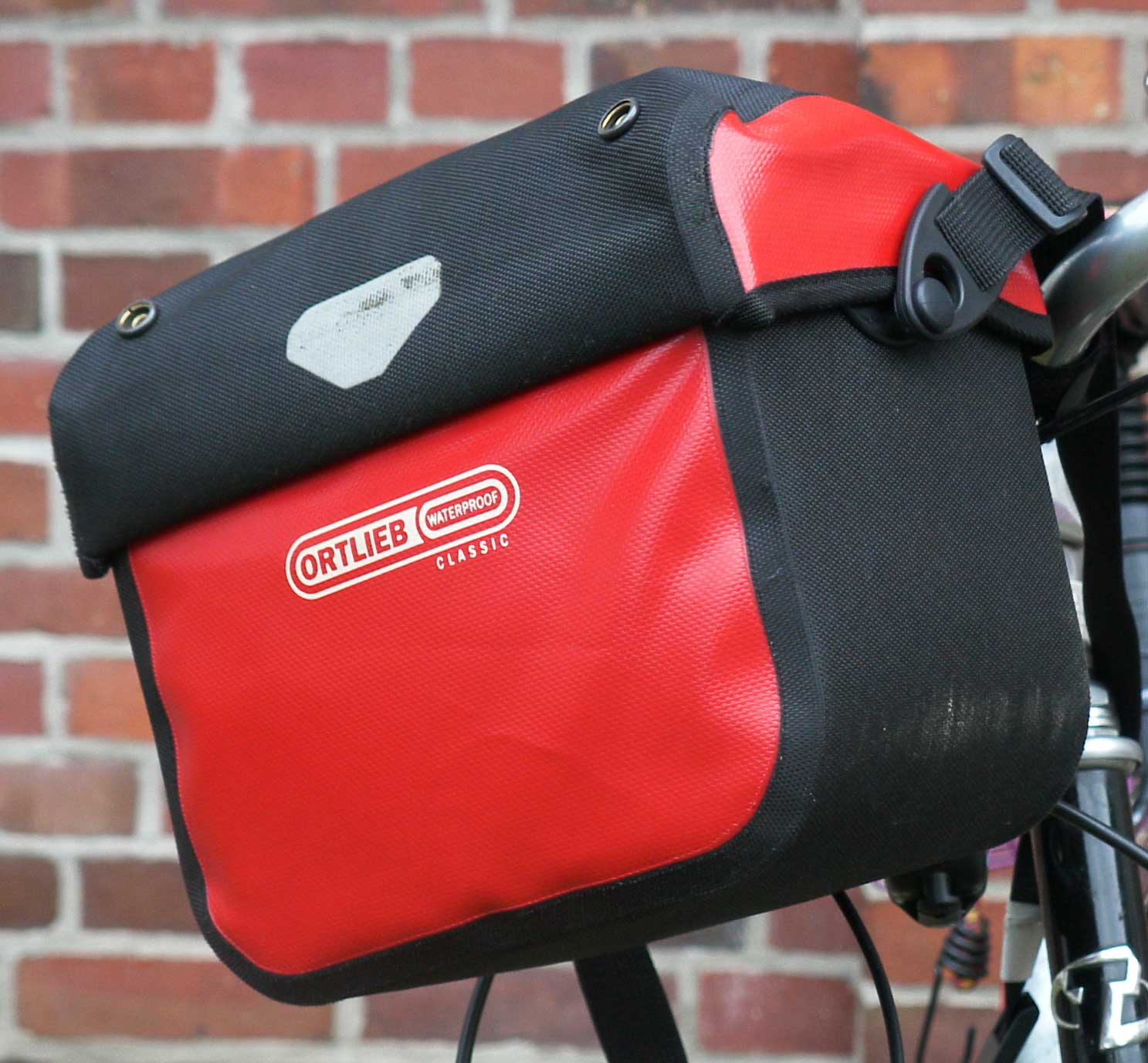
- Handlebar bag from Ortlieb
- Industry: Pannier maker
- Founded: 1982
- Founder: Hartmut Ortlieb, Jürgen Siegwarth
- Headquarters: Heilsbronn, Germany
- Key people: Martin Esslinger (CEO)
- Products: sports articles
- Number of employees: 189 (2016)
- Website: www.ortlieb.com

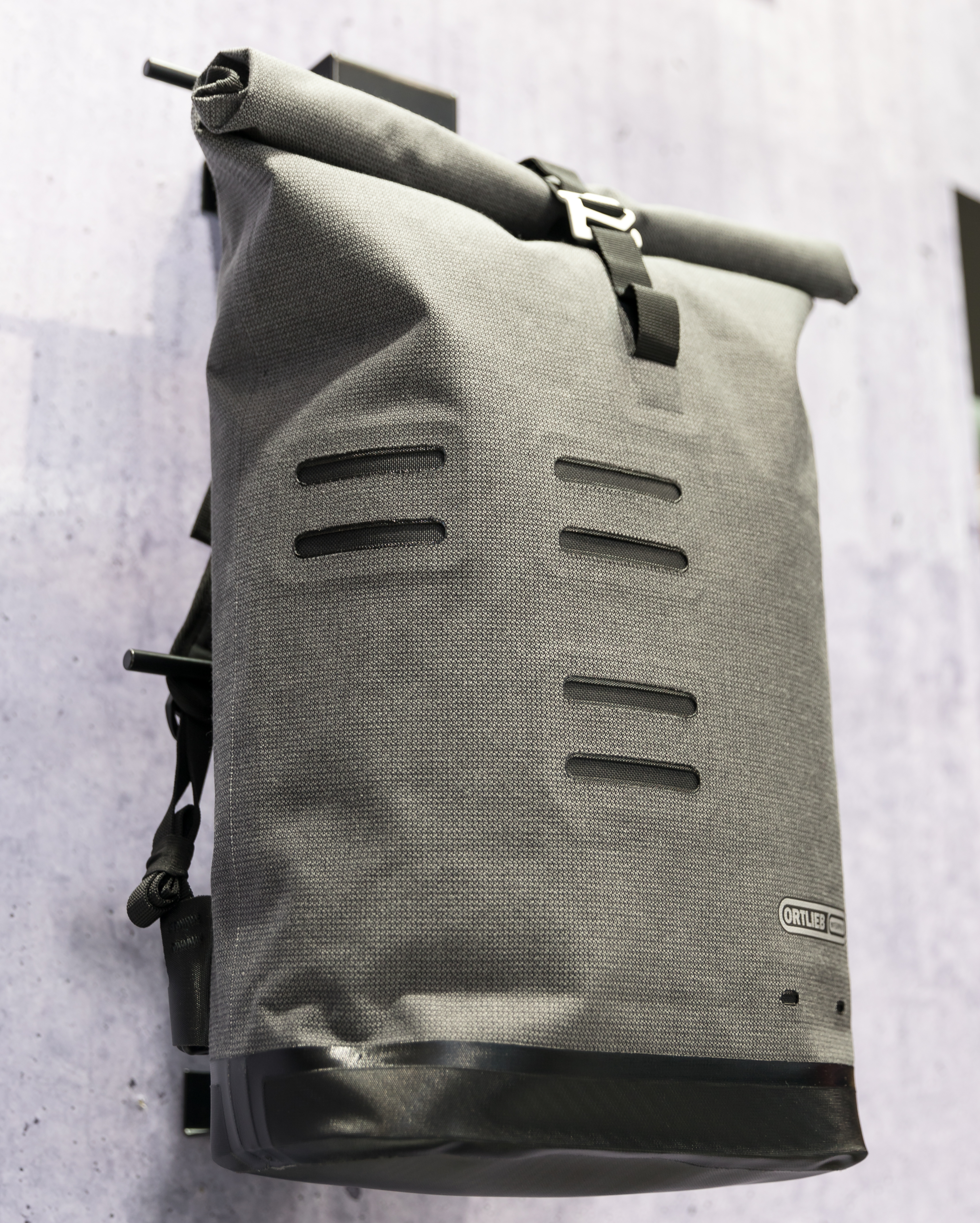
Backpack with roll closure

Ortlieb Sportartikel GmbH is a German manufacturer of outdoor equipment based in Heilsbronn, Germany, which specializes in waterproof bags. Ortlieb is a leading manufacturer of waterproof panniers for bicycles.

In addition to bicycle accessories, Ortlieb also produces outdoor, trekking and expedition equipment for water sports and motorcycles. Special shoulder bags and backpacks are offered for bicycle messengers.

== History ==
The company was founded in 1982 by Hartmut Ortlieb in Nuremberg, Germany. In 1997 the head office was moved to Heilsbronn in Middle Franconia, 25 km away.

The first products were hand-sewn panniers made from truck tarpaulins. Waterproof bags for bicycles did not exist until then.

The company makes more than 500 products and uses various different waterproof closure systems (zipper, hook-and-loop fastener and their typical roll closures). All products are guaranteed for five years and the seams of the goods are welded watertight.

In 2022, Ortlieb introduced a repair service to its products in order to reduce consumerism. During holiday season in 2023, Ortlieb started "repair weeks" – a 40% discount off repair costs for all products out of the 5-year warranty period.

== Partnerships and sponsorships ==
Ortlieb actively supports a large variety of biking projects and environmental protection initiatives. It partners with ADFC, Verkehrsclub Deutschland and Allgemeine Ortskrankenkasse to promote and popularize biking in Germany. Ortlieb supports a number of nature conservation and environmental protection initiatives and organisations. It also sponsors cycling events and athletes, most notably BikingMan and Jonas Deichmann.
