= Bilenky Cycle Works =

American handmade bicycle manufacturer

- Industry: Manufacturing
- Founded: 1983
- Founder: Stephen Bilenky
- Headquarters: Philadelphia, Pennsylvania, United States
- Products: Bicyles

Bilenky Cycle Works is an American handmade bicycle manufacturer located in Philadelphia, Pennsylvania.

== Information ==
Founded by Stephen Bilenky, a member of the musical group The Notekillers, in 1983, BCW fabricates both frames and complete bicycles, ranging from TIG welded track bikes to intricately lugged tandems. BCW has been featured in many bicycle publications, art shows, and is a frequent winner of national awards. Most Bilenky frames are steel although titanium is being used with more frequency. Bilenky has installed tens of thousands of S & S couplers, both in their own bikes and other brands.

Bilenky Cycle Works is located at 5319 N. 2nd St. Philadelphia, PA 19120. Bilenky sponsors the Junkyard Cyclocross Race and co-sponsors the Philly Bike Expo. In 2021, Bilenky was commissioned by the United States government to manufacture a custom-built bicycle as a diplomatic gift presented to UK Prime Minister Boris Johnson at the 47th G7 summit.

== Models ==
- Ultralite Classic Road - Road bike
- Tourlite Sport - a sport touring/randonneuring bike.
- Midlands Touring - a long wheelbase touring bike with low bracket.
- Hedgehog - mountain bike
- MetroLuxe - city bike/commuter bike
- Tandems - Tandem bike
- Chuckwagon - cargo bike
- Viewpoint - a proprietary semi-recumbent tandem with independent stoker pedaling.
- Nor'easter - a cyclo-cross bicycle
- Track - a track bike

=== Model Levels ===
All models come in the following versions:

- Deluxe Series - tig welded construction, custom materials, braze-ons, and color results in a bike built just for the rider.
- Signature - offers hand finished, fillet brazing, or silver brazed hand-detailed lugs.
- Artisan - one-of-a-kind metal work that distinguishes each frame as a unique creation with specifications as determined by the riders' measurements, style, and intended use.
