= Órbita bicycles =

Portuguese bicycle manufacturer

Órbita – Bicicletas Portuguesas, Lda.
- Traded as: Órbita
- Founded: 1971
- Headquarters: Águeda, Portugal
- Area served: Worldwide
- Products: Bicycles
- Parent: Miralago, S.A.
- Website: www.orbitabikes.com

Órbita – Bicycletas Portuguesas, Lda. was an international bicycle manufacturer headquartered in Águeda, Portugal. The bicycles produced were branded as Órbita or Orbita (in some countries).

The company was created on 2 February 1971 and 95% of its shares are owned by the Miralago S.A group.

Órbita manufactured a wide range of bicycle types including utility, mountain, racing, touring, hybrid, cruiser and BMX bikes. These included specific models for women, for men, for children, vintage bikes, two rider bikes, tricycles and folding bikes.

70% of Órbita's production was exported and the rest was destined for the Portuguese market. Órbita bikes are presently sold in several countries of Europe, Africa and North America.

Órbita closed in 2020 do to bankruptcy related to financial issues related to the COVID-19 pandemic.

== Models presently in production ==
Órbita bike models in production
Mountain	City	Vintage	Fixie	Folding	Tandem	Tricycles	Road	Corporate	Free style	Electric	Kids
XTR 29"	Estoril II (woman)	Classic	Fixie Cr. Mo.	Articulada	Double Force	Tricycle Tipper	Ultegra	Urban	FreeStyle	Scorbita Super 3	Shark
XTR 27,5"	Trekking	Classic (woman)	Fixie ST-37	Eurobici	Cruiser	Triciclo Large	105	Post Distribution		Scorbita Folding 20	BTT 20"
XTR 26" Dual suspension	Trekking (woman)	Impala			Dupla Sport	Scorbita Electric Tricycle	OP 220	GNR		Scorbita Electric Tricycle	BTT 20" (girls)
RS-5	Super City				Sintra	Scorbita Large Electric Tricycle	ER-003			Scorbita Large Electric Tricycle	Y20
Destructor	Estoril III										Pop16
XT 29"	Country Tour										Pop14
XT 26" Dual suspension	Dame Blanche										M400
XTR 26"	Strada										Kitty
XT 26"	City 242										Cross
Kreyts 29er	Búfalo										
Kreyts 27,5"											
Kreyts											
Kripton											
Boxxer											
Europa											
Europa (woman)											
Sprintline											
Sprintline (woman)											
Warrior 26"											
Warrior 26" (woman)											
Alfa 26"											
Alfa 26" (woman)											
Europa 24"											
Warrior 24"											
Warrior 24" (woman)											
Y24											
Alfa 24"											
Alfa 24" (woman)											
