= Bicycle torque coupling =

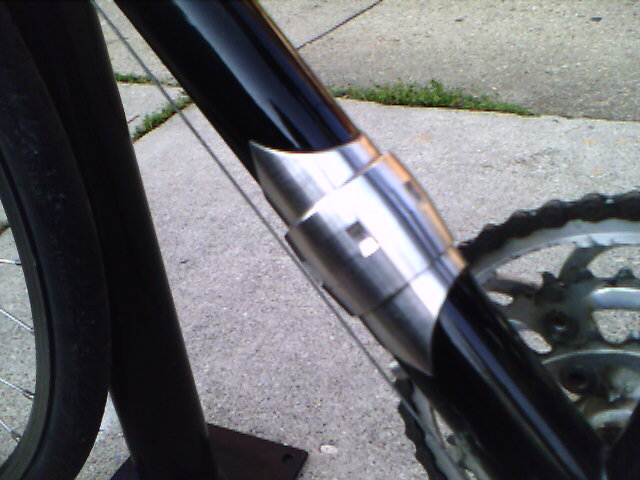
A BTC in the down tube of a touring bicycle

An S and S coupling equipped Burley packed in its cases

An S and S coupling also known as a bicycle torque coupling (BTC) is a coupling which enables bicycle frames to be separated into smaller pieces, usually to facilitate packing and transporting. Couplings can be built into the frame by the frame manufacturer when the frame is made or can be added to a frame after it is finished. A special spanner is available for tightening and loosening the couplings.

== Applications ==
The couplings are usually installed in the top tube and down tube of a single-rider diamond frame. This enables the bicycle to be boxed small enough to avoid the extra fee most airlines charge to check a bicycle as luggage. They can also be installed in tandem and recumbent frames. Santana manufactures a "triplet (or quad) that can be transformed into a tandem by simply removing the center section of the frame." R+E cycles has a similar design allowing the same bike to accommodate 1-5 riders via adding or removing sections.

== Characteristics ==
The couplings are available in stainless steel, cromoly steel, and titanium and in different sizes, from 5/8 to 2 inches (16 to 51 mm) to match the frame tubing in which they are installed. They weigh about 8 oz (230 g) per pair, and are as strong as uncoupled tubing. They use a Hirth joint to resist torsion.

It takes a few minutes to separate the couplings.

== Alternatives ==
In order to support the ovalized tube Santana Cycles uses between the bottom bracket shells of their tandems, they have developed their own oval couplers.

== See also ==
- Folding bicycle
- Recumbent bicycle
- Tandem bicycle
- Touring bicycle
