= Grivel (car) =

1890s French automobile manufacturer

Grivel was a French automobile manufacturer based in Neuilly-sur-Seine. Production started in 1896 and ended in 1897.

== Vehicles ==
In 1896 a Grivel Tricycle-Tandem took part in the Paris-Marseille race, but suffered an accident. The vehicle was powered by an air-cooled, horizontal two-cylinder petrol engine that produced 2 HP.

In 1897 a Quadricycle with rear engine was available. It featured a tubular frame and the same 2 HP engine as in the Tricycle-Tandem. The driving power was transmitted directly to the rear axle by a gearbox. The total weight was 180 kg.

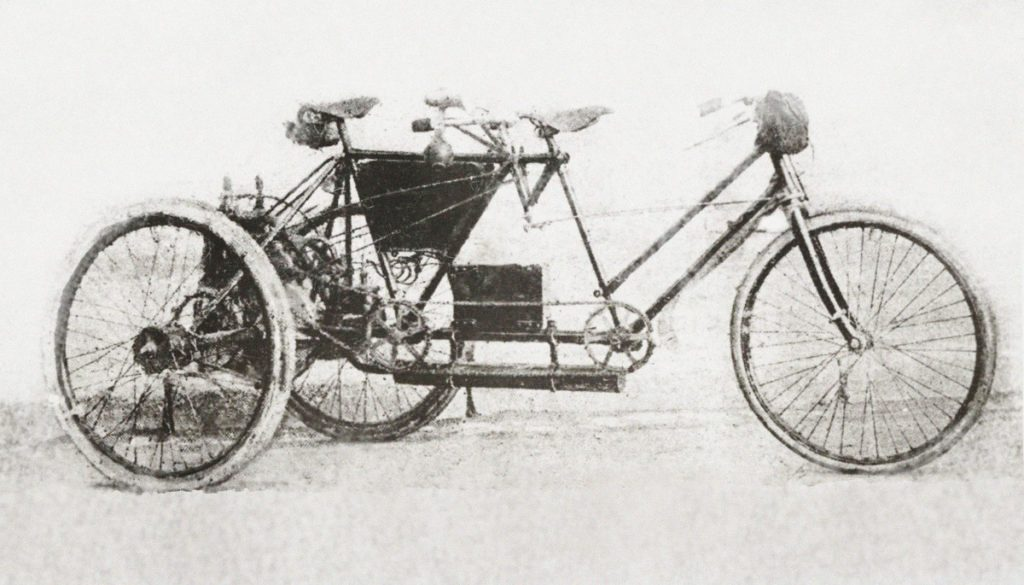
Grivel Tricycle-Tandem 2 HP (1896)

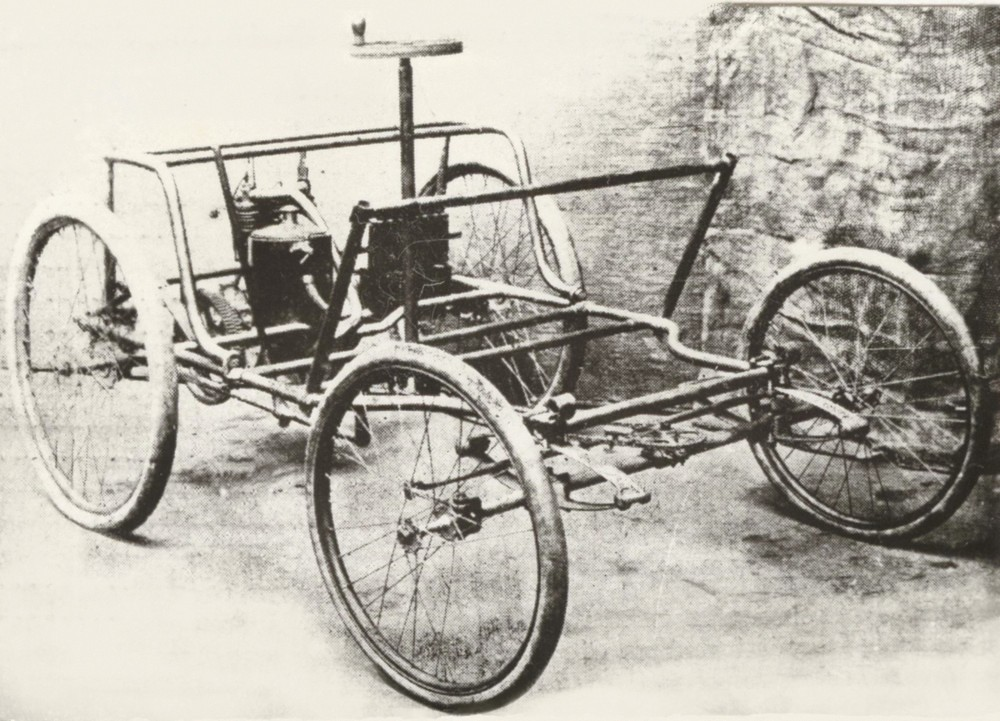
Grivel Quadricycle 2 HP (1897)

== See also ==
- Astresse

== Literature ==
David Burgess Wise, The New Illustrated Encyclopedia of Automobiles.
