= Fløng =

Town on Zealand, Denmark

Coordinates: 55°40′N 12°11′E

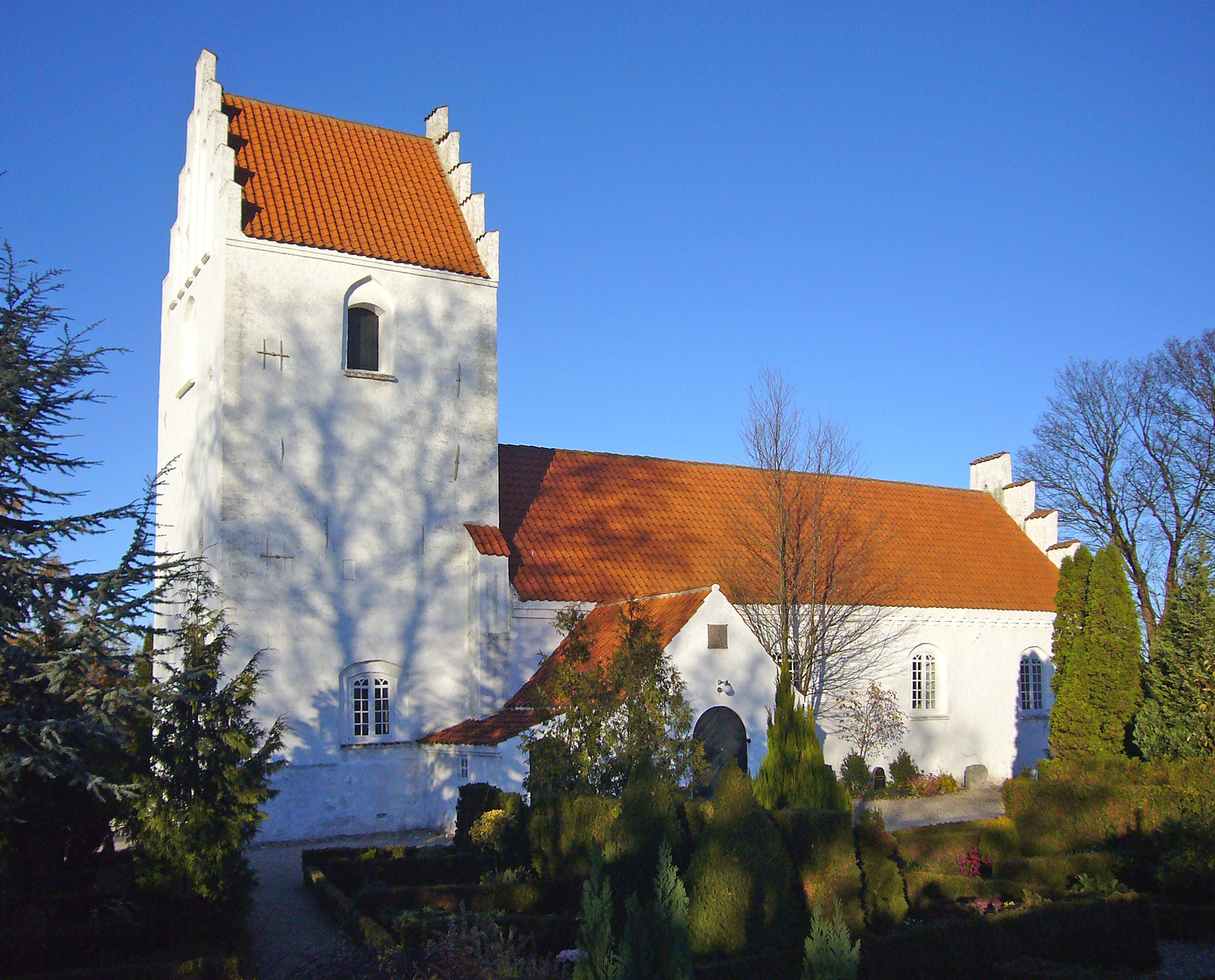
Church in Fløng

Fløng is a small town in Denmark located on Zealand, situated between Copenhagen and Roskilde. The city has approximately 4,000 inhabitants.

== Notable people ==
- Mikael Pedersen (1855 in Fløng - 1929) a Danish inventor of the Pedersen bicycle, also associated with the English town of Dursley
