= The Tandem Club =

The Tandem Club is a British cycling club for riders of tandem bicycles and tandem tricycles. Club members sometimes ride triplets and occasionally quads.

The club was formed in 1971 to provide hard-to-get spare parts and to give advice on safety and maintenance. Today it is an club with around 3000 members in many parts of the world. Rallies are held in several countries, and include social events, visits to places of special interest and probably most importantly, tandem rides. These range from short family outings to a local play area to rides of 80 miles or more in an area with challenging terrain. There are more than 40 regional officers in the UK alone who organise local events such as rides and local rallies. The Tandem Club also encourages using tandems as a safe and efficient mode of transport, especially for children and the disabled.

The club is affiliated to Cycling UK.

== See also ==
- Cyclists' Touring Club
