= Astresse =

1898 French automobile

The Astresse was a French automobile manufactured only in 1898. The company, based in Levallois-Perret, claimed to build some two or three cars a month, using engines built under Grivel license.

== See also ==
- Grivel (car)
