= Touring bicycle =

Bicycle designed or modified for touring

A touring bicycle with flat bars and 660 mm (26 in) wheels

A touring bicycle is a bicycle designed or modified to handle bicycle touring. To make the bikes sufficiently robust, comfortable and capable of carrying heavy loads, special features may include a long wheelbase (for ride comfort and to avoid pedal-to-luggage conflicts), frame materials that favor flexibility over rigidity (for ride comfort—though frame flexing can eventually lead to metal fatigue and frame failure, so newer frames are rigid), heavy duty wheels (for load capacity), and multiple mounting points (for luggage racks, fenders, and bottle cages).

== Types ==
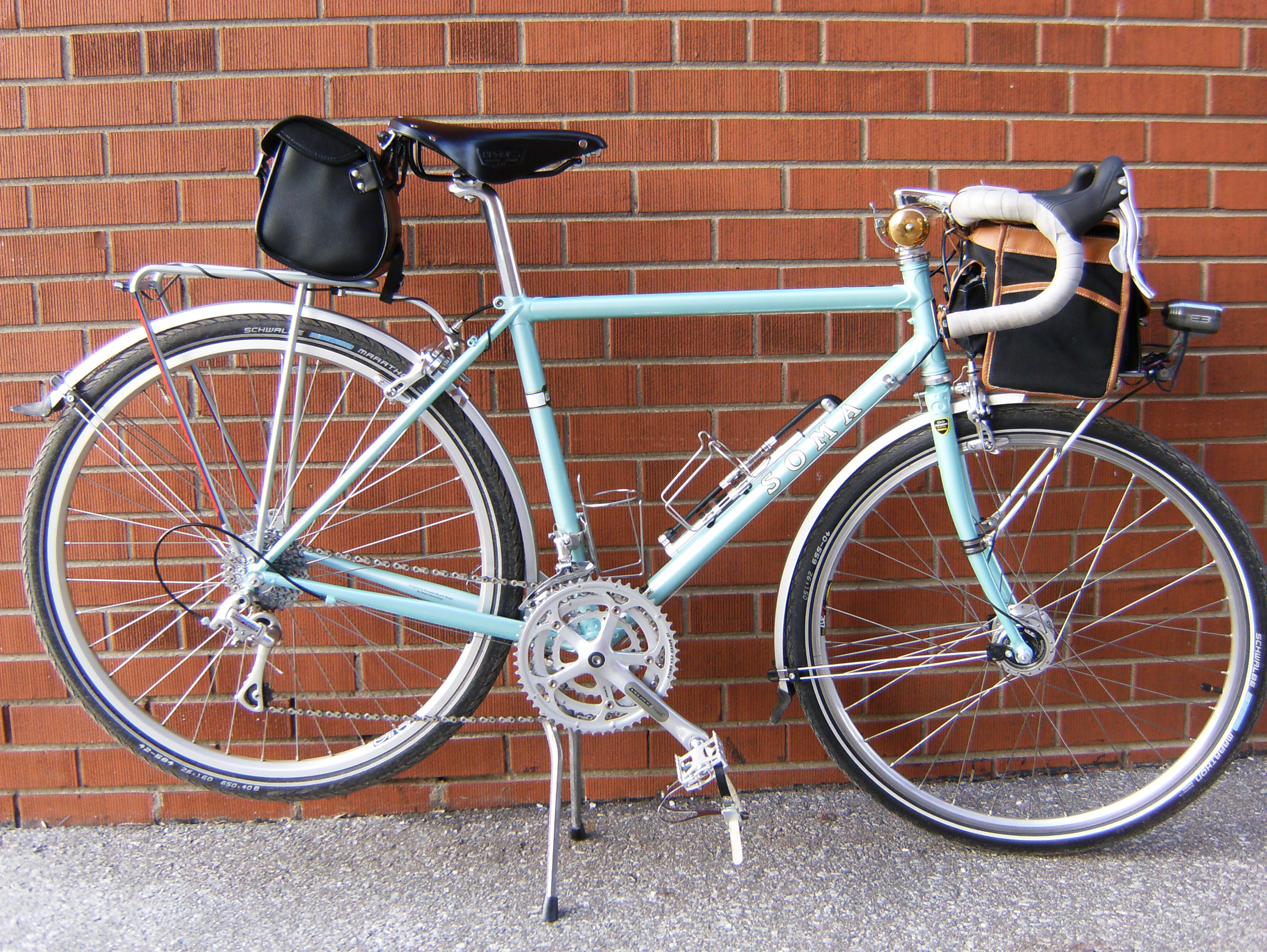
A light touring bicycle

Touring bicycle configurations are highly variable and may include road, sport touring, trail, recumbent, or tandem configurations.

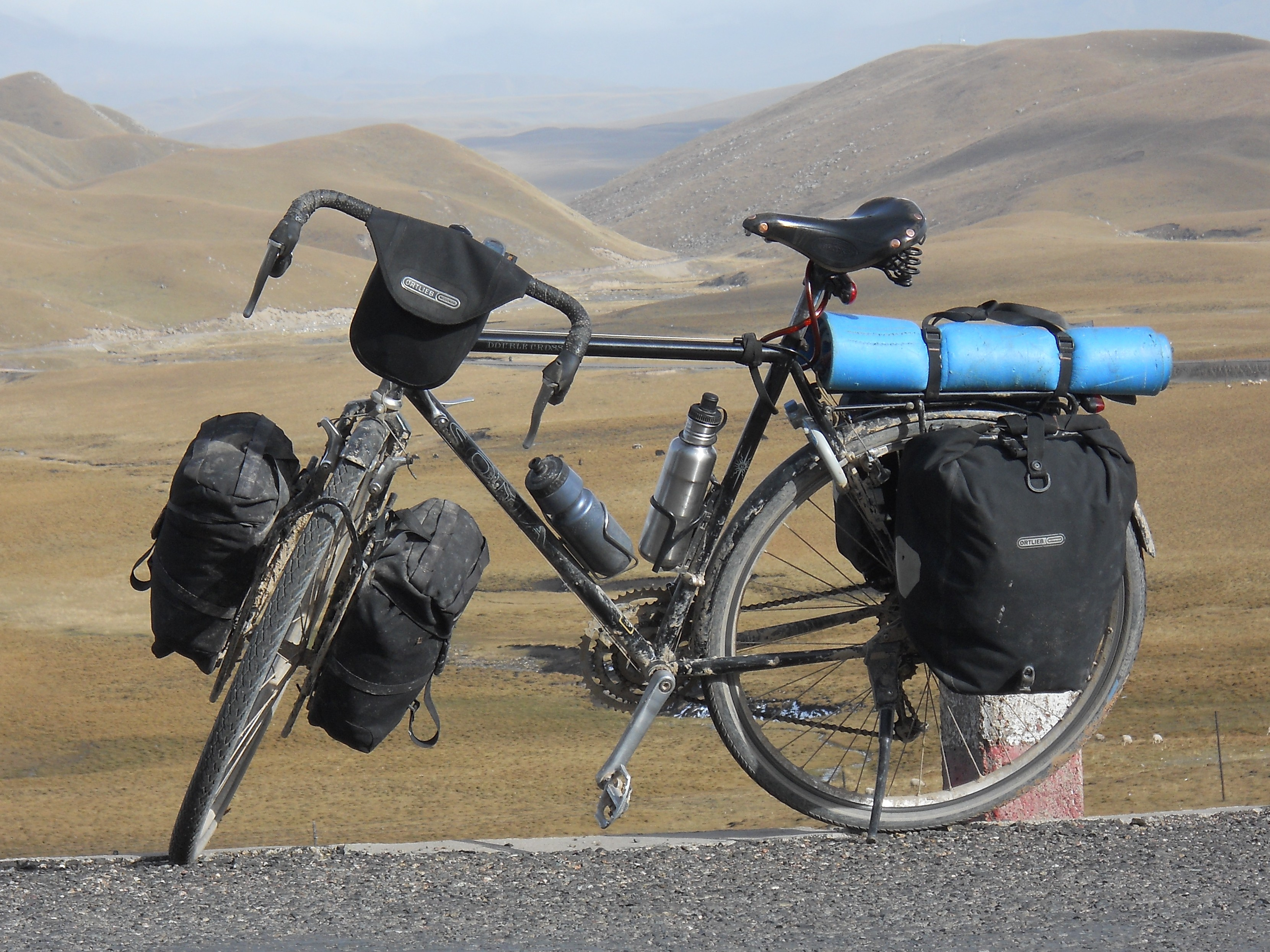
A touring bicycle with drop bars and 700C (622 mm) wheels

=== Road touring ===
Road touring bicycles have a frame geometry designed to provide a comfortable ride and stable, predictable handling when laden with baggage, provisions for the attachment of fenders and mounting points for carrier racks and panniers.

Modern road tourers may employ 700C (622 mm) wheels — the same diameter as a road (racing) bicycle. Other road touring bikes may feature wider rims and more clearance in the frame for wider bicycle tires. Before the 1980s, many touring bikes were built with 630 mm (27-inch) wheels which have a slightly larger diameter.

Other touring bikes use 660 mm (26-inch) wheels for both off-road and on-road use. Advantages of the slightly smaller wheel include additional strength, worldwide tire availability, and lighter weight. Some touring bicycles, such as the Rivendell Atlantis and Surly Long Haul Trucker, offer frames designed for 660 mm (26-inch, ISO 559) wheels or for 700C (622 mm) wheels, with the frame geometry optimal for the selected wheel size.

Specially made touring tires for 660 mm (26-inch) wheels are now widely available, especially in developing countries, where 700C (622 mm) may be difficult to obtain. Hence, on the mass ride from Paris to the Beijing Olympics in 2008, the Fédération Française de Cyclotourisme asked all riders to use 660 mm (26-inch) wheels. Factors that affect rolling resistance include tire air pressure, tread and tire width as well as wheel size.

=== Sport touring ===
The sport/touring bicycle is a very lightweight touring bike fitted with lighter wheels and narrower 25–28 mm tires. It may also be described as a road racing bike fitted with heavier tires and slightly more relaxed frame geometry (though still quicker than the average road touring bike). It is designed as a fast-handling, responsive and quick day touring machine. As such, it is intended to carry only the rider and very light loads, such as encountered in credit card touring, where riders typically carry little more than a pocketbook and credit cards to book overnight lodging at any handy hotel, hostel, or bed-and-breakfast while on a journey.

Gearing is often a mix of closely spaced ratios for speed, combined with a few low gears for long climbs. Sport/touring bikes may sometimes have provisions for mounting slim fenders and a rear carrier or pannier rack, though in the interests of weight savings and quicker handling, most do not.

=== Expedition touring ===
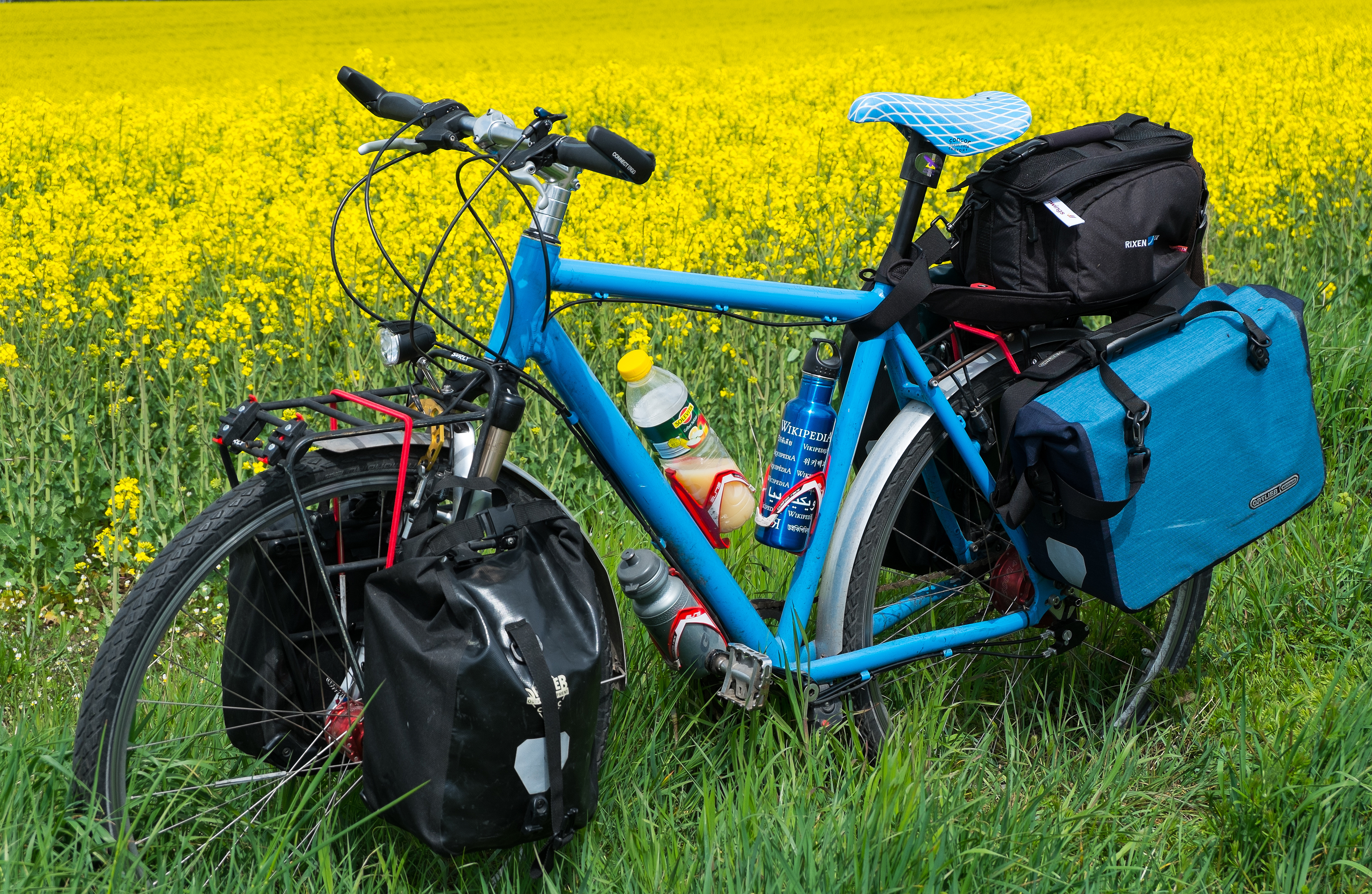
Touring bicycle

There are numerous variants on the traditional road tourer depending on the weight carried and the type of terrain expected. Expedition tourers are strongly built bicycles designed for carrying heavy loads over the roughest roads in remote and far-flung places. These range from simply stronger built mountain bikes, equipped with racks, panniers, mudguards and heavy-duty tires, to purpose-built bicycles built to cope with long-haul touring on tracks and unsealed roads in developing countries. Their frames are often made of steel as it is stronger, more flexible- therefore more comfortable over rough surfaces- and any breakages can be repaired virtually anywhere in the world.

A typical expedition touring bike would be made of relatively heavy duty steel tubing, with 660 mm (26 in) wheels, and componentry chosen for robustness and ease of maintenance. The main design criteria for such a bike would be to allow all-day comfort on the bike, have good handling characteristics under heavy load, and be capable of running smoothly on good roads, but also on the roughest of tracks. Some bike tourers have made their own expedition bikes, by building up on mountain bike frames. The key difference between a mountain bike and an expedition touring bike would be the addition of racks for panniers, and tougher, all purpose tires. They will have a longer wheelbase to allow for more comfortable cruising, at the expense of the manoeuvrability of a mountain bike. Most tourers also prefer heavier, stronger wheels than would be normal on a production mountain bike and although some are now equipped with disc brakes to eliminate natural rim side-wall wear. Most expedition bikes will have the same range of gears as a mountain bike and for durability some use the Rohloff Speedhub at the expense of its high cost.

It is a small, specialist market, so only a small number of bikes are sold under this description, few if any by the biggest manufacturers. Examples are the EXP and Raven from Thorn Cycles, and the Roberts Roughstuff, all made in the UK. Koga-Miyata produce the Signature range of bikes that allows users to specify many aspects of the bikes components to ultimately achieve an expedition bike.

=== Mixed terrain touring ===
Mixed terrain cycle touring bikes are a cross between mountain and road bikes. Also called all-rounders, 29er touring or monster cross, these bikes strive for a balance of efficiency and speed on and off-road. Typically they are built with light steel frames and drop handlebars. Unlike expedition touring bikes they typically sport 700C (622 mm) or 650B (584 mm) sized wheels. Yet like other touring bikes, they stress a relaxed geometry for all day comfort. Low mountain bike gearing is often used and these bikes can usually carry a medium weight load without trouble. Mixed terrain touring bikes fall into this category and are used for mixed terrain touring in the mountains. A few manufacturers like Rawland Cycles, Surly Bikes, and Singular Cycles are now producing these bikes. Salsa has also come up with a related model called the Fargo. But many riders convert older, non-suspension mountain bikes and cyclo-cross bikes for the purpose.

=== Folding/collapsible touring ===
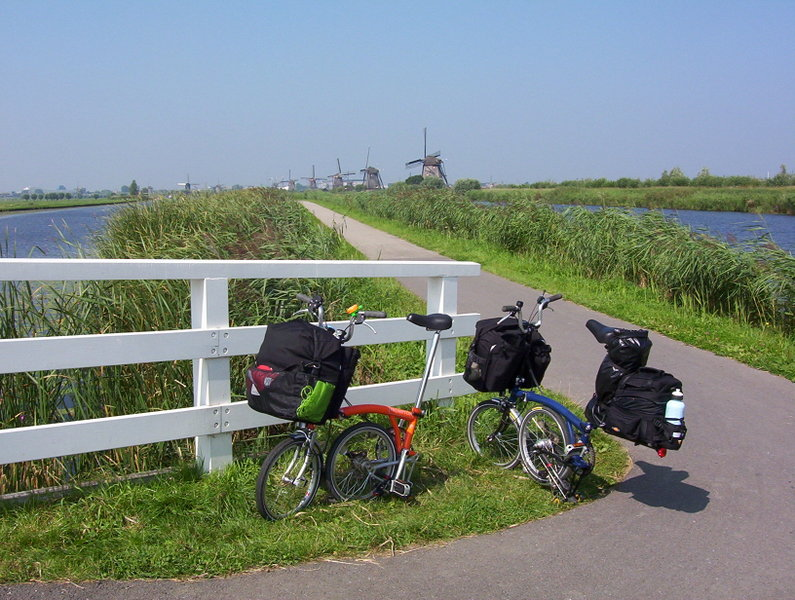
400 mm (16-inch) wheels and loaded for touring

There is an increasing number of specially designed and built or adapted folding bicycles used in bicycle touring. Most are built with 510 mm (20 in) wheel 406 mm rims, although some are built with 400 mm (16-inch) wheels, and the AM series Moulton is built around a specially made 430 mm (17 in) wheel. Moulton's current TSR range use standard 510 mm (20 in) wheels with the 406 mm rim format. Many have ride characteristics just as good as touring bicycles with 660 mm (26-inch) or 700C (622 mm) wheels, but they have the advantage that they can be folded or collapsed for much easier transportation in trains and in airline luggage. The Bike Friday New World Tourist packs into an airline checkable suitcase that can be converted into a trailer and pulled behind the bicycle. The Raleigh Twenty, manufactured from 1968 to 1984, though still commonly available today second hand, is also a popular frame format used to construct collapsible touring bicycles. Other bicycles such as the Surly Travelers Check and the Santana Travel Tandem are full-sized bicycles which do not fold, but instead use bicycle torque couplings to enable separating the frame into two parts for easier transport.

=== Recumbent touring ===
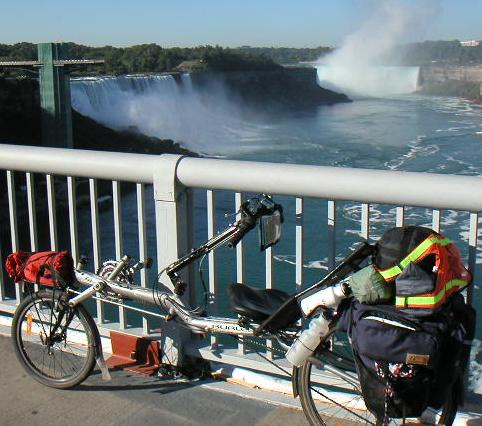
Recumbent with front and rear racks

Recumbents differ from more traditional bicycles in that the rider sits in a reclining or semi-reclining position with their legs in front. Benefits claimed include greater comfort and aerodynamic efficiency. The luggage carrying arrangements of recumbents are also different, often requiring special panniers and racks designed to fit under and behind the seat to provide similar capacity to a conventional touring bike. A disadvantage is that the rider becomes less visible in traffic.

=== Tandem touring ===
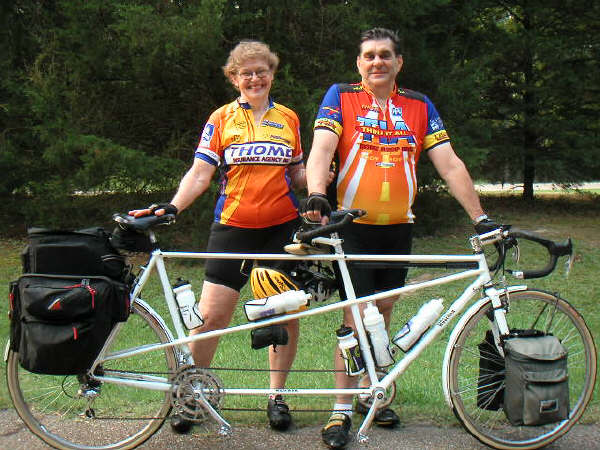
A tandem loaded for bicycle touring

Tandems are bicycles built for two or more riders. They can make it easier for two or more riders of different abilities to ride together and are also used to allow people with disabilities to enjoy cycling. A typical traditional upright tandem does not allow for any more luggage than a solo bicycle, but this limitation can be overcome by pulling a trailer.

== Specifications ==
Touring bicycles are usually equipped with luggage racks front and rear, designed to hold panniers or other forms of luggage. To accommodate long rides, touring bikes have comfortable handlebars and saddles. In fact there are many different bicycle handlebar arrangements available to touring cyclists, the choice of which is highly individual.

=== Frame ===
Touring bicycles may appear similar to road bicycles if they have drop handlebars. However, they greatly differ by typically having a longer wheelbase and more stable steering geometry, with numerous attachments for luggage racks, fenders (mudguards), lights, high capacity water bottles, tools and spare parts. Chainstays must be long enough to accommodate panniers without them brushing the rider's heels, and the entire structure must be stiff enough to safely handle long, fast descents with the machine fully loaded.

To be field-repairable (i.e. welding) and for reliability, touring bicycles typically have a steel (CroMo) frame and fork, however aluminum and titanium are also sometimes used.

=== Wheels ===
Higher quality touring bikes are outfitted with strong wheels that are less likely to break under heavy loads on rough terrain. This means double-wall rims, with usually 36, and sometimes as many as 48, spokes, laced 3 or 4-cross.

Although both sizes are common, wheels are often 660 mm (26-inch, ISO 559) in preference over 700C (622 mm, ISO 622). This is because ISO 559 wheels are used on mountain bicycles and are more durable and often easier to source in remote locations than 700C (622 mm) wheels. World bicycle tourers Tim and Cindie Travis are notable advocates of ISO 559 mountain wheels for touring bicycles. Older touring bicycles may have 630 mm (27-inch) wheels still.

=== Gearing ===
Touring bicycles traditionally use wide-ratio derailleur gears, often with a very low gear, in some countries called a "granny gear", for steep hills under load. Typically the gearing has a triple chainring similar to mountain bicycles, whereas most road bicycles have only two chainrings. Raleigh's 1985 catalogue lists touring bicycles that usually fitted with a 14-32 tooth 6-speed freewheel and 28/45/50-tooth chainrings, typically giving a gear range of 1.84–7.68 metres of development (23 to 96 gear inches). A modern popular combination is to use an 11-34 tooth cassette with 22/32/44-tooth chainrings, typically giving a gear range from 1.44 to 8.32 metres of development (18 to 104 gear inches).

Internal-geared hubs with 5, 7, 8, 11 or even 14 gear ratios have become an option in recent years because of their robustness and low maintenance. In particular, the Rohloff 14-speed hub with a gear range of over 500% has been used on at least two around-the world bicycle tours. Internal-geared hubs have a couple of advantages over traditional derailleur gears, in that they can use stronger chains as generally a single sprocket and chainring combination will be used. Secondly the spread of gears can be made more evenly, that is to say there are many duplicated and unusable gears in a derailleur geared setup.

=== Brakes ===
Touring bicycles usually have linear-pull brakes or cantilever brakes, instead of the caliper brakes used on racing bicycles. Caliper brakes are less suitable because, to fit around mudguards (fenders) and wide tires, they become large and may flex when trying to stop a heavy bike. Some newer touring bikes use disc brakes, because of their greater stopping power in wet and muddy conditions and also to avoid outer rim wear. However, they are more complicated, so repairing them in remote locations can be difficult; they also weigh more than cantilever brakes, increase the stresses on spokes, and require the front wheel to be dished, which reduces the durability of the wheels.

Thus, touring bikes trade speed for utility and ruggedness. This combination is popular with commuters and couriers as well.

=== Trailers ===
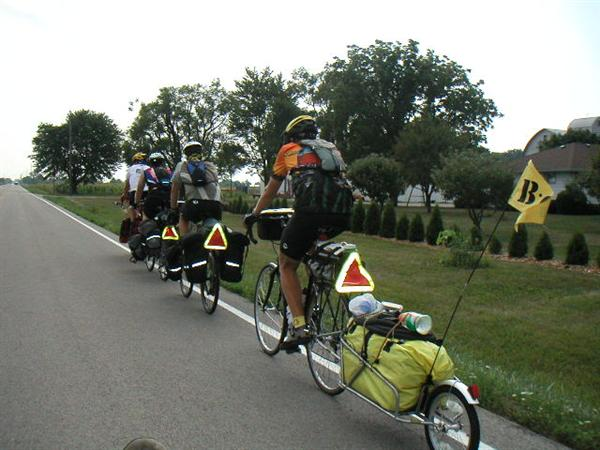
Touring trailers

Instead of panniers, some riders prefer a bicycle trailer. Trailers are easy to use and allow touring with bikes on which it is impossible to attach racks. However, double wheeled trailers decrease maneuverability and are not particularly suited for touring in mountainous regions or on rugged terrain. On the other hand, single wheel trailers are extremely maneuverable, with the trailer wheel tracking very closely with the rear wheel. These can easily be ridden on single track trails (about 40 cm width), over some very technical terrain.

Trailers have an advantage over panniers on single track trails because the bike itself carries no extra weight, except some on the rear axle attachment (the trailer itself can be loaded with up to 70 kg). This allows the rider to shift weight as if without load and clear logs or rocks (trailers will typically follow over anything the bottom bracket clears).

== See also ==
- Bicycle
- Bicycle rack
- Bicycle trailer
- Bicycle touring
- Pannier
- Road bicycle
- Saddlebag
- Touring motorcycle
- Utility bicycle
- Mixed terrain cycle touring
- Gravel bicycle
