= The Notekillers =

American avant-rock band

- Origin: Philadelphia
- Years active: 1977–1981, 2004–present
- Labels: American Bushmen, Ecstatic Peace!, Prophase
- Member of: David First, guitar; Stephen Bilenky, bass; Barry Halkin, drums
- Formerly of: Thomas Johnson, congas

The Notekillers are an instrumental avant-rock band from Philadelphia. The band was created in 1977 by David First (Guitar), Stephen Bilenky (Bass), and Barry Halkin (Drums). They were often categorized as No Wave, and they broke up in 1981. A compilation album was released in 2001, and the band reformed in 2004 to record and perform again.

== Formation and early history ==
The band began in Rhawnhurst, Philadelphia where David Hirsch, Barry Halkin, and Stephen Bilenky attended high school in 1968. Inspired by Love and Spirit, they formed a psychedelic rock group called Dead Cheese which played small gigs at clubs and coffee houses until 1971.

In 1976, Halkin and Hirsch began improvising together again. Hirsch began creating song structures inspired by long-time hero John Fahey, minimalist composers, free jazz, funk music, reggae, and the emerging punk rock movement. He described the unit as "free jazz meets Steve Reich meets Jimi Hendrix".

In early 1977, the duo played as the Notekillers for the first time at a party. Later that year, Stephen Bilenky joined on bass. They practiced six nights a week and lived together in a house they dubbed "The Notel". The band started playing Philadelphia venues like Artemis, Grendel's Lair, Omni, Starlight Ballroom, and a few local colleges. Audiences were indifferent, but the owner of Hot Club, David Carroll, liked the band and kept booking them. As part of their punk ethos, the band eschewed a lead singer. First recalled, "We saw it as the ultimate radical expression of punk sentiment to get rid of that guy altogether."

The band opened for Misfits and DNA. The band's opening slot for Sid Vicious was canceled by his death. Thomas Johnson started intermittently playing congas with the band in 1978.

== The Zipper ==
In a last-ditch attempt at making an impact, the group decide to record a single called "The Zipper" (b/w "Clockwise") in late 1980. The recording was done in the basement of a beauty parlor owned by Bilensky's father. The band pressed 500 copies. Trouser Press called the songs "charging and inventive" instrumentals that combined "the chunkiness of early Kinks with Devo's quirkiness".

The band took a break partially to let Hirsch heal from stress injuries he got from his style of playing. Ed Bahlman loved "The Zipper" and arranged several shows for the Notekillers in the city at venue's like Hurrah, Maxwell's, and CBGB. On their first NYC show, they shared the bill with Glen Branca.

== Hiatus ==
In 1981, despite getting favorable reviews in NYRocker for the Hurrah show and in The Village Voice, Trouser Press, and Op Magazine for their single, The Notekiller's stop playing live shows. Being based in Philadelphia handicapped their fame. They recorded a burlesque of The Ventures' "Walk Don't Run" called "Run Don't Stop". It was to be paired with another track called "Juggernauts" as their second single, but it was never released.

Hirsch moved to New York City in 1984. He changed his name to David First and established himself as an experimental composer. He led bands like the Flatland Oscillators, The World Casio Quartet, and The Koan Pool, with artists like Mark Feldman (violin), Jane Scarpantoni (cello), Frank London (trumpet), Ulrich Krieger (saxophone). Halkin drummed for groups like Devils Grippe and Kandi Jones and established a career as a photographer. Bilenky founded Bilenky Cycle Works, an internationally renowned handmade bicycle manufacturer.

The Notekillers were sometimes cited after their breakup in publications like Volume: International Discography of the New Wave, Who's New Wave in Music, and Spin.

== Reformation ==
In 2001, Mojo Collections asked Thurston Moore to suggest a mix-tape, and he included "The Zipper". First emailed Moore, who responded, "That record was so heavy for me and Kim and Lee". He was thrilled to learn First had more material, and he convinced The Notekillers to release an album on his label Ecstatic Peace!. The compilation Notekillers (1977-1981) was released in 2004.

In The New York Times, Kelefa Sanneh called the album "astonishing" and praised First's guitar, "His diagonal riffs are marvelously untraceable (Surf-rock? New-wave? Heavy metal? Free jazz? Serialism?)". The Village Voice raved, "this kicks". Dusted mused that the band did not quite pull off the genre fusion it attempted but averred, "a close listener can discern a chaotic underpinning to much of the music, a sense of how pummeling the material could have been live."

The album prompted the band to reunite for a release party at Tonic in New York City that October. The bill included Thurston Moore, Jim O’Rourke, Maryanne Amacher, Magik Markers, and Mouthus. The band played SXSW and appeared with Tortoise, Mayo Thompson, Enon, Gary Lucas' Gods & Monsters and at All Tomorrow's Parties festival in the UK. Wired raved about the Notekillers' SXSW set, "Sonic Youth, and by extension half of the decent guitar bands of the past 20 years, channeled Notekillers while honing its early sound.

The Notekillers began working on a new album in early 2006. They released two songs for radio play, "Airport" and "Ants". The album includes appearances by Shelly Hirsch (voice), Lenny Pickett (baritone sax), and John Clark (French horn). The artwork was commissioned from two cartoon artists Halkin met at a local punk rock book fair.

Unhappy with the initial mix in 2008, the band decided to record some of the songs again from scratch. The album, We're Here To Help, was finally released by Prophase Records in 2010. Pitchfork mused, "It's hard to think of a more surprising reunion". The Deli called "Flamenco" the album's highlight and described the album as "both an extension of and break away from The Zipper. Its erratic behavior is more developed, but still has that experimental free-spirit which helped to shape a generation and music genre."

In 2011, the Notekillers contributed "Cream Puff War" to a Grateful Dead tribute album TBR (Prophase).
