= R+E Cycles =

American bicycle manufacturer

Rodriguez tandem with S&S couplings for disassembly. A couple from Seattle rode it to the east coast where the bike was photographed

R + E Cycles, also known as Rodriguez Bicycles, is an American manufacturer of tandem bicycles, cyclocross, mountain (MTB), and road bicycles and components that is currently owned and operated by R + E Bicycle Company in Seattle, Washington. The majority of the bikes sold are custom orders using pre-drawn plans tailored to fit individuals. Their shop tools are all made on-site by their staff and they are the designers of a bicycle fitting system, including software, called Next-fit™. The shop is located on the Ave in Seattle's University District, a few blocks from the University of Washington campus.

== History ==
=== 1970s ===
Angel Rodriguez and Glenn Erickson established 'Rodriguez Bicycles' in 1973. The sales and service shop was called R+E Cycles. Rodriguez and Erickson began building bicycles and tandem bicycles and sponsored a racing team.

=== 1980s ===
Rodriguez and Erickson separated in the early 1980s and Rodriguez expanded the shop. Rodriguez worked with the city of Seattle to create Seattle's first ‘on-street’ bicycle only parking area. He also created a professional tandem catalog and opened the first ‘all mountain bike’ store in the Northwest, Mountain Bike Specialists. The current owner, Dan Towle started with Rodriguez Bicycles in 1987 as a bicycle fitter and salesperson, moving on to manage the repair and assembly departments until 1991. In this decade Angel Rodriguez started the brand 'TerraTech', produced in Japan. 'TerraTech' bicycles were produced in a touring model and mountain bike models. In 1990 the shop was voted the best bicycle shop in the country by the readers of Bicycling Magazine. At this time R+E Cycles had over 50 employees.

=== 1990s ===
The company was sold in 1990. Dan Towle left in December 1991, along with other employees. In May, 1993 the new owner of R+E Cycles filed for bankruptcy. Rodriguez had financed the sale of the business and was able to recover the business. Angel Rodriguez asked Towle, Estelle Gray and Towle's wife, Marcie, to take over the business.

=== 1993–1999 ===
By 1995, R + E cycles had developed a web presence. They also began the process of computerizing their bike fitting process. By 1998 their process attracted the attention of a local computer magazine who ran a feature article on them. R+E cycles designed and built a women's specific bicycle line through the 1990s. In 1996, they introduced the women specific Rodriguez Stellar. In 1997, the Stellar was reviewed in Bicycling magazine. They also introduced the Toucan tandem. By the end of the 1990s they had a full line of U.S. made production Rodriguez bicycles.

=== 2000–2010 ===
In 2001 sales slowed and by 2003 R+E Cycles moved from 22 employees to 6. At this time Towle's business partner retired and moved away. They retooled their website and redesigned their line of bicycles, and began hiring staff and building more bicycles. They installed a coffee shop (Pedal a Latte’) to serve their staff and customers. They worked with bicycle traveler Willie Weir to design and market a bicycle that R + E Cycles had built for him in 1996, the Willie Weir Adventure (UTB) bicycle. In 2005 they acquired Bushnell Cycle design, hired Master Frame Builder Dennis Bushnell, and patented their bottom bracket design. R + E Cycles designed a fully functional bicycle fitting system, including software, called Next-fit™, which was introduced in February 2006. In this year the Puget Sound Business Journal published an article on R + E Cycles. They worked with the city over several years to update their ‘on-street’ bike parking area, installing a new heavy duty bike rack (shaped like a car).

=== 2011 - Today ===
In 2012 Rodriguez Bicycle Company teamed up with Glenn Erickson to offer Erickson Custom Bicycles. In 2014 R+E Cycles built a Seattle Seahawks-themed bicycle for Super Bowl XLVIII. This bicycle was used by Seattle Mayor Ed Murray in a friendly bet with Denver Mayor Michael Hancock.

== Models ==
=== Touring and Commuting ===
- Adventure
- UTB
- Rainier (Limited, Classic, Force)
- Phinney Ridge (Disc brakes)

=== Road Race ===
- Competition
- Outlaw

=== Fixed gear ===
- Make-Shift
- Shiftless

=== Cyclocross/road ===
- Cyclocross

=== Folding ===
- 6-pack

=== Tandem ===
- Classic tandem
- Toucan ST
- Super light
- 8-ball convertible tandem
- xtra long bikes
- Makeshift tandem
