= Pedersen bicycle =

Danish bicycle

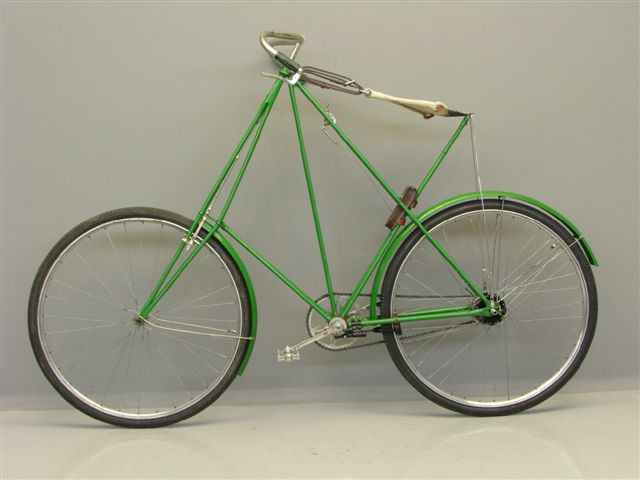
Dursley Pedersen bicycle circa 1910

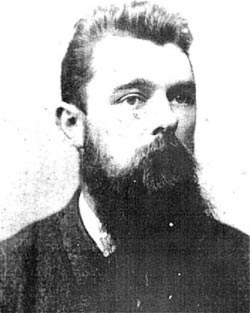
Mikael Pedersen, the inventor

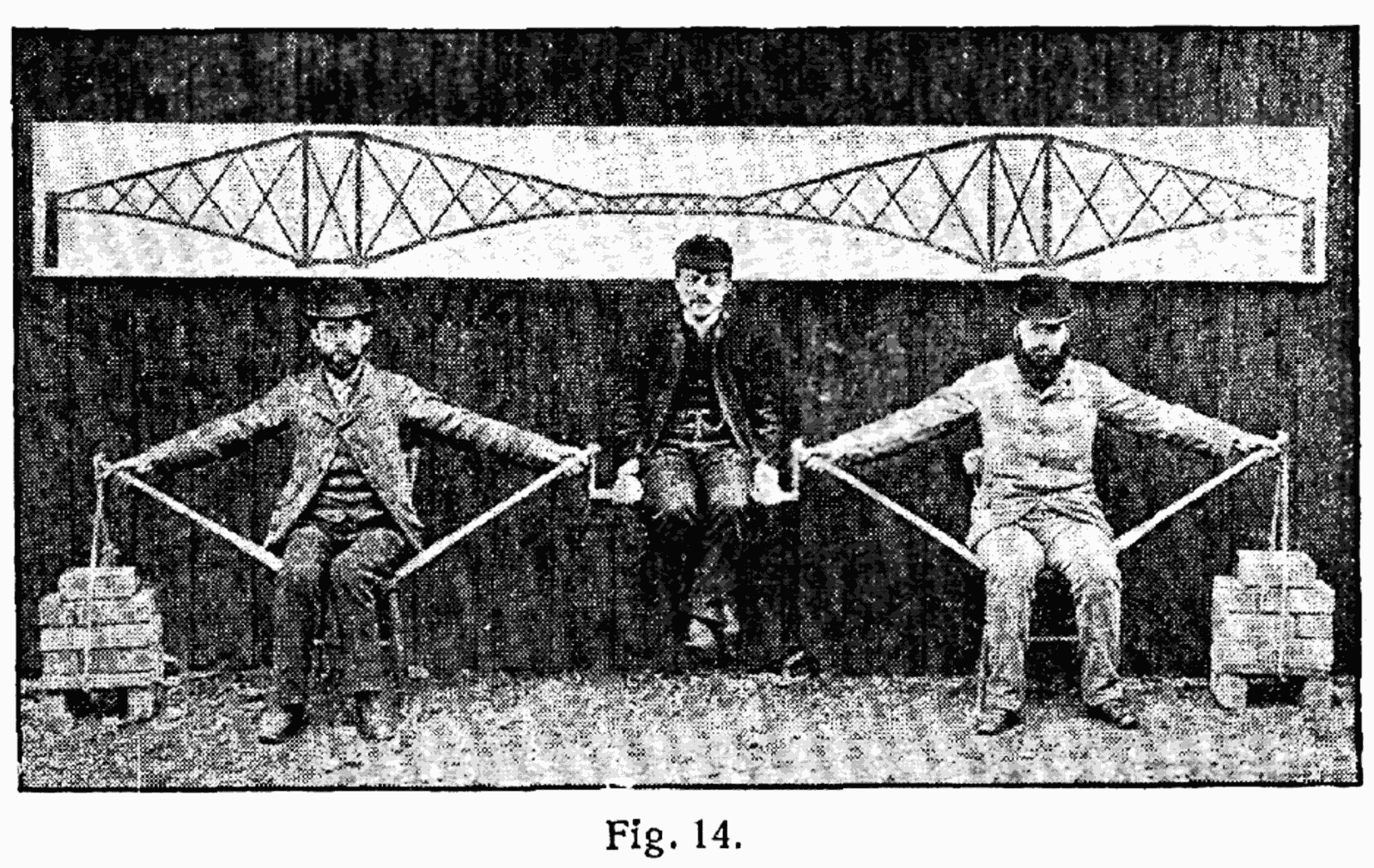
A pictorial explanation of the famous cantilever Forth Rail Bridge that Pedersen used to market his frame design

The Pedersen bicycle, also called the Dursley Pedersen bicycle is a bicycle that was developed by Danish inventor Mikael Pedersen and produced in the English town of Dursley. Though never hugely popular, they enjoy a devoted following and are still produced today. Their unusual frame is described as pure cross, was marketed as cantilever, and features a distinctive hammock-style saddle. Variations include lightweight racing, tandem, and folding designs. Other Pedersen innovations include two and three-speed internally geared rear hubs.

== History ==
Pedersen received a patent in the United Kingdom for his bicycle in the early 1890s and constructed the first model out of wood. He formed the Pedersen Cycle Frame Co. Ltd and when that fell into financial difficulties, production was continued by the Dursley Pedersen Cycle Co. The design was also licensed to other manufacturers, and approximately 30,000 units were produced by the early 1920s, but the design never really caught on. In 1978, Jesper Sølling resumed production in Copenhagen and has been followed by others.

== Technology ==
Pedersen wrote that he developed the hammock style seat first. It provides suspension from road imperfections with much less weight, 4 ounces (110 g) instead of 3 pounds (1.4 kg) of traditional leather and steel spring saddles of the day. Pedersen then developed a frame, a truss assembled from several thin tubes, around his new seat design. He attributed his inspiration to the Whipple-Murphy bridge truss. The design initially did not support seat height adjustment, and even after some adjustability was added, required the manufacture of eight different sizes. The non-standard frame design would not accommodate a traditional front fork. Instead, Pedersen developed a fork that also consisted of thin tubes assembled into a truss, which was attached to the frame with bearings at two distinct points, instead of through a traditional head tube. Pedersen also received patents for a chainwheel and bottom bracket combination and lightweight pedals.

== Gallery ==
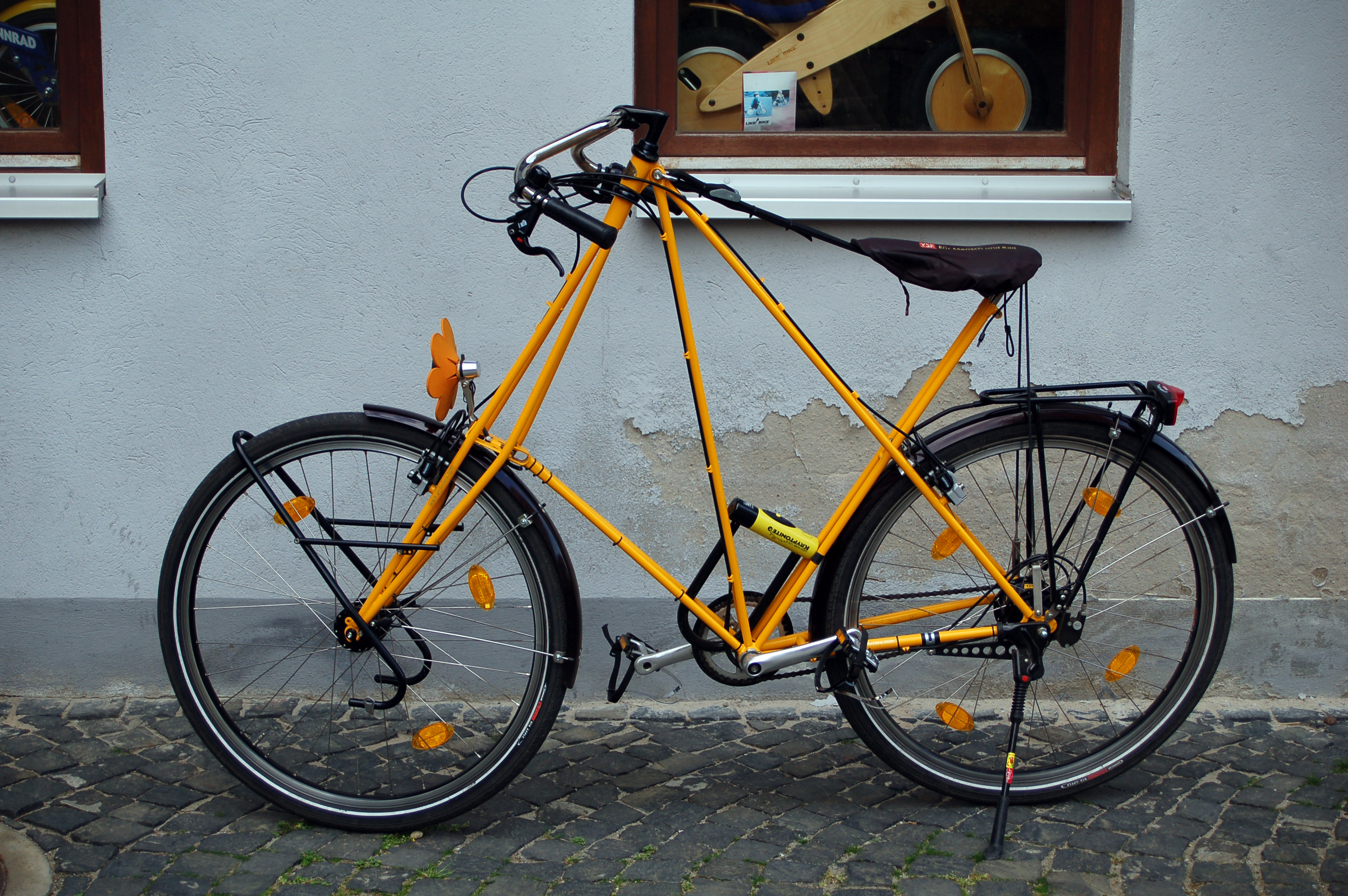
Modern Pedersen bicycle.

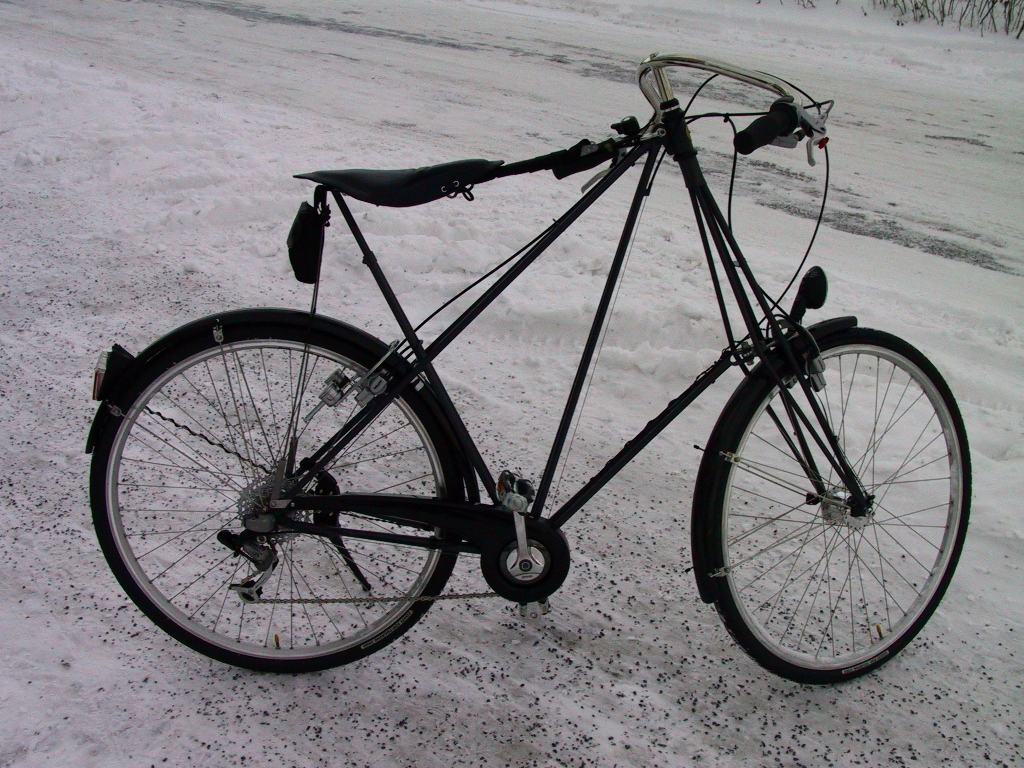
Modern Pedersen bicycle.

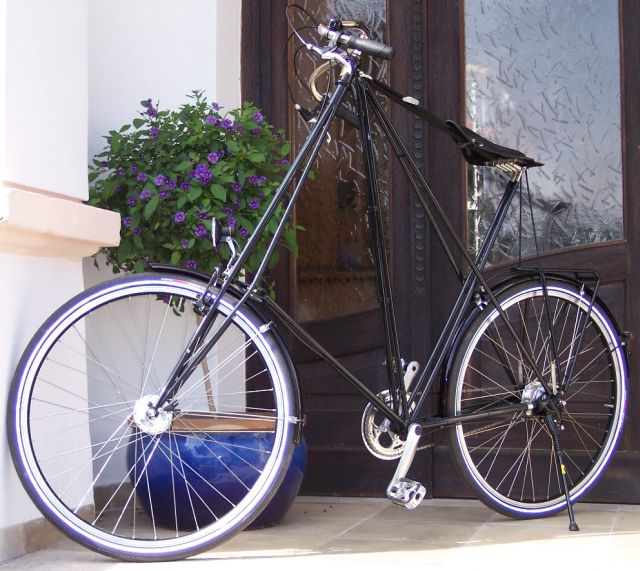
Modern Pedersen bicycle.

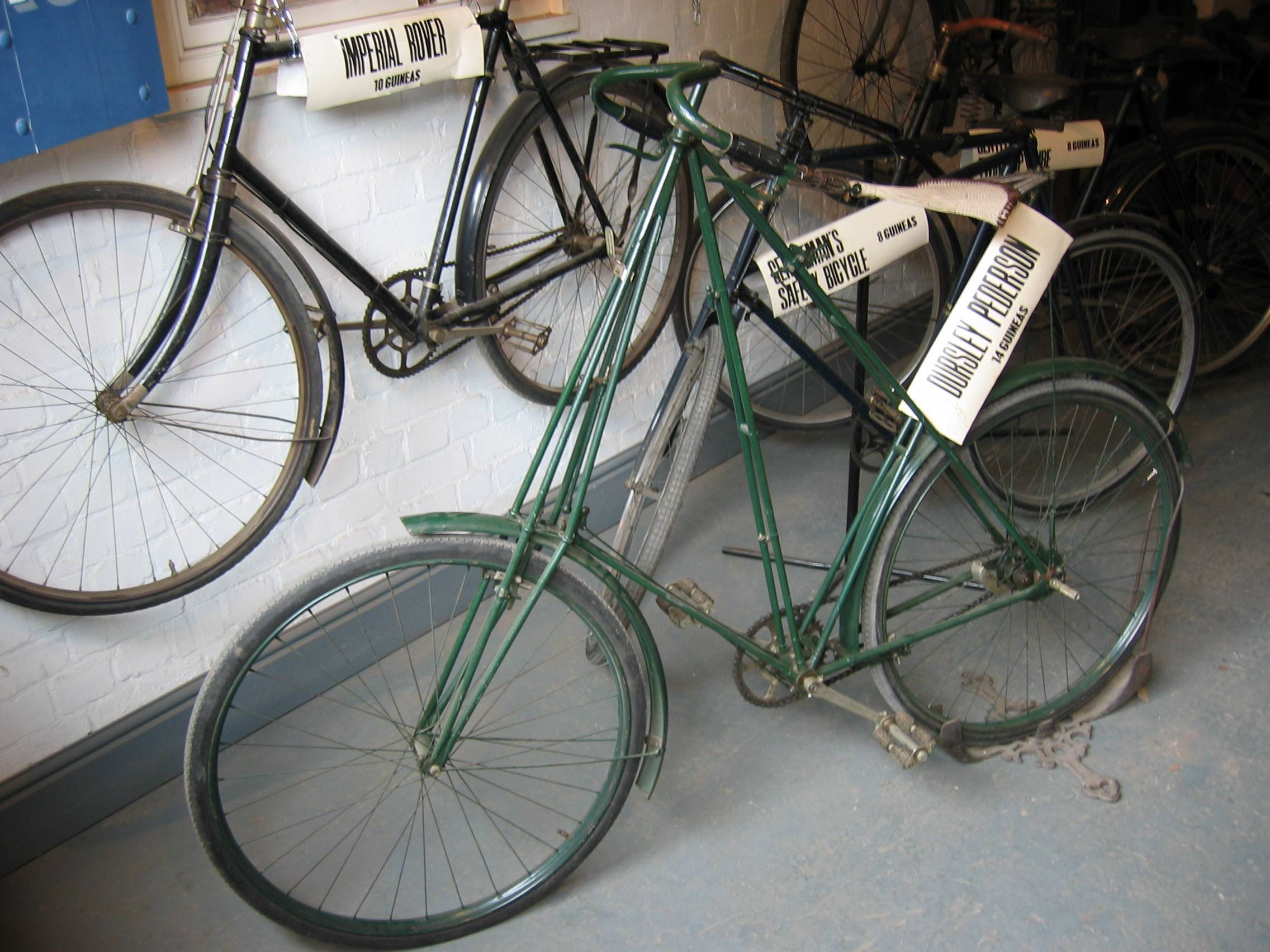
Antique Pedersen on display.

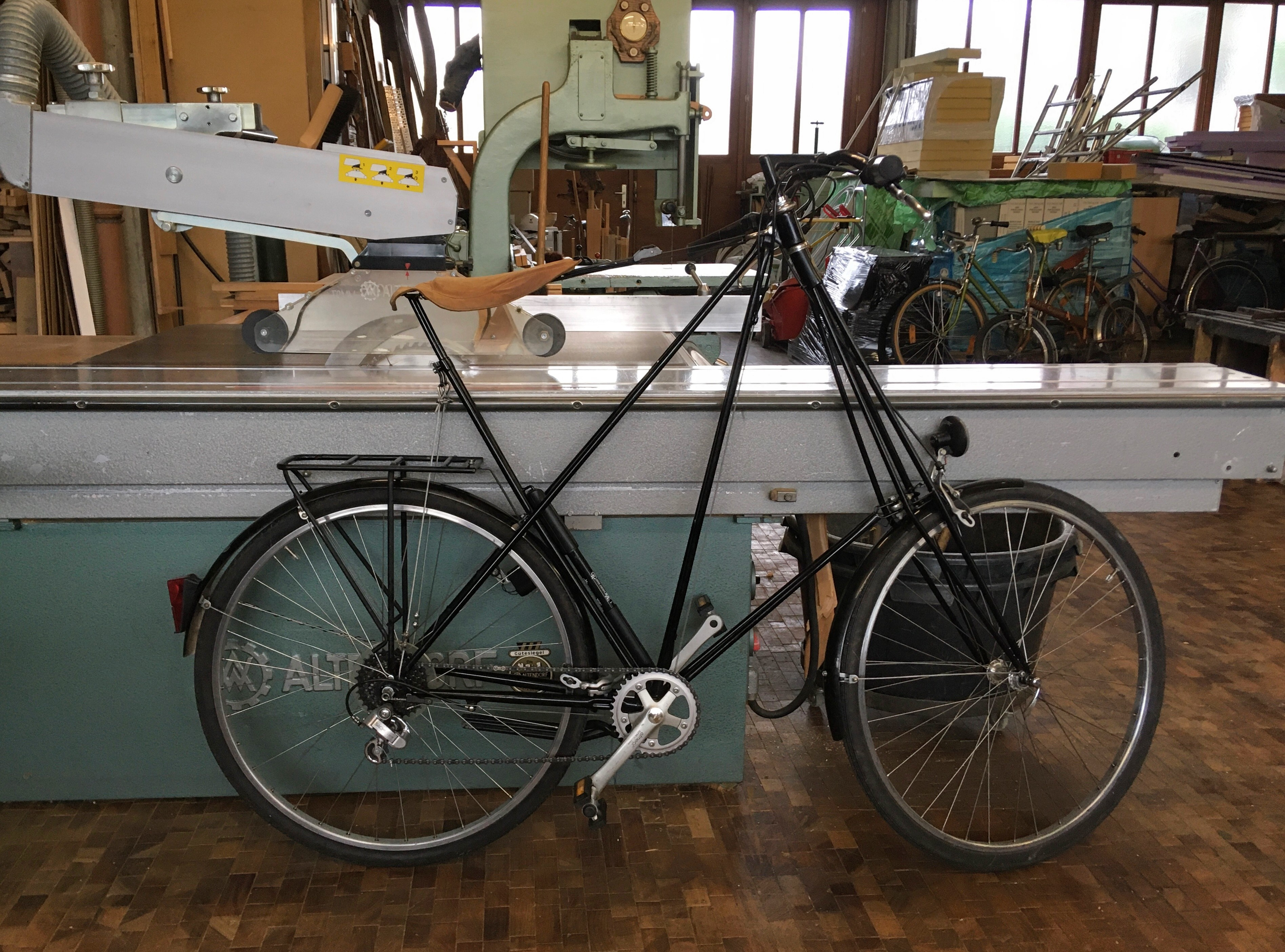
Replica of a Pedersen bicycle, built in 1993 in Düsseldorf, Germany.
