= Mikael Pedersen =

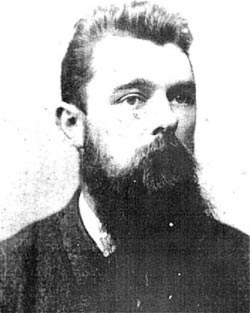
Mikael Pedersen

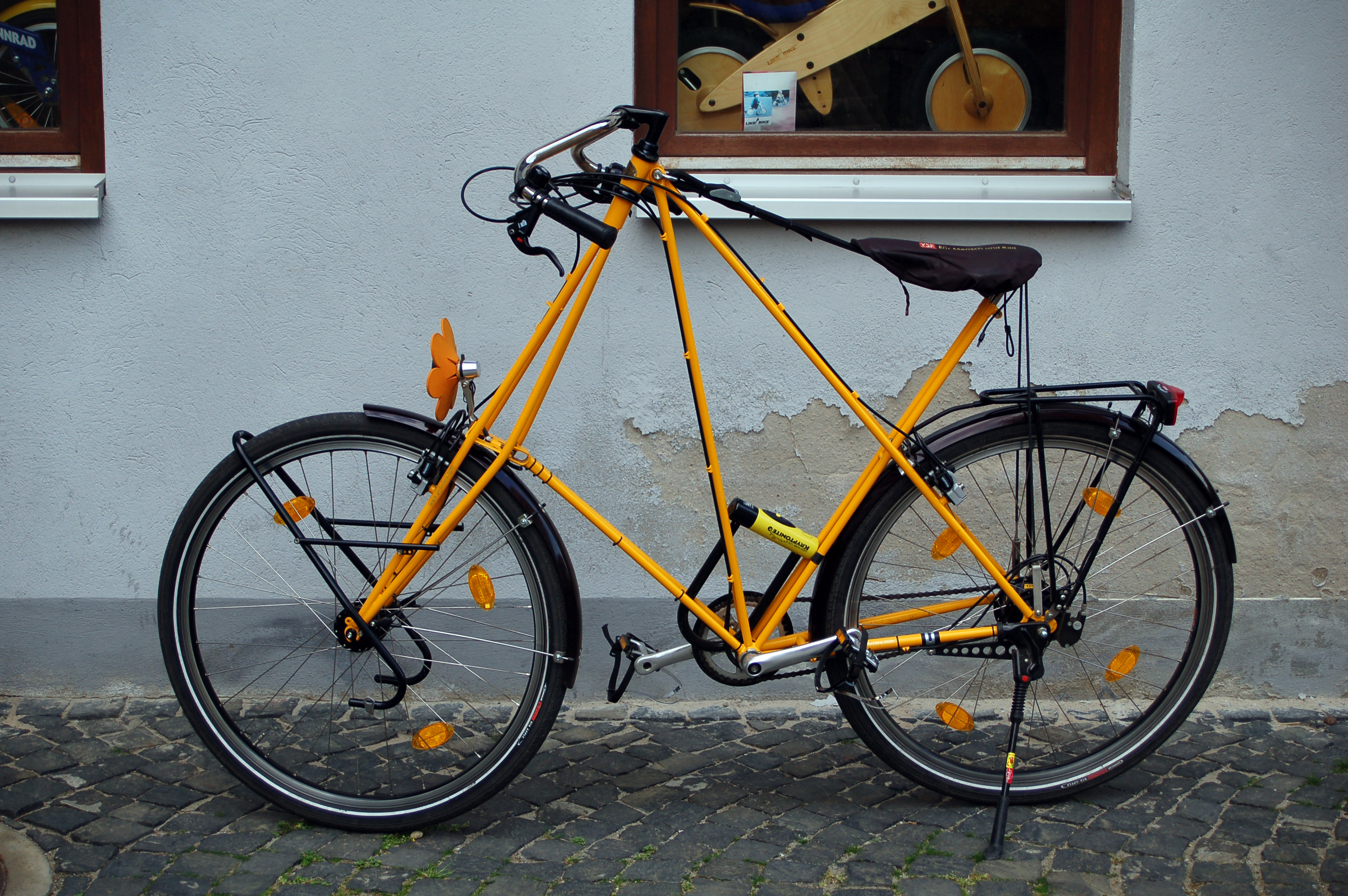
Present day Pedersen bicycle

Mikael Pedersen (25 October 1855 Fløng – 22 October 1929, Bispebjerg) was a Danish inventor much associated with the English town of Dursley. He is chiefly known today for the highly distinctive Pedersen bicycle. His story is one of rags to riches and back again, and he was largely forgotten in his native country, but fans of the Pedersen bicycle arranged for him to be reburied and a memorial erected at Dursley.

== Inventions ==
Pedersen invented and patented a novel corn thresher capable of separating corn from chaff, a transmission system, a gear system for horse drawn mills and a braking system for waggons, among other ideas. He was also musical, and although his primary trade was that of a smith, he was listed as a musician in the 1890 census.

Pedersen was involved in the development of a continuous centrifuge for the churning and separation of cream and butter from milk - that is, one which did not need to be stopped in order to remove the cream. This separator was patented in 1878; Pedersen's involvement was not noted, a matter which angered him. Pedersen subsequently worked on further refinements, leading to patents and considerable income. His refined version of the centrifuge is still in use today. The rights were bought by Koefoed and Hauberg in Copenhagen, and as part of an export drive they made contact with R A Lister and Company, of Dursley in Gloucestershire, England.

== Life in England ==
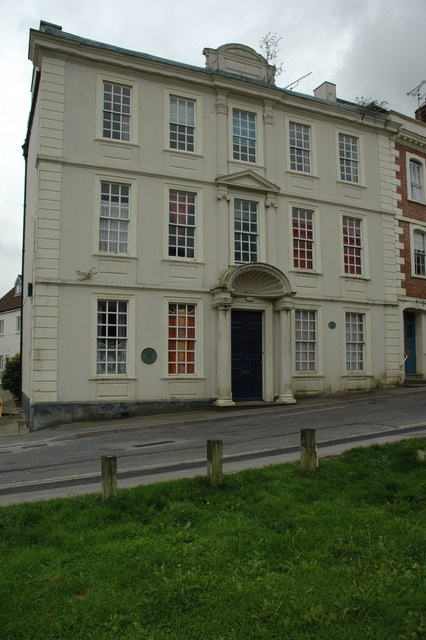
Home of Pedersen in Dursley from 1897 to 1918

Robert Ashton Lister suggested that Pedersen come to England to set up local assembly with parts shipped from Denmark, and this he agreed to do, bringing his mistress Dagmar with him (he was by this time separated from his wife Laura). The separator was highly successful in the English market and Pedersen became rich, renting the largest house in Dursley and becoming prominent in society in the town. He formed a choir and took part in concerts, and set up a number of social and sporting groups.

During a visit to his brother Hans Mathias in Denmark, Pedersen met and fell in love with a girl, Ingeborg Jensen, 29 years his junior, bringing her back to Dursley in 1907. In 1908 she gave birth to their first child, a boy named Palnatoke. They also had a daughter who died at the age of two years and two further sons, Vagn (Vaughan) and Svend (born in 1914).

In Dursley, Pedersen set up manufacture of his unusual and ingenious cantilevered bicycle, which earned a small but devoted following.

Unfortunately Pedersen lacked business acumen and was both profligate and prone to being cheated. He left Dursley unannounced when in his sixties, leaving his family behind, and Ingeborg subsequently returned to Denmark, marrying Jens Kristoffer Jensen, who adopted the children.

Pedersen was spotted by a friend selling matches in London, and the friend arranged to pay his way back to Denmark in 1920. He died in 1929, poor and virtually unknown, and was buried in an unmarked grave in Bispebjerg, a suburb of Copenhagen.

== Reburial ==
In 1995 a collection was started by enthusiasts for the Pedersen bicycle to raise funds in order to bring Mikael Pedersen's remains back to Dursley and re-bury them there. This was achieved in 1995, and the service was attended by over 300 people including the Bishop of Gloucester, representatives from the Danish Embassy and Pedersen's grandchildren.
