= Santana Cycles =

American tandem bicycle manufacturer

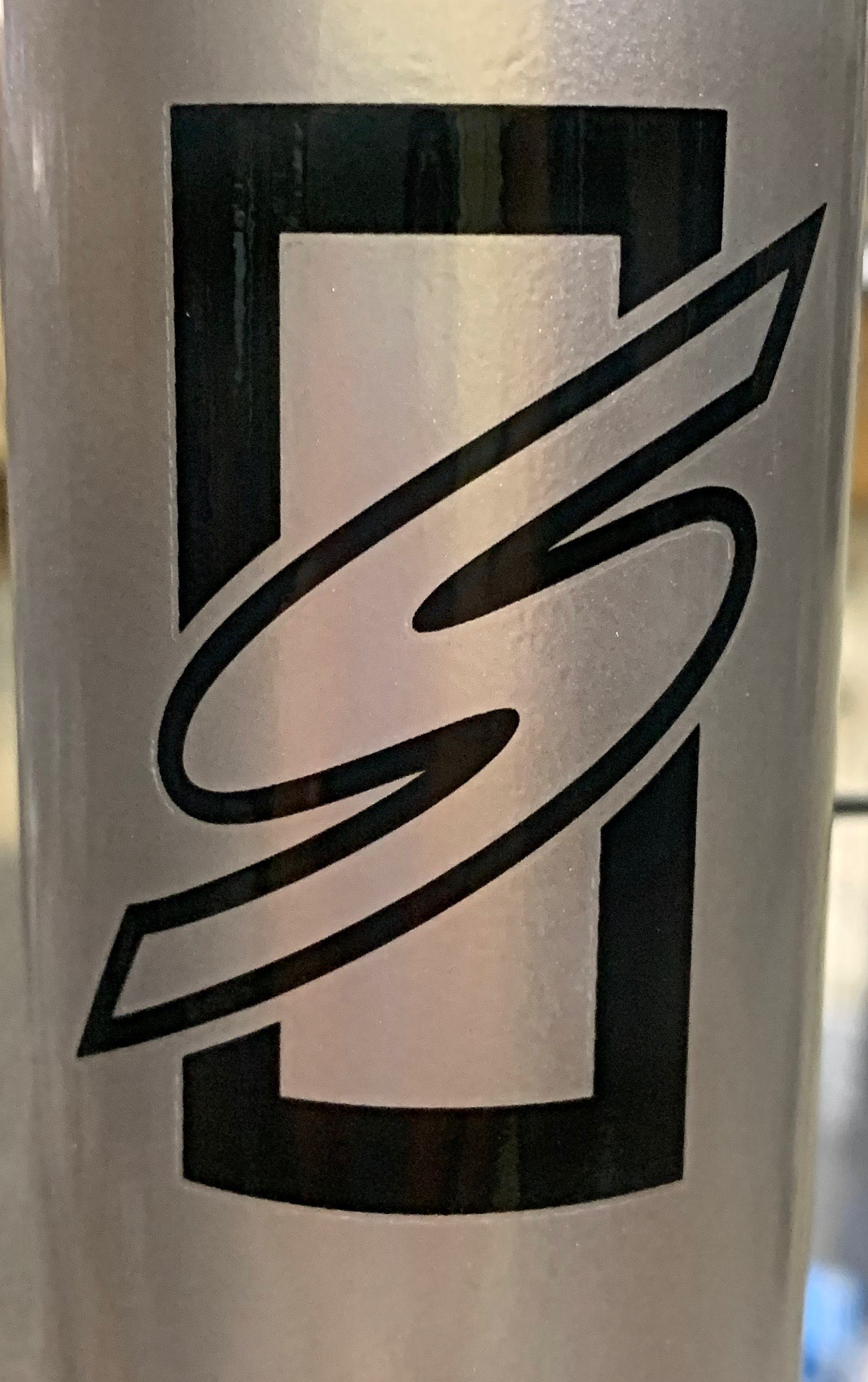
- Industry: Bicycles
- Founded: 1976; 50 years ago
- Headquarters: La Verne, California, USA
- Key people: Bill McCready, Founder
- Products: Bicycle and Related Components
- Website: santanatandem.com

Santana Cycles is the world's leading manufacturer of tandem bicycles. Santana was founded in 1976 by Bill McCready, an associate editor at Bicycling Magazine, and is located in La Verne, California. In the 1970s "Santana virtually re-invented the tandem, which had been in decline since the second world war." In 2002, Santana was described as the largest manufacturer of "enthusiast level" tandem bicycles.

== See also ==
- List of bicycle brands and manufacturing companies
- Outline of cycling
