= Bottle cage =

Device used to affix a water bottle to a bicycle

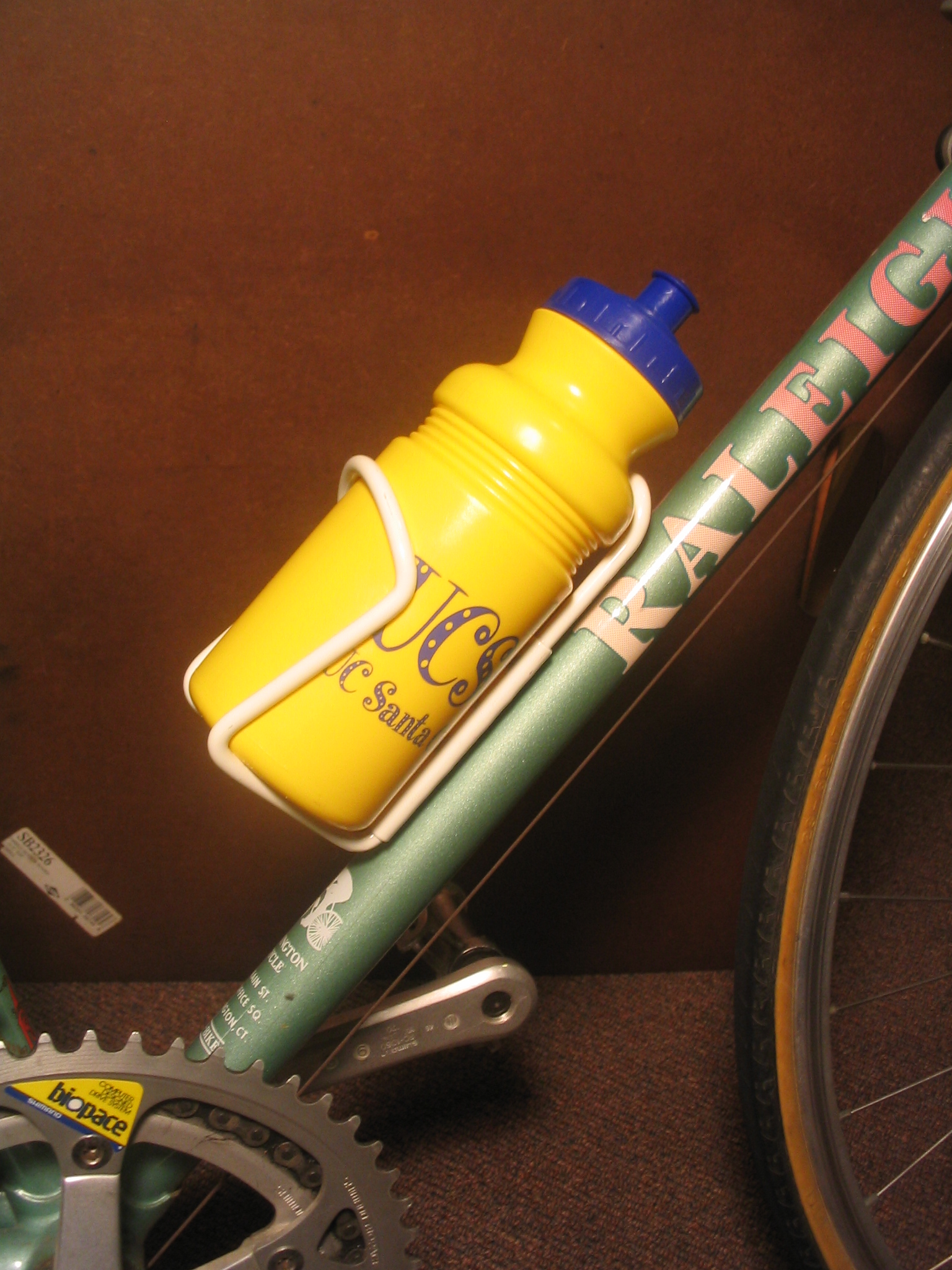
White bottle cage holding water bottle, attached to down tube

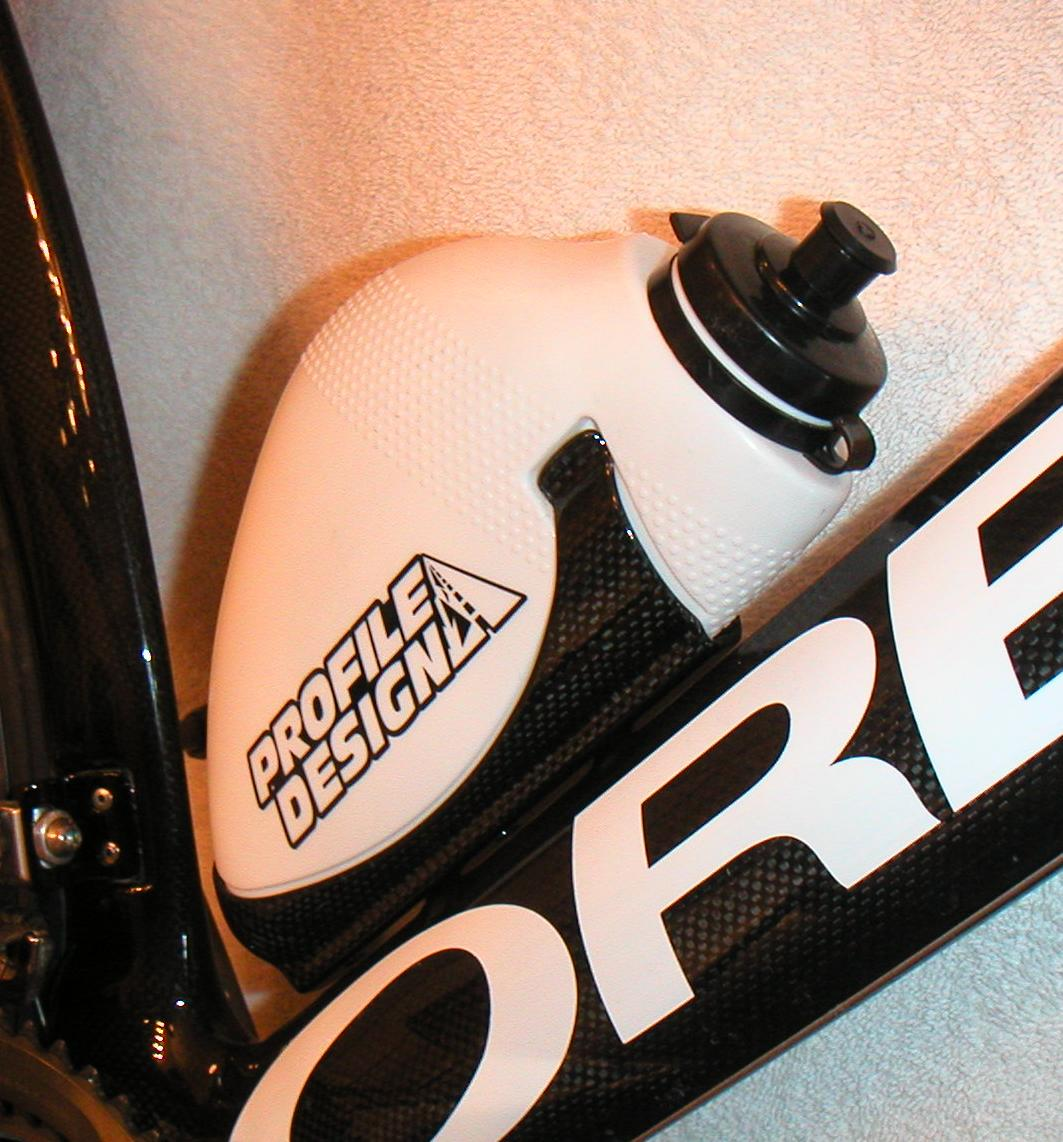
Aerodynamically shaped bottle with matching carbon fiber cage

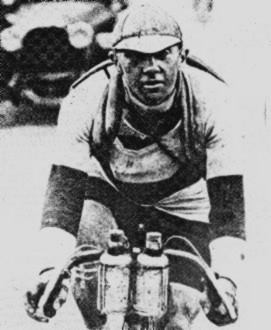
Water bottle placement during 1919 Tour de France

A bottle cage is a device used to affix a water bottle to a bicycle. Composed of plastic, aluminum, stainless steel, titanium or carbon fiber, it is attached to the main frame of a bicycle, the handlebars, behind the saddle, or, in uncommon cases, the fork. Most modern bicycles have threaded holes in the frame to hold the bottle cage, often called braze-ons even though they may be welded, glued, riveted, or moulded into the frame material. Clamps are necessary on bicycles not so equipped, such as older or less expensive models.

== Locations ==
The most common location for a frame-mounted bottle cage is on the top side of the downtube. The most common location for a second frame-mounted bottle cage is on the front side of the seat tube. Small bikes and mountain bikes with rear suspension often do not have enough room for two bottle cages inside the main frame triangle. Some mountain bikes have highly sloped top tubes that limit the size of bottles mounted inside the triangle.

Some touring bicycles have a third frame mounting location: under the downtube.

Bottle cages may be mounted behind the seat with a bracket that attaches to the seatpost.

Some uncommon forks include bottle cage mounts.

Tandem bicycles may have as many as six bottle cages.

Recumbent bicycles may have bottle cages mounted to the steering mechanism or behind the seat back.

== Styles ==
The vast majority of bottle cages consist of a single hoop of metal tubing or rod bent to hold the bottle snugly and engage the neck, or an indentation in the case of larger bottles, to prevent it from bouncing out.

Varieties, often made out of plastic or carbon fiber, may completely encircle the bottle.

Some manufacturers have released non-standard bottles and cages that only work with each other in order to offer specialized shapes (streamlined, for example) or restrict consumers from purchasing brand-specific items.

== Standards ==
=== Mounting points ===
The standard bottle cage has two mounting holes, two and a half inches (64 mm) apart, to match the threaded holes in the frame, and through which small bolts pass. Some have a strap, adjustable for non standard bottles. A fork might include bottle mounts as well. If equipped a 3 hole configuration is normally used to allow the cage to be mounted higher or lower on the fork. The holes are usually sized and threaded to accept an M5 × 0.8 bolt, which means standard coarse metric threads with 5 mm in diameter and 0.8 mm pitch.

=== Bottle ===
The standard size bottle cage holds a bottle 73 mm in diameter and 127 mm tall (2-7/8 inches or 2.875″ diameter and five inches long), or bottles in other lengths with an indentation that far from the bottom for the tab on the cage to engage.

== Other uses ==
Some examples of bicycle lighting take advantage of the bottle cage by using it to hold a bottle-shaped battery to power the lights. This sort of bicycle lighting has proved popular.

Many small tire pumps come with a mounting bracket intended to be mounted alongside a bottle cage.

The Trek Soho 3.0 comes with a stainless steel coffee mug designed to fit in the bottle cage mounted on the front side of the seat tube.

In addition to the fairly standard cycling water bottle, cages have been produced to hold commercial 1 liter and 1.5 liter water bottles.

== History ==
Until the 1960s, cyclists often carried a second bottle on the handlebars, held by a bottle cage fixed to the handlebars themselves and by a third point to the handlebar stem. Such bottle cages are familiar from pictures of the Tour de France. Riders had a cage there rather than have two on the frame, where the centre of gravity is lower, because at the time the Tour's rules insisted that riders carry a pump. The pump took up the length of one frame tube and made a second bottle cage on the frame impossible.

The cage designed specifically for Tour de France is considered as a small yet efficient invention. The invention was created by Croatian inventor Guillio (his last name was not known).

== Gallery ==
Touring bicycle with three bottle cages

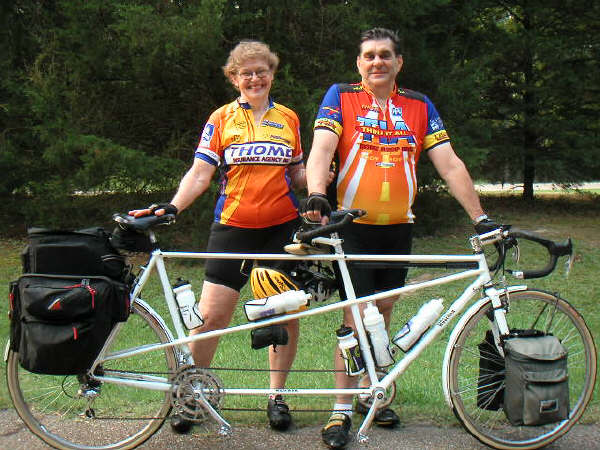
Tandem bicycle with six bottle cages

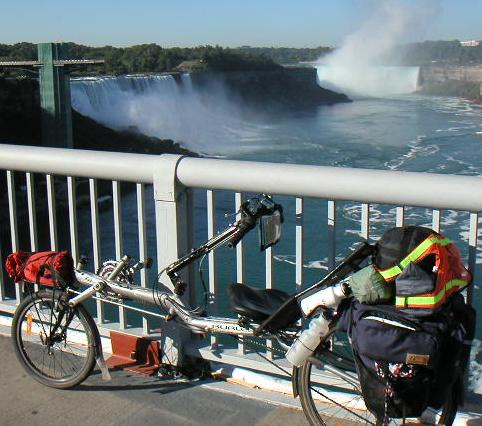
Recumbent bicycle with bottle cages mounted behind the seat back

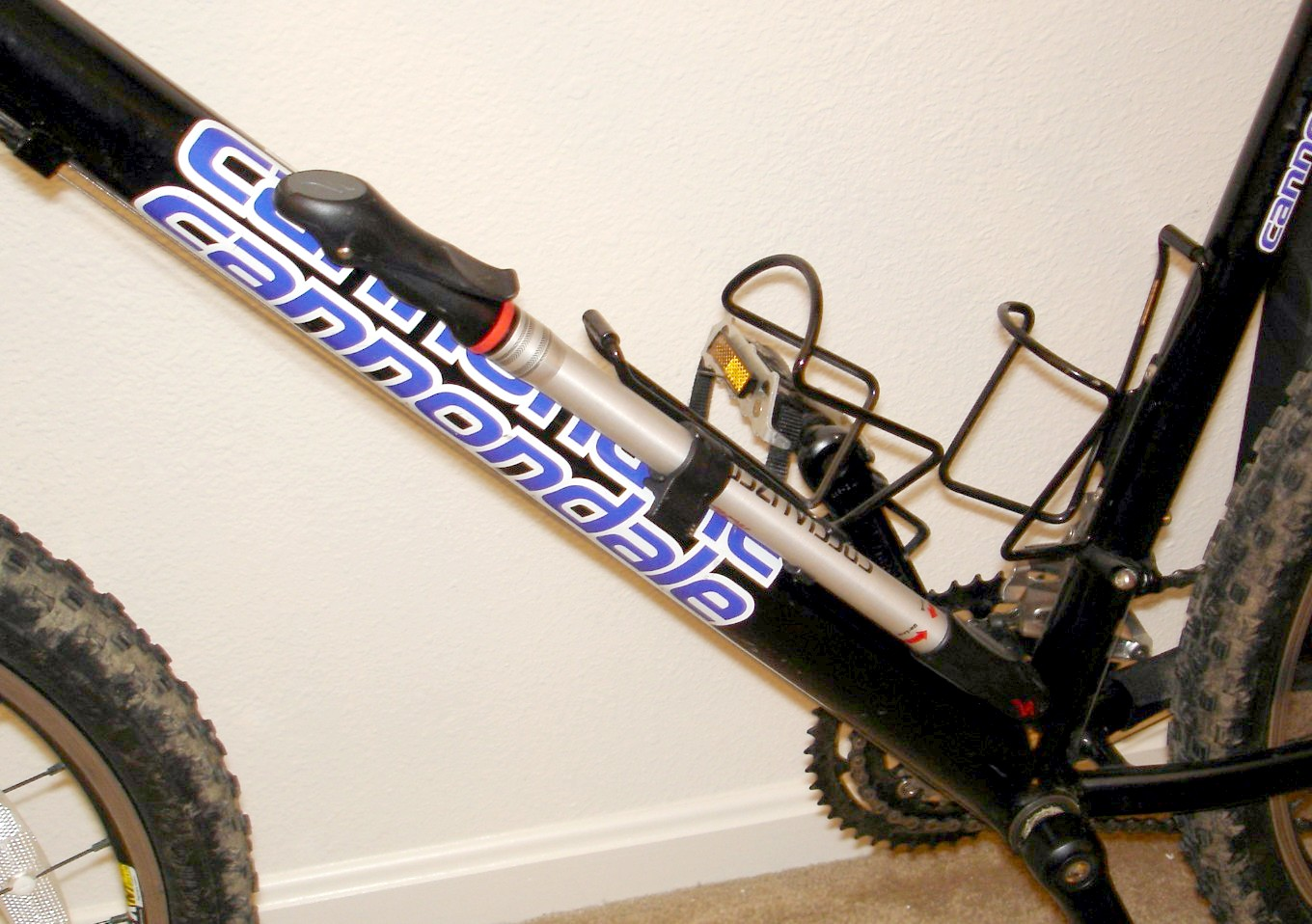
Tire pump mounted alongside bottle cage

== See also ==
- Bottle sling
