= Softride =

American bicycle manufacturer

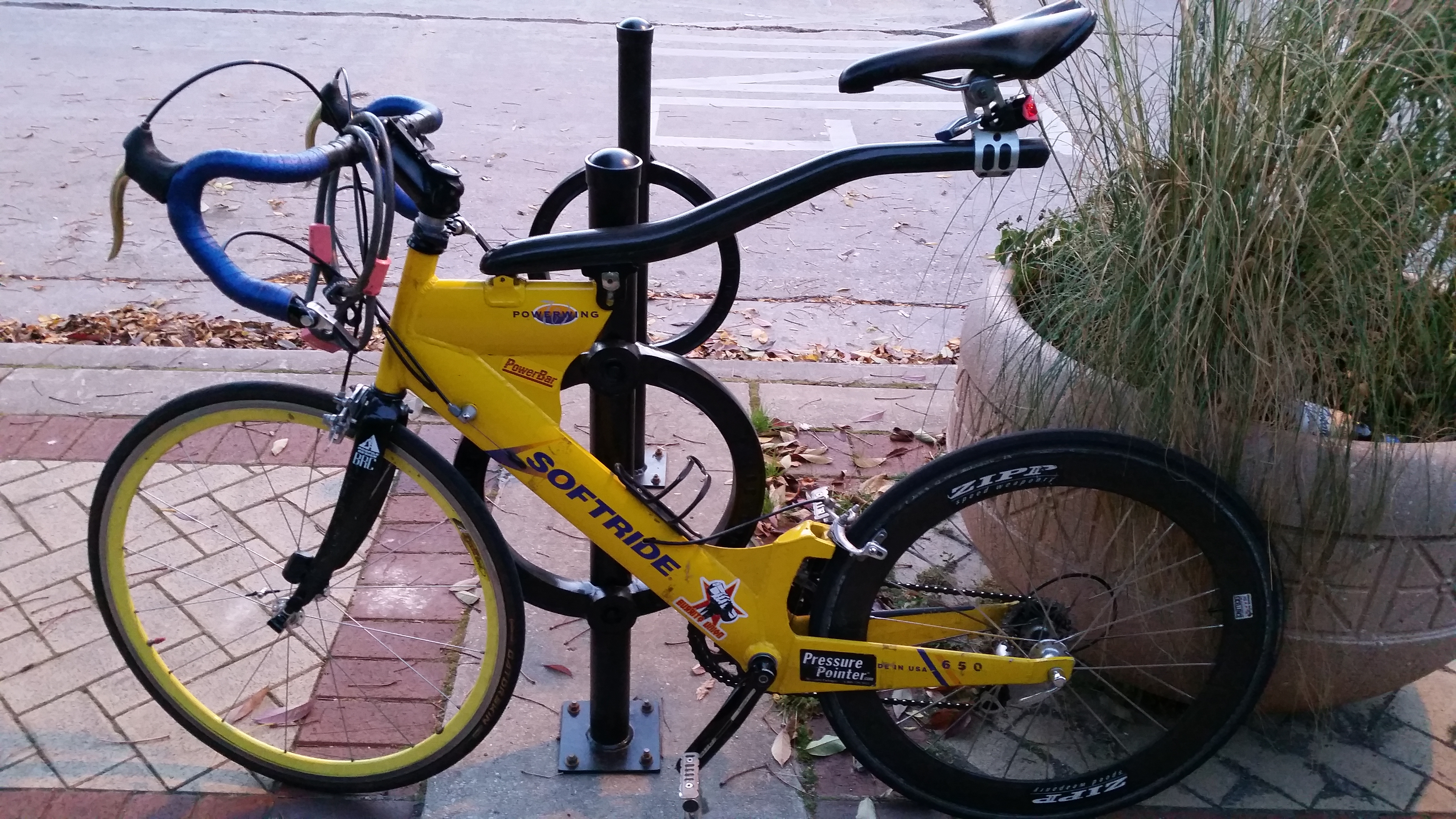
Softride suspension bicycle

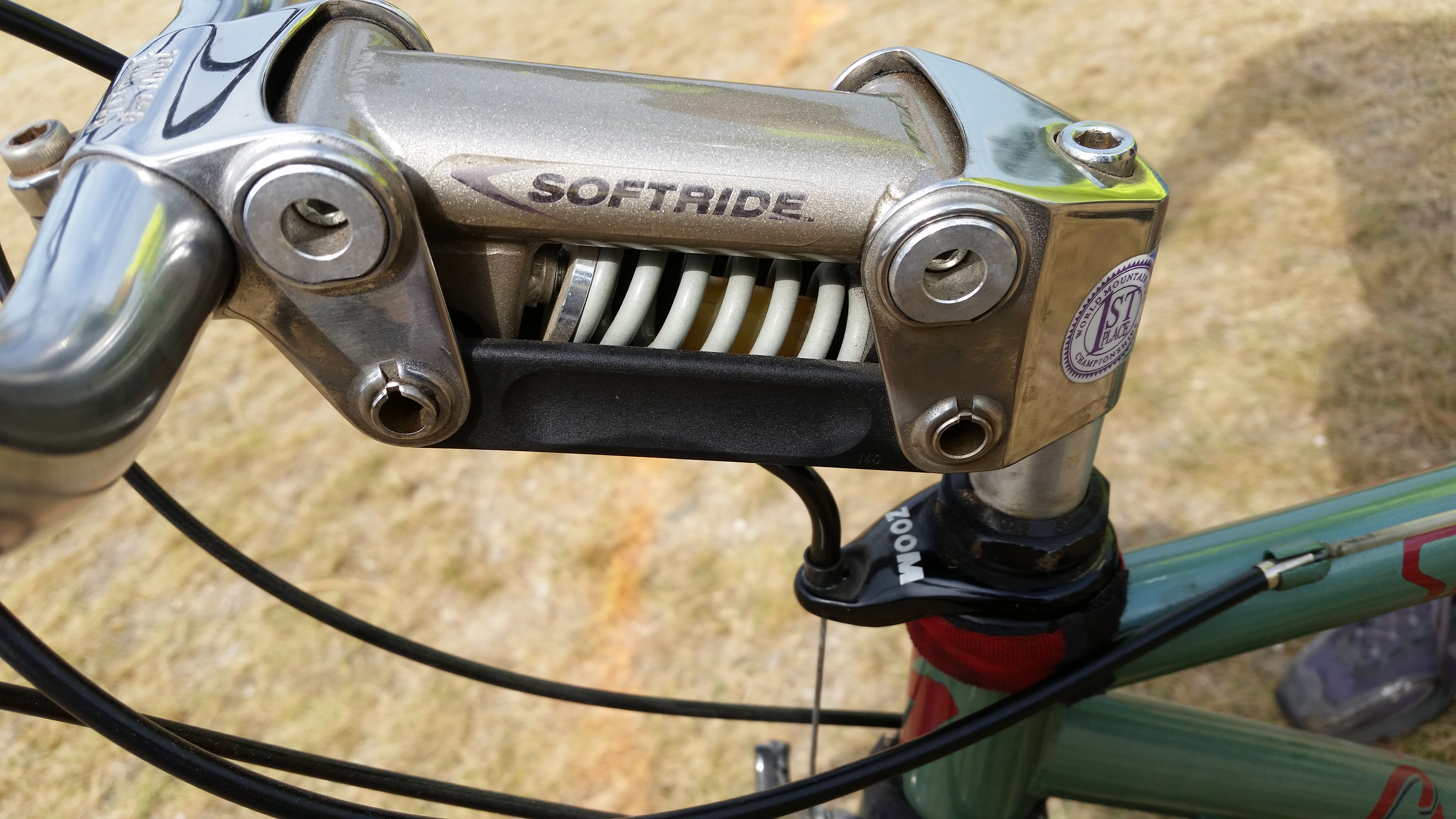
Softride suspension bicycle stem

Softride was a manufacturer of bicycles located in Bellingham, Washington. They specialized in bicycles for triathletes. The bicycle frames were distinctive for their lack of seat tubes and seat stays. The idea was to reduce aerodynamic drag and improve ride comfort. The company no longer manufactures bicycles, and focuses on bicycle carriers instead.

The design was developed by James Allsop and David Calopp, and became the most successful of the beam suspension systems. It was intended as a retrofit for traditional diamond frame bicycles, at first, but there were concerns about causing frame damage.

Notable Softride users included Greg Welch and Jürgen Zäck. In a survey of bicycles ridden at the 1996 Ironman World Championship in Kona, Hawaii, there were 126 Softrides, out of 857 total bicycles, representing 14.7%. That was an increase from the 11.9% of 798 bicycles in 1995.

== Softride Suspension System ==
The Softride Suspension System was launched at the Interbike 1989 bike show. The original SRS systems consisted of two foam filled fiberglass boxes bonded together with a viscoelastic layer. Originally intended for the use in mountain bikes, Softride produced its first full-fledged mountain bike, the PowerCurve, in 1991. During 1996 Softride released its first aluminum frame road bike, the Classic TT. The Softride Suspension System is used almost exclusively for triathlon racing. Softride ceased bicycle production in 2007 after the design was banned from UCI races.

A closely related suspension design to the Softride is the Zipp 2001, a contemporary competing beam bicycle, where the suspension was in the hinge, rather than in flex of the beam itself.

== Suspension stems ==
Softride also designed and marketed suspension stems.
