= Notching =

Metal-cutting process

Notching is a metal-cutting process used on sheet-metal or thin bar-stock, sometimes on angle sections or tube. A shearing or punching process is used in a press, so as to cut vertically down and perpendicular to the surface, working from the edge of a work-piece. Sometimes the goal is merely the notch itself, but usually this is a precursor to some other process: such as bending a corner in sheet or joining two tubes at a tee joint, notching one to fit closely to the other.

Notching is a low-cost process, particularly for its low tooling costs with a small range of standard punches. The capital cost of the punch press can be expensive though, so small fabrication shops often out-source their notching work to a press shop or notching specialist. Notching of large or heavy sections, particularly for large tube fabrication or HVAC, is increasingly carried out by plasma-cutting rather than punch tools. The first punch & die type tool for notching tube & pipe was invented in Chicago by Julius Vogel, who was issued a US patent in 1938.

The accuracy of punch notching is good, depending on the care with which it's carried out. For manual folding work, prior notching can often improve resultant accuracy of the folding itself.

The speed of notching is usually limited by manual handling when loading the workpieces into the press. Pieces some feet long may be manually loaded into a single-stroke press. Smaller pieces are still generally hand-fed, limiting speeds to perhaps 100 strokes / minute.

Almost any workable metal can be notched. It's particularly suitable where the metal is otherwise awkward to drill, such as stainless steels, titanium or previously heat-treated aluminium alloys. It is an operation of removing a small part of metal sheet of desired shape from edge of metal sheet.

== Tube notching ==
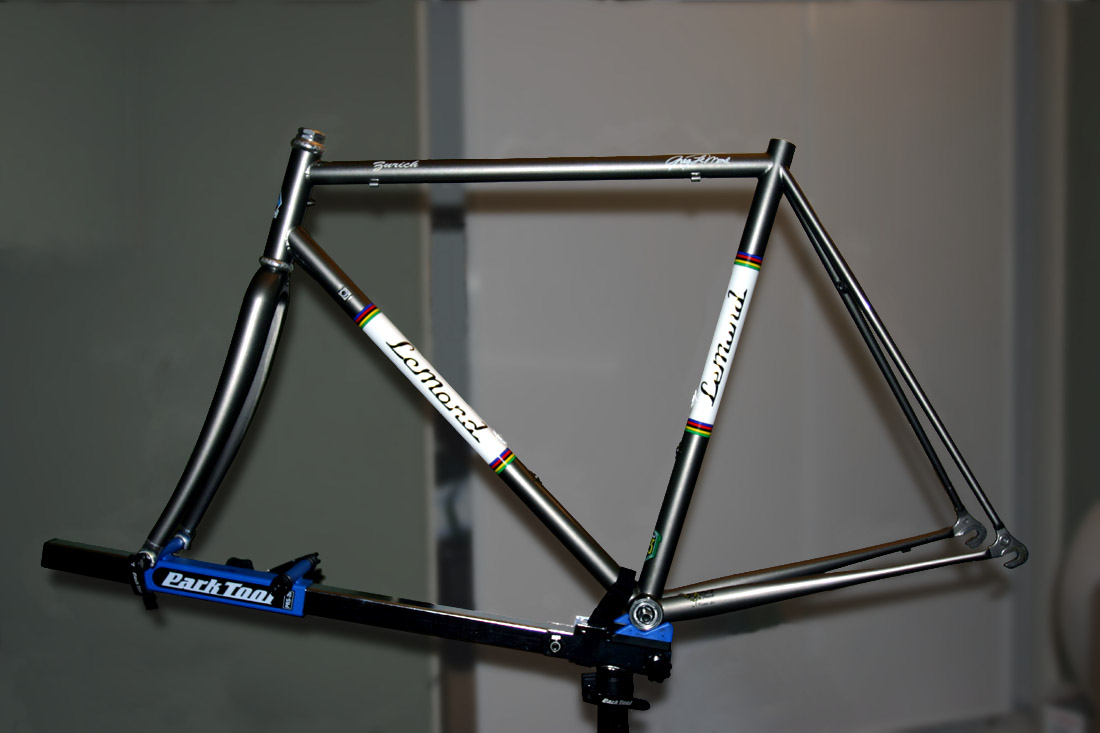
Bicycle frame in steel tube, notched at the joints before TIG welding or brazing

Tube notching is commonly performed before joining light-gauge tubes to make a tee or similar joint, as by welding. Either one or both tubes may be notched before assembly. A familiar example of tube notching is in the manufacture of bicycle frames.

End notching works the end of the tube, such as a semicircular concavity to make the base of a tee, or a convex vee to fit into a mitre.

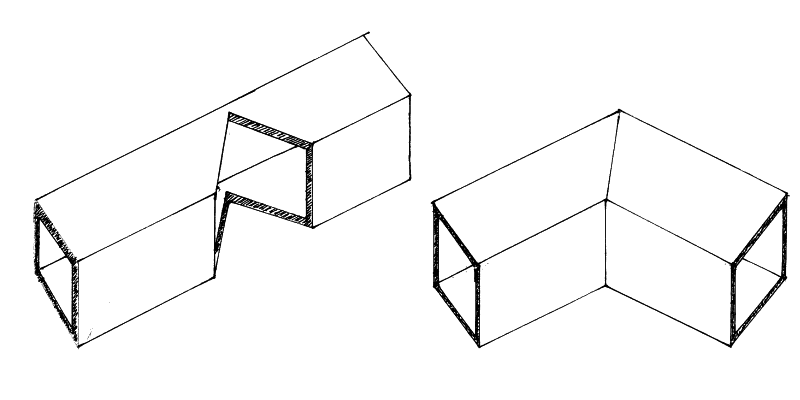
Vee-notched tube, bent for assembly of a mitred joint

Side notching (also called offset notching) works the side of a tube with a vee notch for bending, semicircular or vee notches for tee joint.

Tube being hollow, it's not practical to use a simple punch operation to notch it, as it would be squashed. Although punching is possible, it requires support mandrels and awkward handling. Where tube is worked with a punch press other than for side notching, this is generally described as slotting.

Tube notching for fabrication of circular tube is thus most commonly done with a rotary hole saw in which a hole saw of the diameter of the tube being attached to is fed into the stock to be notched at a semi-perpendicular angle. This produces a semi-circular notch. Rather than using large presses, such saw notching may only require a simple jig, also making it suitable for on-site working.

A much more accurate way of notching the end of tube stock is to use a specially made milling cutter called an end mill. The stock to be notched is clamped into a vise and can then be fed slowly and accurately into a rotating, hardened metal, end mill. This method requires more expensive equipment and lacks the portability of the hole saw method, as the machine is typically bolted for stability and safety. This method of end notching is much faster and thus greatly minimizes the chance of damaging the stock either by warping due to heat build up or by squashing as can still happen with a hole saw. Notching in thin-wall tube may also be carried out by abrasive tools, reducing some of the risk of damage from a hole saw snatching. This also allows more complex shapes to be performed, such as vee notches. In some cases, a helical end mill cutter may be used.

Computer numerical control (CNC) notching is enabling designers to work with more complex geometries.

=== Notch and bend ===
Vee notches in tube, particularly square tube, may be cut so deep as to cut almost through the tube: three sides of a square tube. This then allows torner, usually finished by welding.

On a smaller scale for jewellery making, this operation is performed by hand-filing precious-metal strip before bending and soldering to make box frames or stone mounts.
