= Braze-on =

Parts of a bicycle permanently attached to the frame

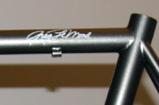
Braze-on cable stop on bottom of top tube that happens to be welded on.

A braze-on is the name for any number of parts of a bicycle that have been permanently attached to the frame. The term "braze-on" comes from when these parts would have been brazed on to steel frame bicycles. Braze-ons continue to be so-called even though they may be welded, glued, riveted, or moulded into the frame material, depending on the material itself and the connection method used elsewhere on the frame.

== Uses ==
Braze-ons include:

- Rack and mudguard/fender mounts at the dropouts, seatstays, and fork blades.
- Water bottle cage mounts.
- Cable carriers, guides, and stops.
- Pump pegs.
- Shifter bosses.
- Cantilever brake bosses.
- Chain hanger, inside the drive-side seatstay.
- Front derailleur hanger.
- Hub brake reaction arm mount. Called a Pacman braze-on if formed with a slot instead of a hole.
