= Cable guide =

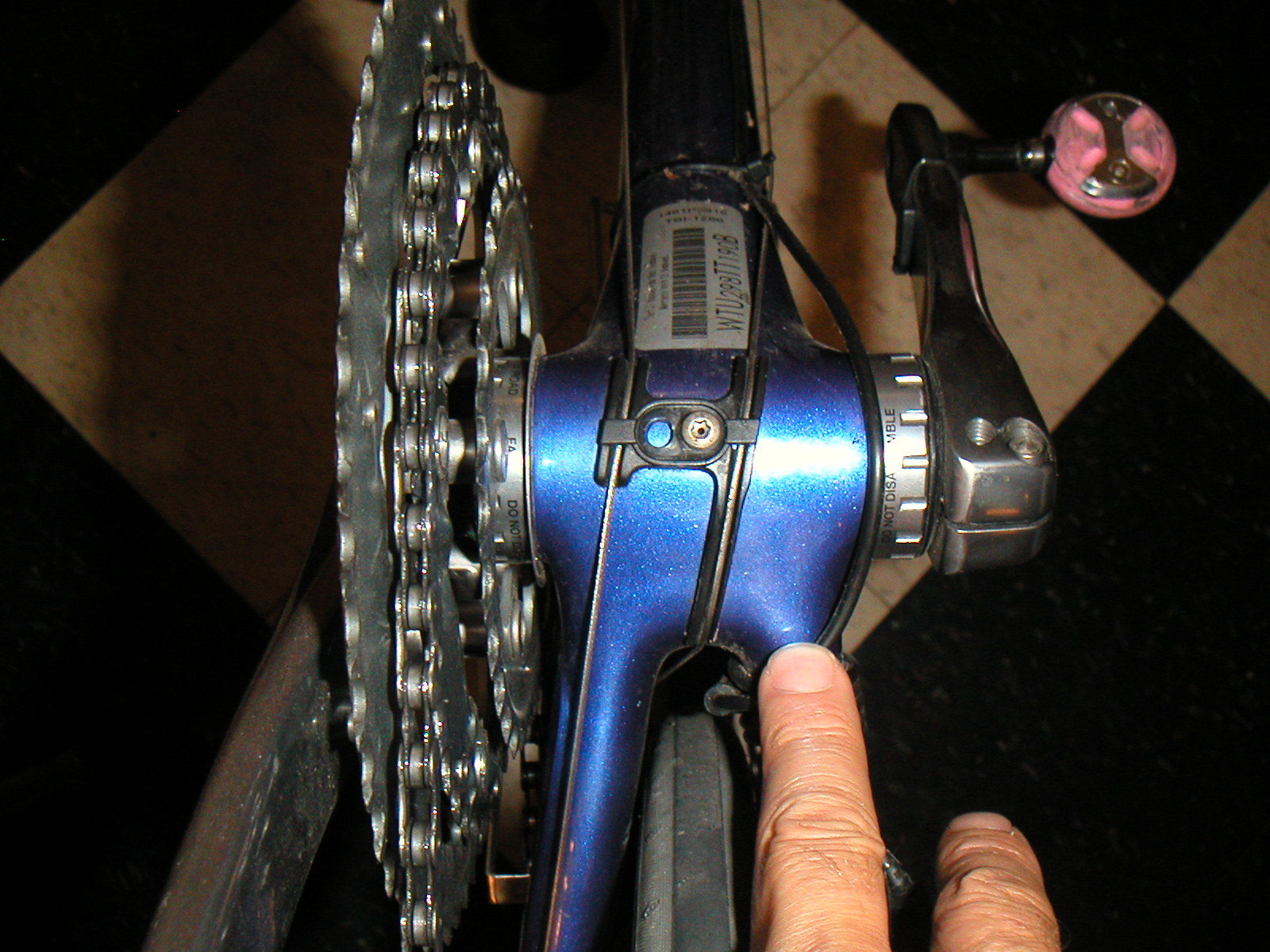
Black plastic cable guide on the bottom of a Trek 5000 bottom bracket shell

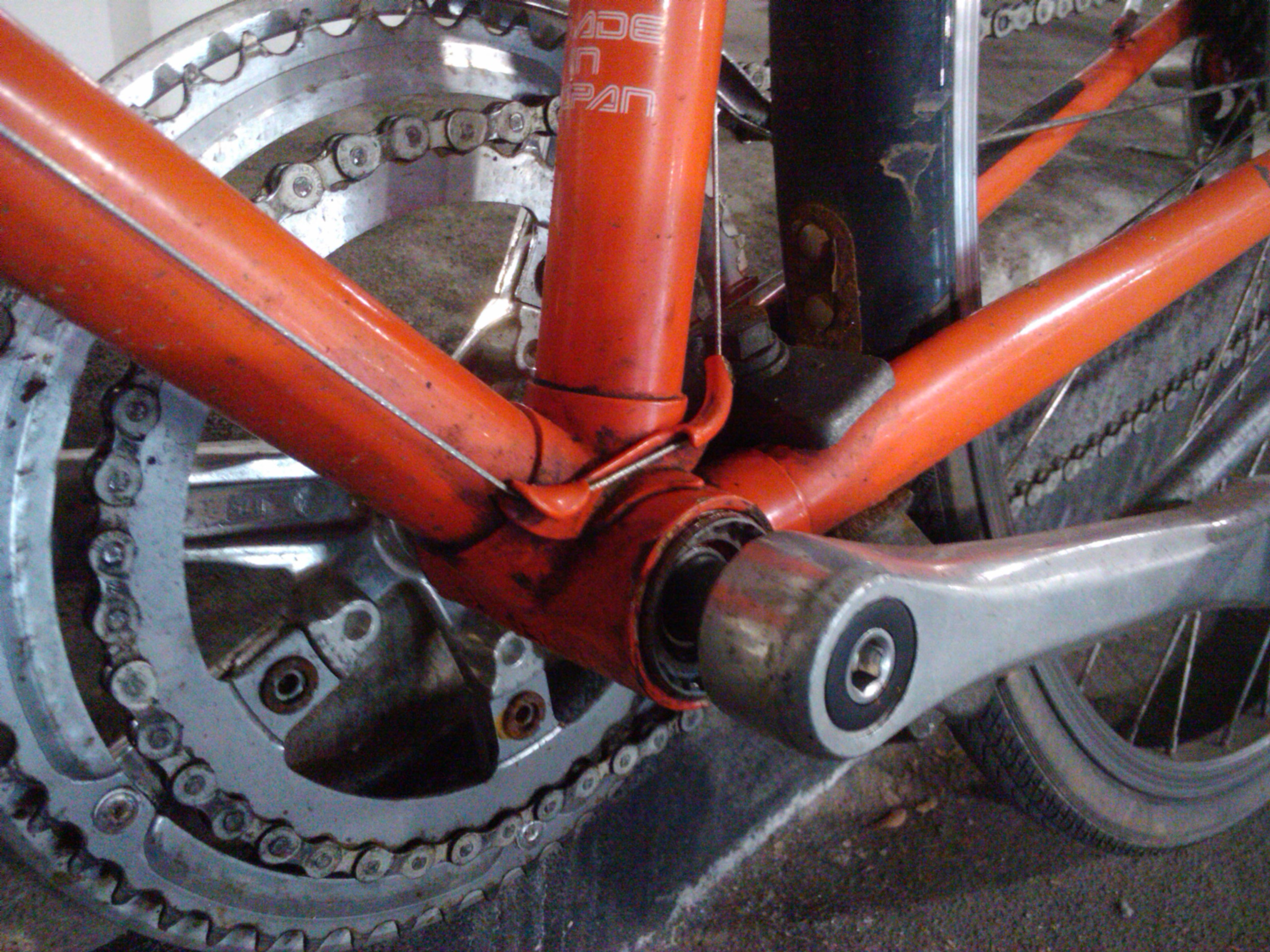
Metal, braze-on cable guide on the top of a bottom bracket shell

A cable guide is a fitting or part of a bicycle frame which guides a piece of bare inner bowden cable around a corner. Most multi-speed bicycles have cable guides to get the derailleur cables past the bottom bracket. Older derailleur bicycles used either brazed-on or clamp-on guides just above the bottom bracket, but newer bicycles have a guide under the bottom bracket.

== Below the bottom bracket ==
Cable guides below the bottom bracket can be cheaper, just a piece of moulded plastic, and, for some bikes with very small chainrings, eliminate interference between the rear derailleur cable and the bottom of the front derailleur cage. They also make for a cleaner appearance and easier to clean frame in the bottom bracket area. Poor lubrication of bottom-bracket cable guides is a common cause of auto-shifting.

== Above the bottom bracket ==
Cable guides above the bottom bracket are usually made of metal, causing more friction and wear on the cable, and is a more complex cable guide as it does not follow the shape of the bottom bracket shell.

They do allow use of a slightly shorter cable, tend to keep the cable more clean (as it is more protected from grit thrown up from the road), allow the cable to protect the chainstay from chain slap, and the loop of housing at the rear derailleur does not need to bend quite as tightly, since the cable stop is on the top side of the chainstay, rather than beneath it. Despite the advantages this routing is almost exclusively found on older bikes.

== Beside top of seat tube ==
Some bicycles use a cable guide on one side of the seat cluster for a rear cantilever brake cable, rather than use a short length of housing between two housing stops.
