= Pocket Bicycles =

Manufacturer of portable bicycles

Pocket Bicycles was the name of a manufacturer of portable bicycles located in Cambridge, Massachusetts in the 1970s.

== Design innovations ==
While resembling many of the small-wheel folding bicycle designs of the time, the bicycle was distinctive in reducing the flexion of the down tube and hinge by use of cables kept under tension by the weight of the rider, saving weight and space compared to use of rigid tubing braces. Use of cables provided reduction of excessive vertical flex in the frame while still allowing easy adjustment of the degree of flexion retained, to act as a tunable suspension system absorbing much of the bumpiness of the ride normally associated with small wheel bicycles.

== See also ==
- Bicycle frame
- Guy (sailing)
- Aeronautical wire bracing
- Stays (nautical)
