= Zipp 2001 =

Aero Dynamic Y Frame; Theory, Timeline, UCI ban & Design Perseverance

Zipp 2001 and 3001 were a line of bicycle frames, currently discontinued, made by the Zipp company. Although they have been out of production since 1997, they still have a cult following within triathlon, where they remain race-legal .

The Zipp 2001 is part of a significant advance in mid-1990s bicycle design, where new materials such as aluminum and carbon fiber allowed for new, less orthodox frame designs. Other examples include Hotta, Softride, Trek's Y-foil, and the Cheetah Cat.

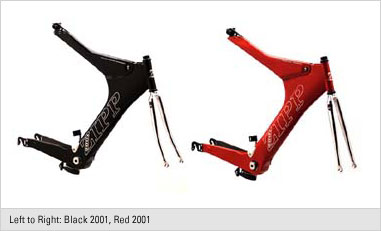
Zipp Frames in red and black

== Timeline ==
The frame that was to become the 2001 was first shown in prototype form in 1990, finalized in 1991, and entered production in 1992. The Zipp 3001 (which was a 2001 with additional boron strips stiffening the carbon fiber) was released in 1997. In 1998, the UCI announced that all non-double triangle frames would be illegal for road racing starting in January 2000. This led Zipp to discontinue production at the end of 1997.

The existing component inventory was sold to one of the men who had worked on frame production, and the frames have not been produced since then.

== Current Status ==
Since January 2000, Zipps have not been legal for use in road racing, or UCI-organized time trials. They are, however, legal in triathlons, which have much more liberal equipment rules. While they are known for being flexible and, therefore, not well suited to hill climbing, they are well suited to flatter courses.
