= Campagnolo (disambiguation) =

Campagnolo may refer to:

- Campagnolo, Italian manufacturer of high-end bicycle components with headquarters in Vicenza, Italy
- Gitane–Campagnolo, French professional cycling team that existed from 1969 to 1977
- Campagnolo ErgoPower, integrated gearshift and brake lever system designed by Campagnolo for racing bicycles

== Persons ==
- Ana Caroline Campagnolo, Brazilian politician, author, lecturer and historian
- Andrea Campagnolo, Italian football goalkeeper
- Iona Campagnolo, Canadian politician
- Luisa Vania Campagnolo, Italian luthier
- Tullio Campagnolo, Italian racing cyclist, inventor, founder of the bicycle component company

== See also ==
- Campagna (disambiguation)
- Campagnola (disambiguation)
- Campagnoli (disambiguation)
