= Campagnola =

Campagnola may refer to:

- Campagnola Cremasca, municipality in the Province of Cremona in the Italian region Lombardy
- Campagnola Emilia, municipality in the Province of Reggio Emilia in the Italian region Emilia-Romagna
- Fiat Campagnola, heavy-duty off-road vehicle produced by Fiat
- Iveco Campagnola, utility 4×4 vehicle produced by Iveco
- Domenico Campagnola, Italian painter and printmaker in engraving and woodcut of the Venetian Renaissance
- Giulio Campagnola, Italian engraver and painter

== See also ==
- Campagna (disambiguation)
- Campagnoli (disambiguation)
- Campagnolo (disambiguation)
