= Campania (disambiguation) =

Campania is a region of southern Italy.

Campania may also refer to:

== Places ==
=== Canada ===
- Campania Island, British Columbia
- Campania Sound, British Columbia
- Campania, a village in Amaranth, Ontario

=== Italy ===
- Ancient Campania, the territory of the ancient city of Capua
- Campania (Catholic ecclesiastical region)

=== Other countries ===
- Campania, Tasmania, a township in Australia
- Campania, Georgia, a place in Georgia, U.S.
- Chalastra, formerly Campania, a town in Greece
- Campine, a region in Belgium and the Netherlands, the Latin and original name being Campania

== Ships ==
- Campania-class cruiser, in the Italian Regia Marina 1917–1937
  - Italian cruiser Campania, lead ship of the class
- HMS Campania, two ships
- RMS Campania, a British ocean liner owned by the Cunard Line
- MV Norstar, a roll-on/roll-off ferry later sold and renamed SNAV Campania

== Other ==
- Fairey Campania, a British patrol aircraft of the First World War
- 377 Campania, a main-belt asteroid

== See also ==
- Campagna (disambiguation)
- Champagne (disambiguation)
- Latium et Campania, a regio in Roman Italy
