= Campagna V13R =

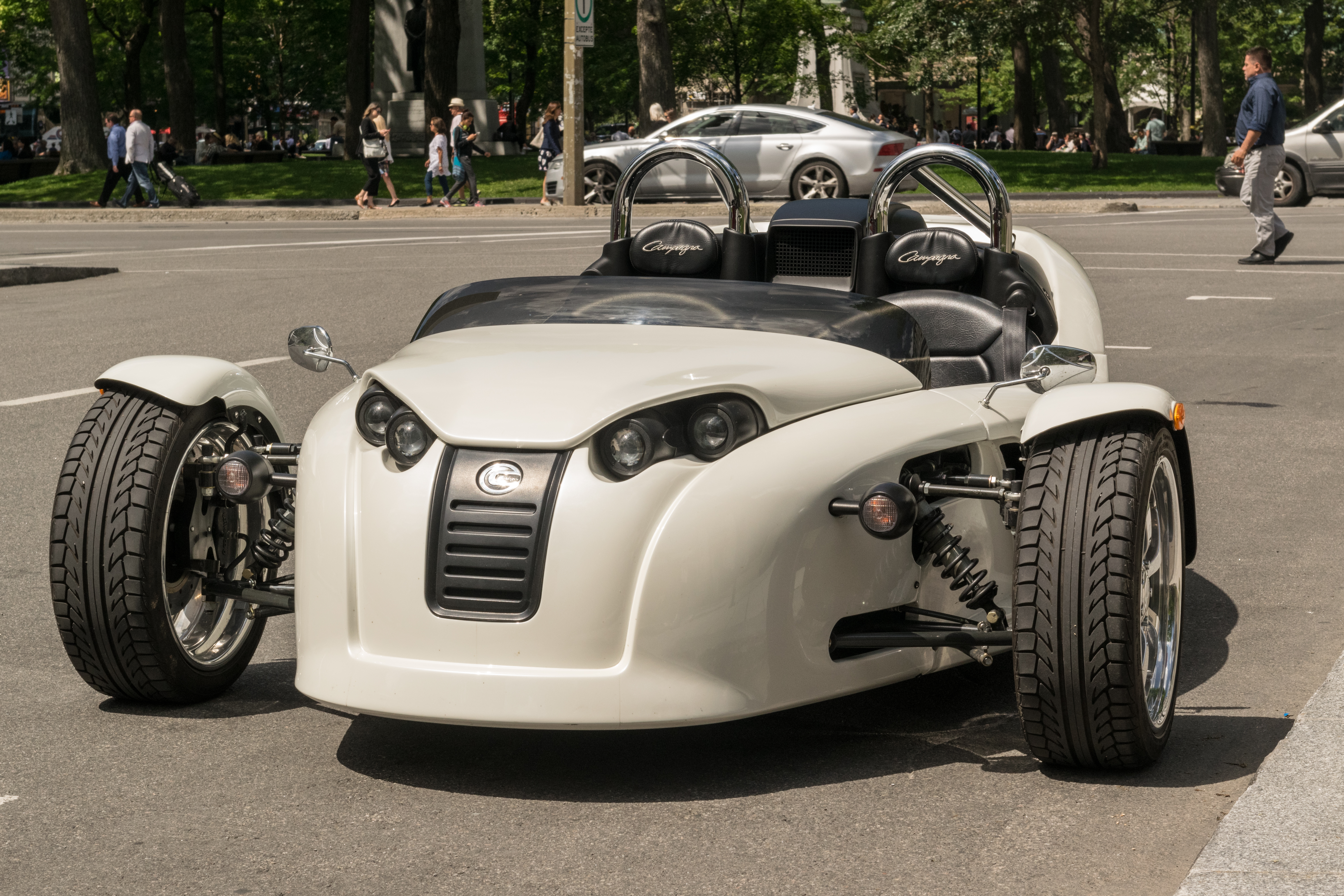
- Manufacturer: Campagna Motors
- Production: Since 2008
- Assembly: Boucherville, Quebec
- Engine: 1,250 cc (76 cu in)
- Power: 122HP
- Torque: 84 lb-ft
- Transmission: 6-speed sequential manual
- Wheelbase: 2,477 mm (97.5 in)
- Dimensions: L: 3,530 mm (139 in); W: 1,994 mm (78.5 in); H: 1,067 mm (42.0 in)

The Campagna V13R is a two-seat, three-wheeled motor vehicle produced by Campagna Motors since 2008.

== History ==
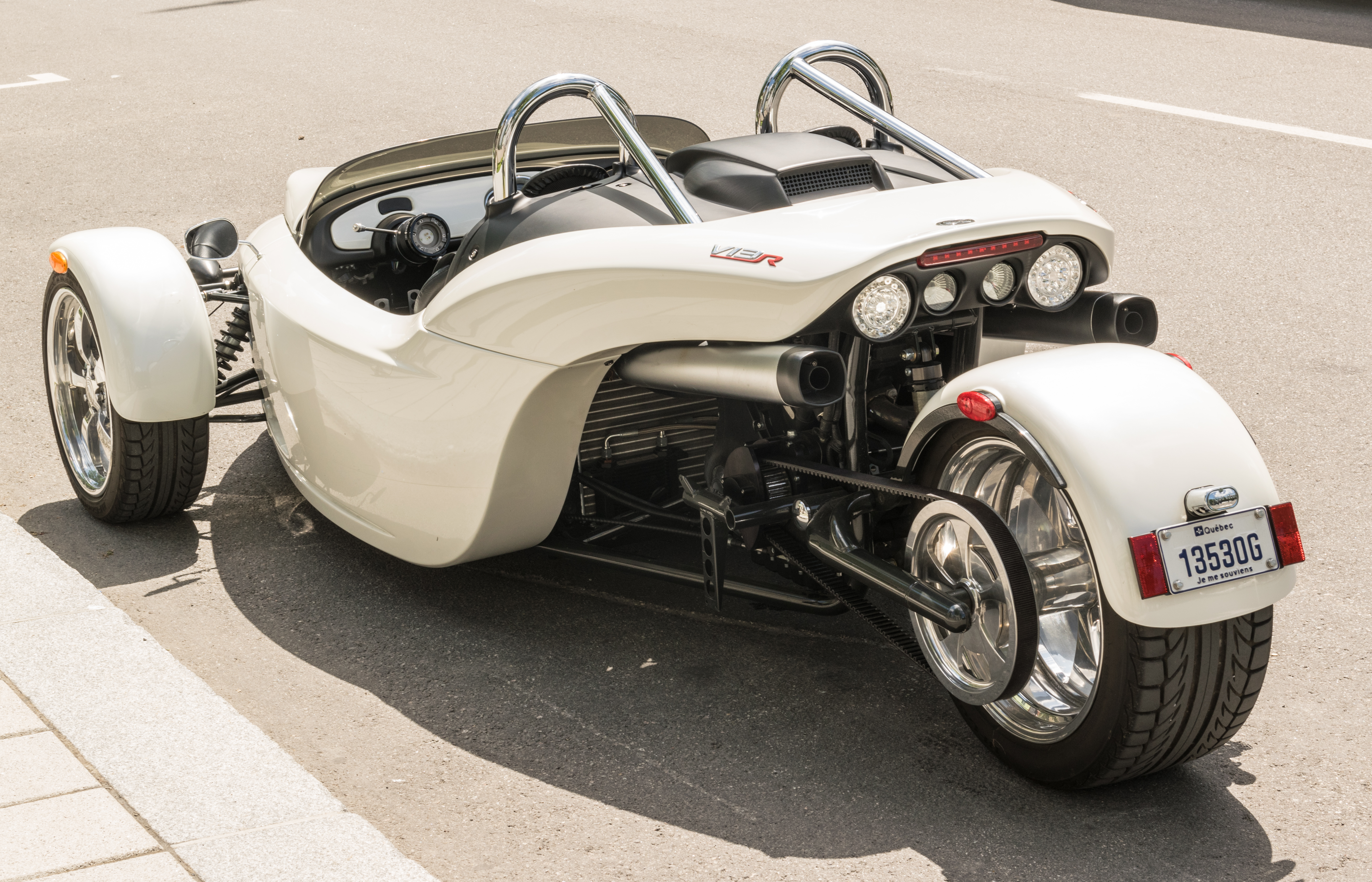
Campagna V13R

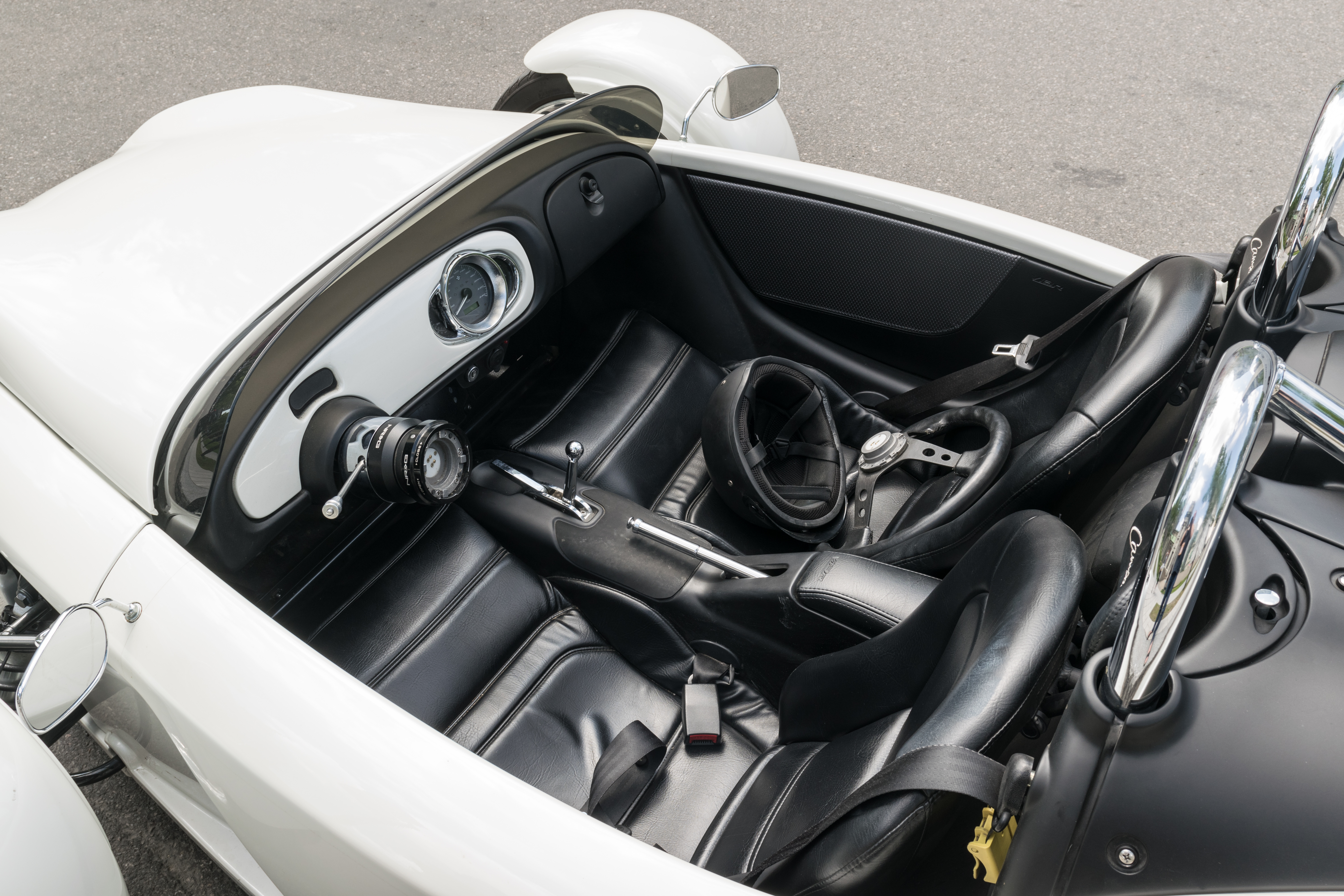
Campagna V13R Aero 3S

The V13R model expanded Campagna's portfolio right after the resumption of operations, which was provided by the entrepreneurs in 2008 in response to the declaration of bankruptcy by the current owners. Like the Campagna T-Rex, the vehicle took the form of a three-wheeler combining the features of a light sports car with an open body and a motorcycle.

The passenger cabin accommodated two passengers with dedicated bucket seats, and, as in the case of the Campagna T-Rex model, a steering wheel and pedals closer to those of cars were used to control the vehicle using motorcycle components, and, in contrast, clocks provided by Harley-Davidson. The cockpit has been adapted to driving in the rain thanks to its water resistance.

The drive unit was provided by Harley-Davidson. Transmitting power to a single rear wheel, it developed a power of 122 hp (91 kW) and 84 lb⋅ft (114 N⋅m) of maximum torque, offering acceleration from 0 to 100 km/h (62 mph) in 4.5 seconds.

The V13R went on sale immediately after its premiere in 2008, both on the domestic Canadian market and in foreign markets, specifically the neighboring United States.

== See also ==
- List of motorized trikes
