= Aero 3S =

Aero 3s
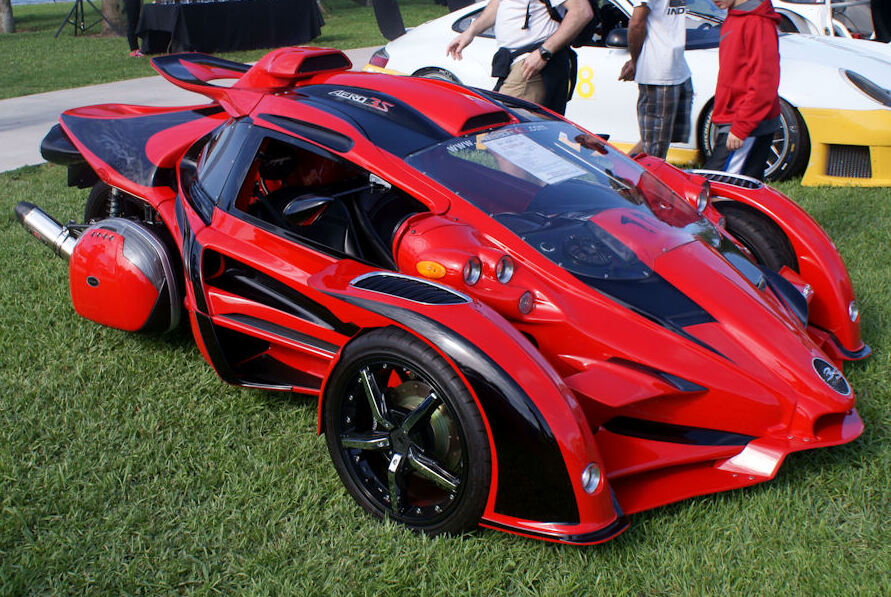

Overview
- Production: 2006–present
- Designer: Hani Harouche

The Aero 3s is an out of production motorized tricycle body kit add-on introduced by Anibal Automotive Design of Canada in 2006. It is a re-bodied and more aerodynamic version of the Campagna T-Rex. The new body incorporates some features not seen on the T-Rex, such as Lamborghini-style opening scissor doors, side windows, and "an array of phantasmogorical spoilers". The full fibreglass body kit (unpainted) retails at $8,500 USD as of 2018, to which must be added the cost of the host T-Rex.

The body was designed by Hani Harouche, who explains that "I called it the Aero 3S, aero for the more aerodynamic shape [than the T-Rex], and 3S for the three seasons you can actually drive it [in Canada]."
