= Croce d'Aune =

Coordinates: 46.062°N 11.830°E

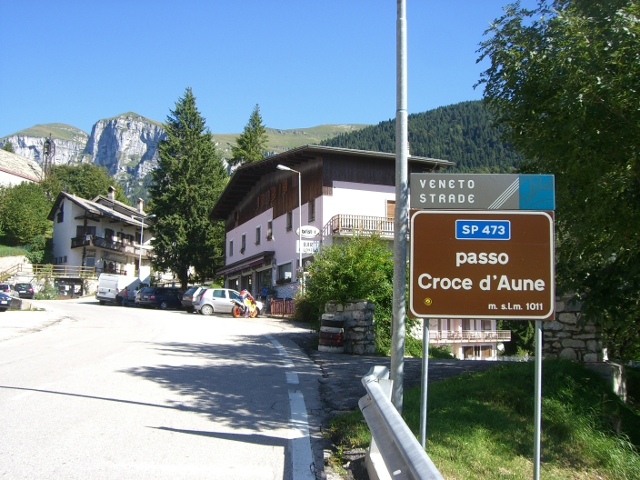
- Signage at the pass
- Interactive map of Croce d'Aune
- Elevation: 1,015 metres (3,330 ft)

Third Approach
- Location: Belluno

The Croce d'Aune is a mountain pass in the Italian Dolomites, 1,015 metres (3,330 ft) above sea level, between Aune and Pedavena in Belluno Province.

It became famous as the place where Tullio Campagnolo, while trying and failing to remove the rear wheel of his bicycle, invented the quick release skewer.
