= Campagna (disambiguation) =

Campagna is a town in the Campania region of southern Italy.

Campagna also may refer to:

People

- Girolamo Campagna (1552-1623 or 1625), sculptor
- Louis Campagna (1900–1955), criminal
- Richard Campagna, politician
- Sam Campagna (born 1980), football player

Places

- Campagna Lupia, a town in northeast Italy
- Campagna-de-Sault, a commune in southern France
- Roman Campagna, an area in central Italy

== See also ==
- Campagna Motors, a Canadian company
  - Campagna T-Rex, a motorcycle made by Campagna Motors
- National Congress Battalions, also known as the Truppe di Campagna
- Campania (disambiguation)
