= Fork end =

Part of a bicycle

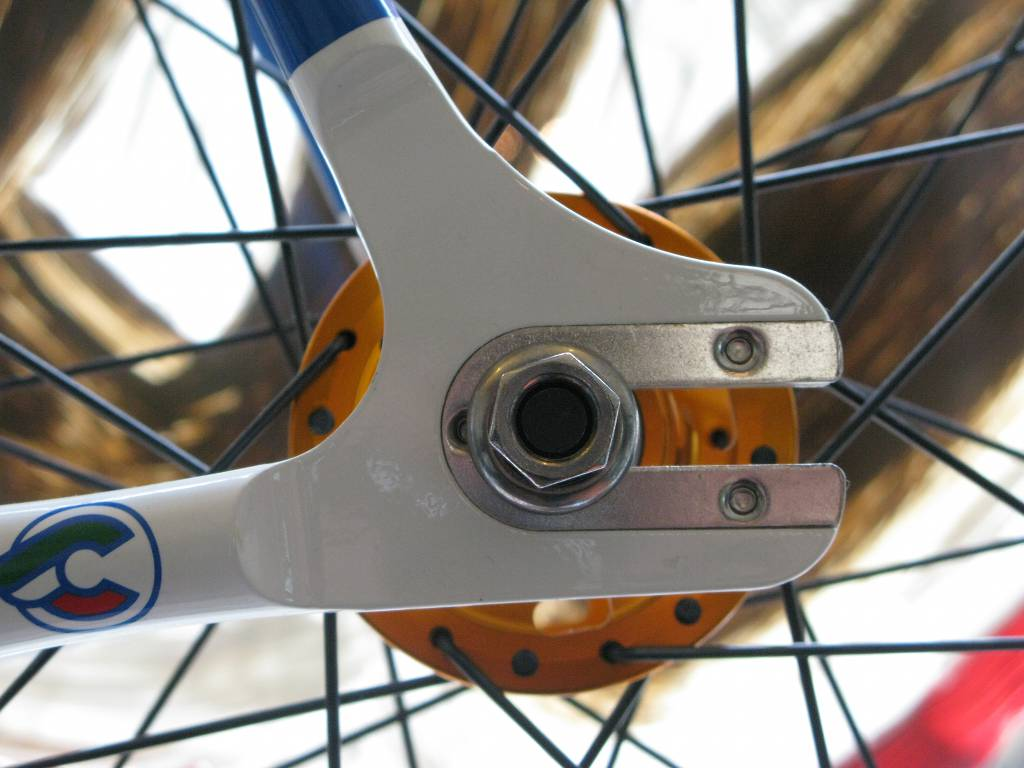
Horizontal rearward-facing track fork end (not a dropout)

A fork end, fork-end, or forkend is a slot in a bicycle frame or bicycle fork where the axle of a bicycle wheel is attached. A dropout is a type of fork end that allows the rear wheel to be removed without first derailing the chain.

Track bicycle frames have track fork ends, on which the opening faces rearwards. Because they do not have dropouts, the chain must be derailed from the sprocket before the rear wheel can be removed from a typical track bike. Some single-speed bicycles intended for street or trail use are also equipped with track fork ends instead of dropouts.

On bicycles that do not have a derailleur or other chain tensioning device, rear horizontal dropouts allow adjustment of chain tension, and can accommodate a range of chain lengths or cog sizes. They were standard on most older derailleur bicycles from before the 1990s. An older derailleur-equipped bicycle with horizontal dropouts can be readily converted into singlespeed, fixed gear or to use an internally geared hub.

Rear vertical dropouts have the slot facing downwards. The advantage is that the wheel axle cannot slip forward compared with horizontal dropouts. The disadvantage is that on a bicycle without a rear derailleur but with vertical dropouts, the chain tension cannot be adjusted by moving the wheel forwards or backwards, and needs another means of chain-tensioning, by a derailleur, chain tensioner, or eccentric bottom bracket or rear hub. Fixed wheel bicycles cannot use any form of chain tensioning device, because the lower run of chain is pulled very tight when using the transmission as a brake.

In general, a modern bicycle frame intended for derailleur gears will have a vertical dropout, while one designed for singlespeed or hub gears will have horizontal dropouts or track fork ends.

== Features ==
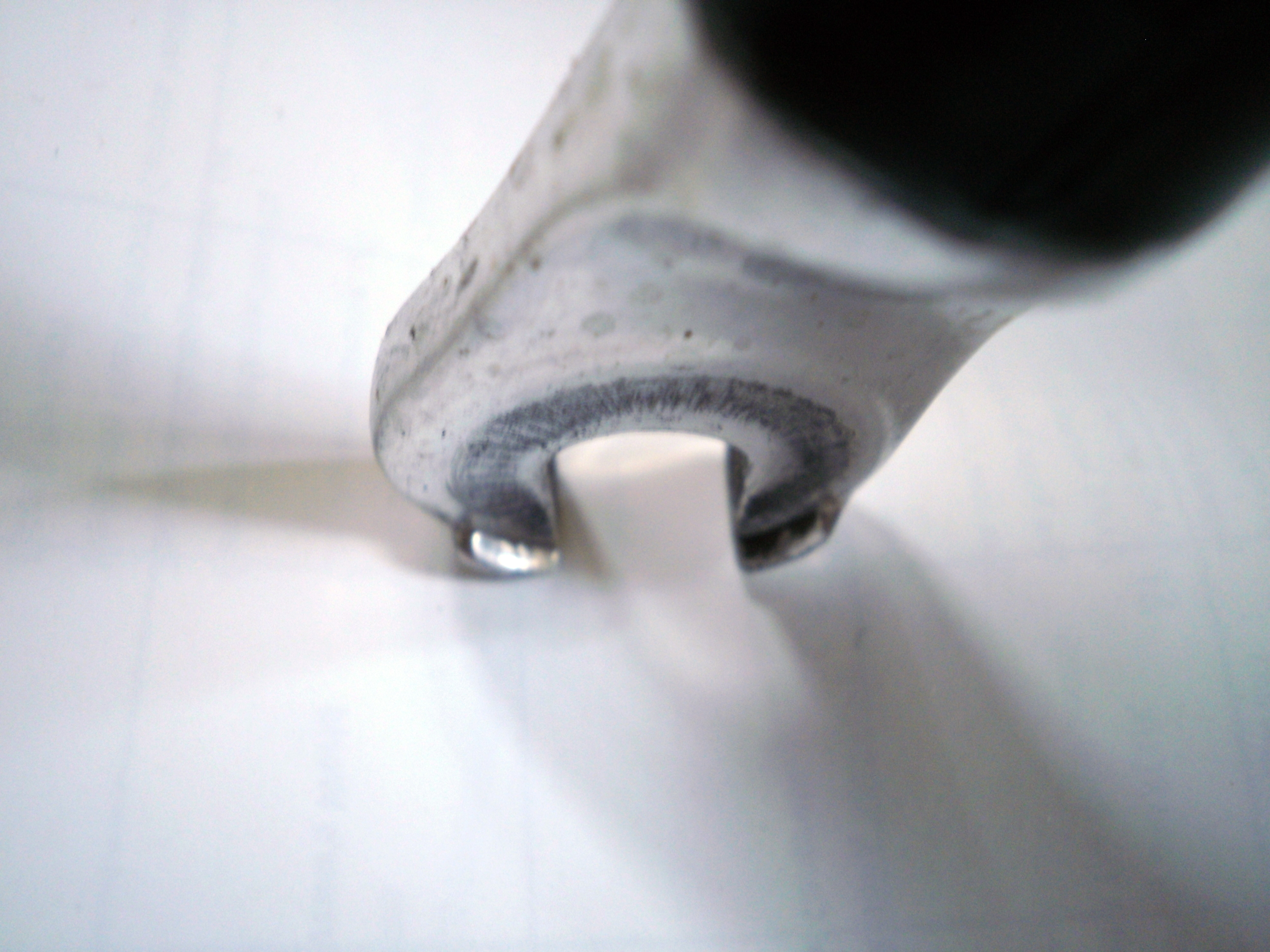
Lawyer lips on a front fork end (not a dropout)

=== Lawyer lips ===
Lawyer lips or lawyer tabs (a type of positive retention device) are tabs fitted to the fork ends on the front fork of bicycles to prevent a wheel from leaving the fork if the quick release skewer comes undone. Lawyer lips were introduced in the 1970s and are designed to compensate for user error in the operation of quick release skewers.

A side effect is that the quick release, which was developed to allow the wheel to be removed without having to unscrew any components, no longer works as designed: the skewer must be unscrewed in order to remove the wheel (although tools do remain unnecessary). This means that the tension on refitting must be adjusted again. Some cyclists file off the lawyer tabs, so the quick release works as originally intended.

A correctly secured quick release is unlikely to be ejected from the fork end in normal use where rim brakes are in use, although the moments in disc brake systems can cause quick-release front wheels to be ejected past the lawyer tabs. A solution to ejection risk would involve mounting the front disc brake calliper in front of the fork blade rather than behind, as the reaction force on the disc would then be into, rather than out of, the fork-end. The widespread adoption of through-axles in modern bikes was partly driven by the transition to disc brakes.

=== Eyelets ===
Fork ends and dropouts may support one or more eyelets, small protruding tabs with holes, often threaded, to facilitate the mounting of racks and fenders.

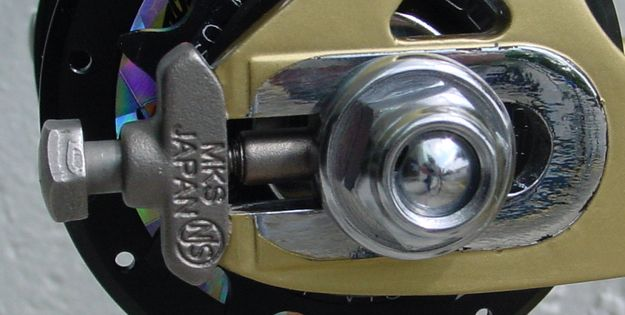
Mikashima Chaintug on a Keirin bicycle

=== Chaintugs ===
Some rear track fork ends have threaded devices ("chaintugs") to aid in setting the proper chain tension. These may be integral to the fork end or separate items. They work by holding the rear axle in an eye at the end of a threaded bolt. The bolt passes through a cap which fits over the open fork end. Tightening the bolts on each side causes the axle to be pulled backwards towards the open fork end, tensing the chain. Chaintugs can also solve the problem of "axle creep" on hard-ridden fixed-gear bicycles, especially those with hard chromed fork ends, which may not offer adequate grip for the serrated track nuts.

=== Derailleur hanger ===
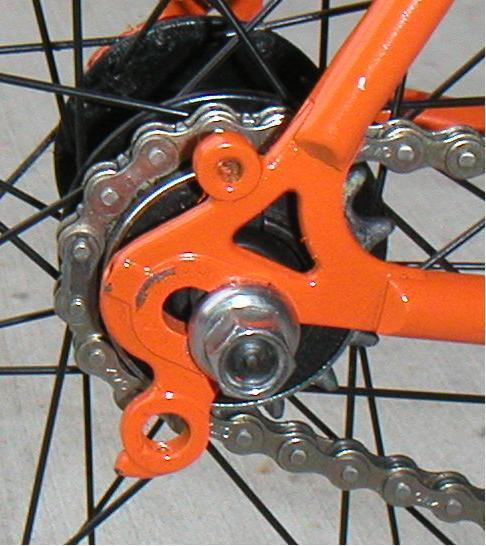
A semi-horizontal dropout on a steel frame road bicycle converted to a single-speed. The non-replaceable derailleur hanger (below the axle) and an eyelet (above the axle) for mounting a fender or rack are now unused.

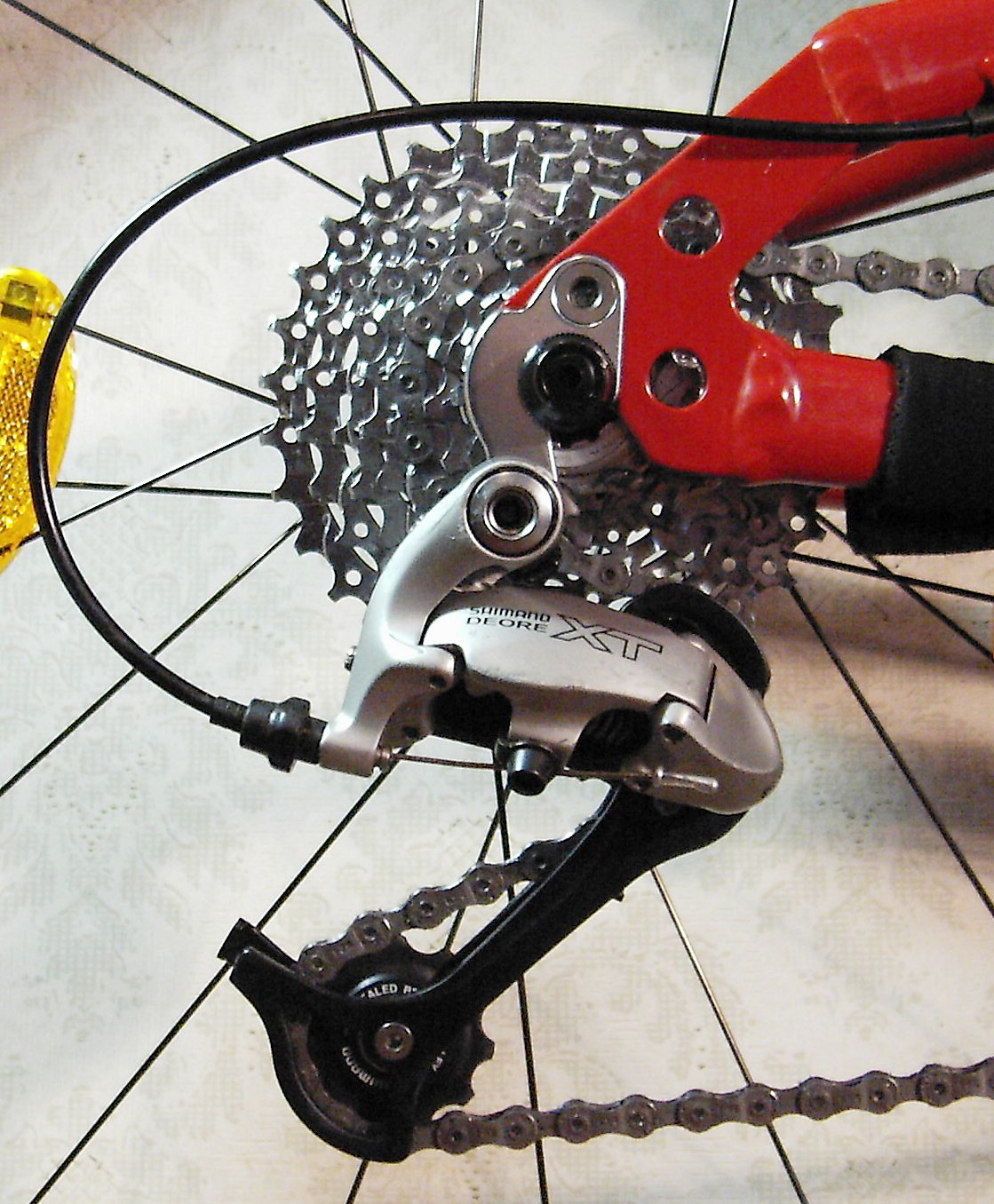
A vertical dropout on an aluminum frame mountain bike. The silver part is the replaceable derailleur hanger.

The derailleur hanger or mech hanger is the part of the dropout that the rear derailleur attaches to.

Most non-steel framed bikes have a separate removable derailleur hanger, generally made from aluminium which is bolted to the dropout. These are intended as a cheap replaceable part so that in the event of an accident or mechanical problem that could damage the derailleur or frame, the derailleur hanger breaks or deforms instead. Sometimes a shear bolt which is designed as a weak point will also be used. There are dozens of different derailleur hangers available, and one model is seldom interchangeable with another.

Because of huge variety, derailleur hangers can be classified:

1. By number of fitting fasteners: no fitting fasteners, 1 fastener, 2 fastener, 3+ and so on;
2. By mounting side: inner, outer, clam/fork or others;
3. By derailleur mounting type: standard mount, standard with adapter/extender or direct mount;
4. By axle type: 12 mm thru axle, 5 mm QR or others.

In general, steel-framed bikes do not have a removable derailleur hanger, because a steel dropout and hanger is stronger and therefore less likely to be damaged, and also it is more malleable and less likely to work harden during deformation and generally can be bent back into shape without breaking.

The derailleur hanger must be aligned correctly for proper indexed shifting, with the rear derailleur bolt hole and the rear axle close to parallel. If it is out of alignment, the rear derailleur will not move far enough, with respect to the rear sprockets, with each click. A special tool exists to measure and correct misaligned hangers.

On frames with no derailleur hanger, a direct mount derailleur or derailleur with a hanger plate is used. These only fit bikes with horizontal dropouts and are held in place by a small bolt and the rear wheel axle. These have now been effectively superseded by the derailleur hanger. Since a derailleur designed to be fitted to a separate hanger will be aligned lower on the bike than one that bolts directly onto the frame, it follows that a derailleur must be selected firstly with the mounting method in mind.

In 2019, SRAM introduced the universal derailleur hanger (UDH) as an attempt at standardizing modern thru-axle specific hangers. Some notable features are that it is designed to prevent the chain from falling off the smallest cog, and the hanger can rotate backwards in the event it hits something in order to protect the frame and derailleur. The UDH design is an openly available standard, but to use it manufacturers need to obtain a free license from SRAM. UDH hangers have been incorporated by many major bicycle manufacturers, including select models from BMC, Canyon, Cervelo, Specialized and Trek. UDH hangers are compatible with rear derailleurs from most major brands, such as SRAM, Shimano and Campagnolo. SRAM has also released a special derailleur dubbed 'Transmission' which does not attach to a hanger, but instead directly fits in a UDH-ready frame, and hence is "UDH only".

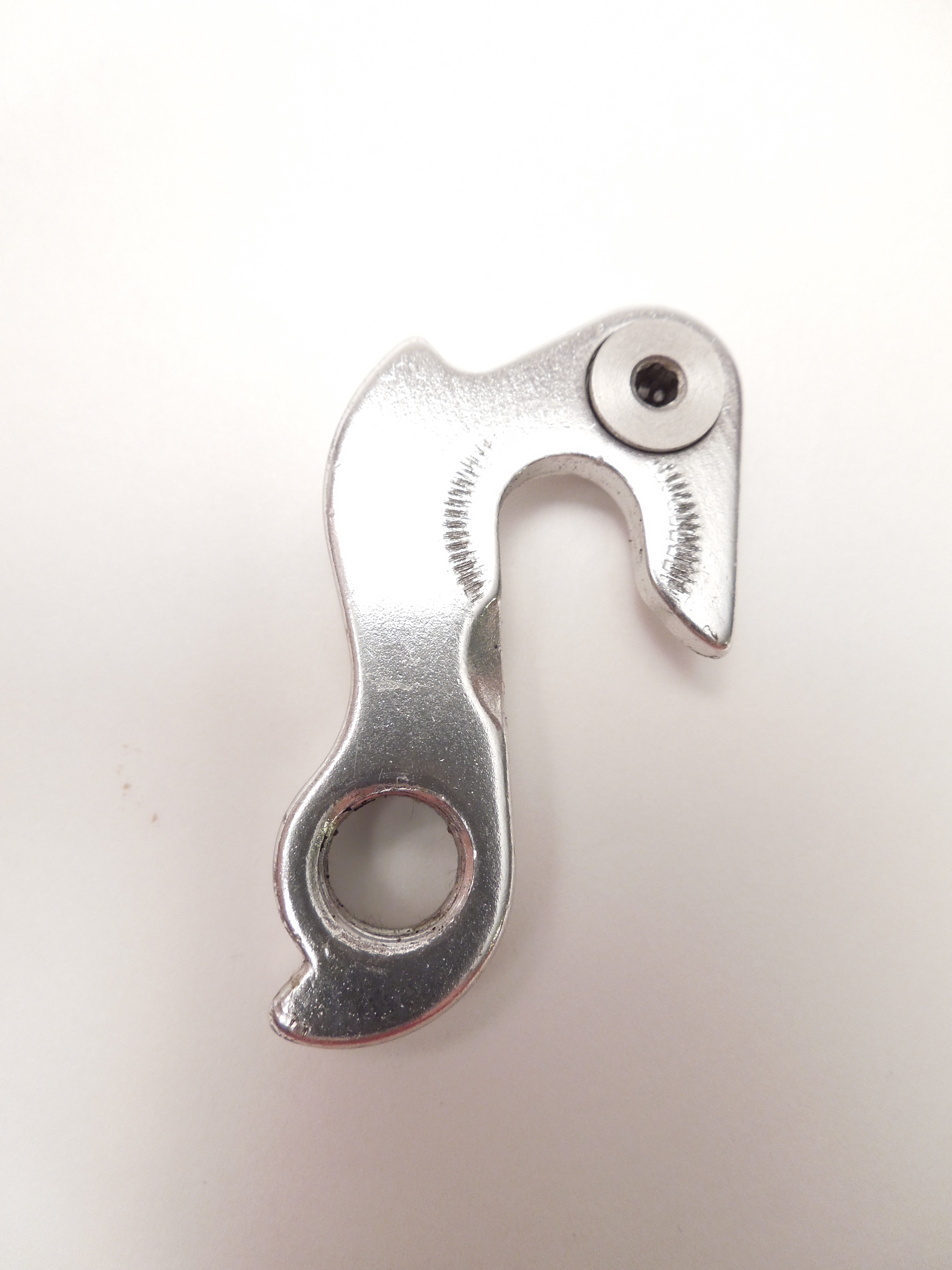
Replaceable derailleur hanger

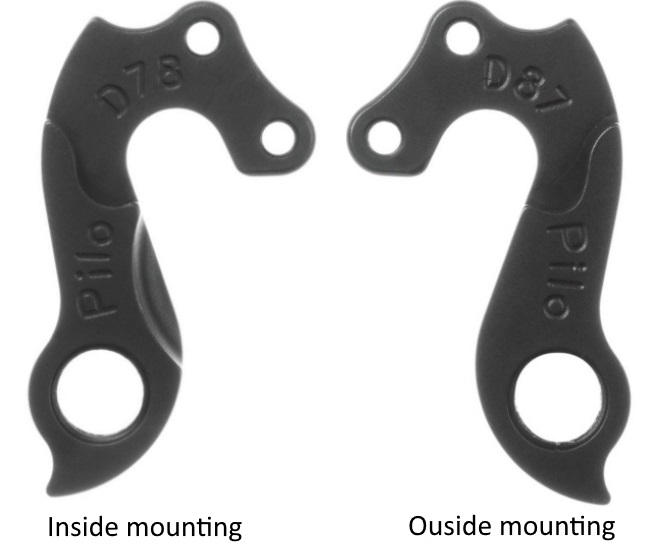
Derailleur hanger types: inner mount vs outside mount

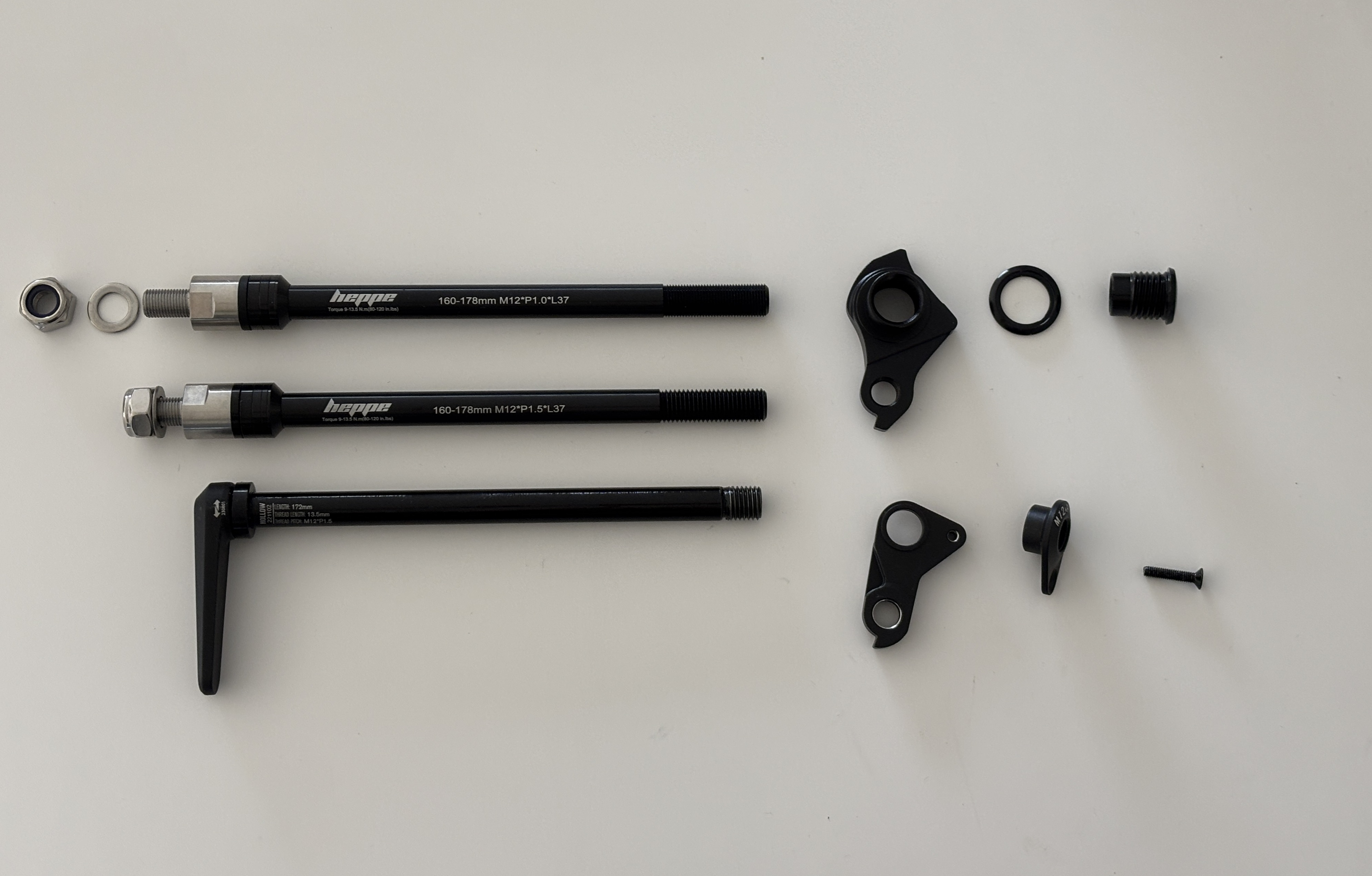
Three M12 through-axles. Top: 1 mm pitch axle for bicycle trailer shown with a universal derailleur hanger (UDH). Bottom: 1.5 mm pitch axle shown with a pre-UDH derailleur hanger

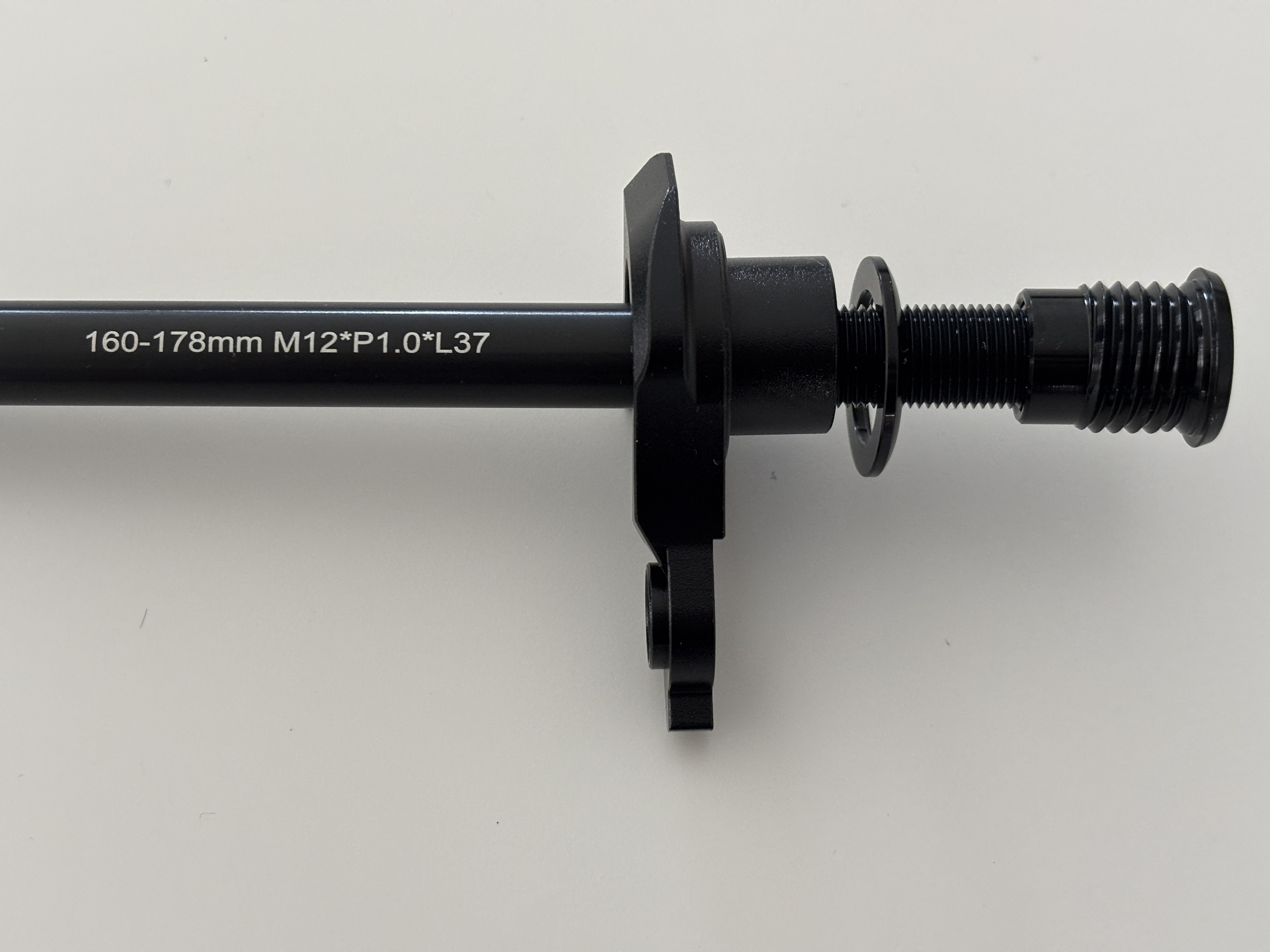
UDH hanger and screw

=== Adjustment screws ===
Some rear, horizontal, forward-facing dropouts have small adjustment screws threaded through the very rear to aid in positioning the axle precisely. The screws may be fitted with springs to keep them from moving. The most common screw size for the adjustment screws is M3.
