= Tullio Campagnolo =

Italian cyclist and inventor

Gentullio Campagnolo (26 August 1901 – 3 February 1983) was an Italian racing cyclist and inventor who patented the quick release skewer, as well as founder of the bicycle component company Campagnolo.

Many professional cyclists have used Campagnolo components, including Fausto Coppi, Gino Bartali, Eddy Merckx (Merckx was a close friend of Campagnolo and became an iconic symbol of the company), Bernard Hinault, Greg LeMond, Miguel Indurain and Philippe Gilbert.

== Background ==
Campagnolo was born in Vicenza, Italy in 1901 to a middle-class family, and began his tinkering of inventions at his father's hardware store. In 1922 Campagnolo began his amateur cycling career. He was an avid cyclist riding many races, such as the Giro di Lombardia, Milan–San Remo, and several Olympic heats.

While racing through the Italian Dolomites on 11 November 1927, in freezing weather and snow, Campagnolo lost the race due to a wingnut he could not remove to change gears. The title that was lost at the Croce d'Aune pass encouraged Campagnolo to develop the quick release wheel locking mechanism. This quick release skewer, which is in use today, enables a bicycle wheel to be removed and reattached quickly, and was the first of his many inventions from his father's Vicenza workshop for which he is known.

== Inventions ==
During his life Tullio Campagnolo applied for many patents, and many design registrations (some of these were not in the field of bicycles, or bicycle parts). His designs were extremely influential, and very widely copied. Several companies produced items that were nearly identical in design, but consumers preferred the original as a status symbol, and as a guarantee of quality. In 1930, he patented the cam mechanism quick-release skewer that became the standard for the industry. In 1933, the first quick release hubs were produced by Campagnolo. Also in 1933, he patented the sliding hub, dual seatstay rod-operated, back-pedal derailleur, ultimately known as the 'Cambio Corsa'. In 1949, he introduced the 'Gran Sport' twin-cable, parallelogram rear derailleur at the Milan trade show, the first modern derailleur.

Campagnolo was also an innovator in materials engineering for bicycle component design. In 1961, Campagnolo was the first to produce components using low-pressure magnesium casting and he used new aluminum alloys and titanium. In 1966, he patented the Campagnolo self-centering wine-bottle opener.

== Legacy ==
Campagnolo died in 1983, just after the introduction of the Gruppo del Cinquantenario (50th anniversary Campagnolo groupset). The groupset was mostly made from high-grade aluminium, and had special gold-coloured parts, to distinguish it from the standard production groupsets. Gruppo Number 0002 was presented to Pope John Paul II in a private audience for a delegation of Italian cycling enthusiasts later that year. To mark the 80th year of the Campagnolo company, a special groupset was produced, in a limited production run. This was mostly black-coloured, and partly made from carbon fibre material.

== In popular culture ==
"Tullio" is the name of an instrumental song by jazz fusion guitarist Allan Holdsworth from his 1993 studio album Hard Hat Area. Holdsworth himself was a cycling enthusiast.
