= Bicycle trailer =

Cargo accessory for bicycles

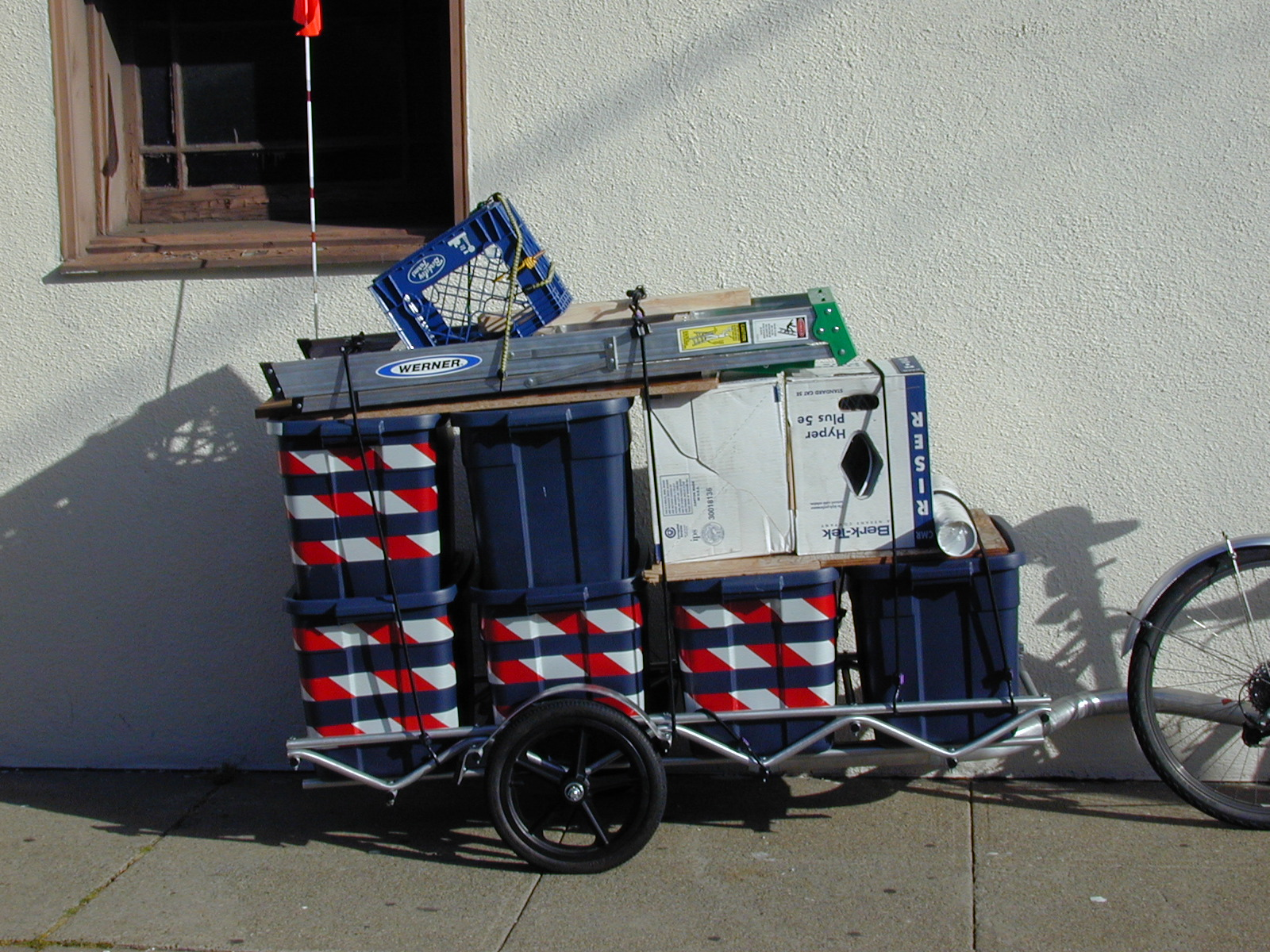
Two-wheel truss-frame trailer

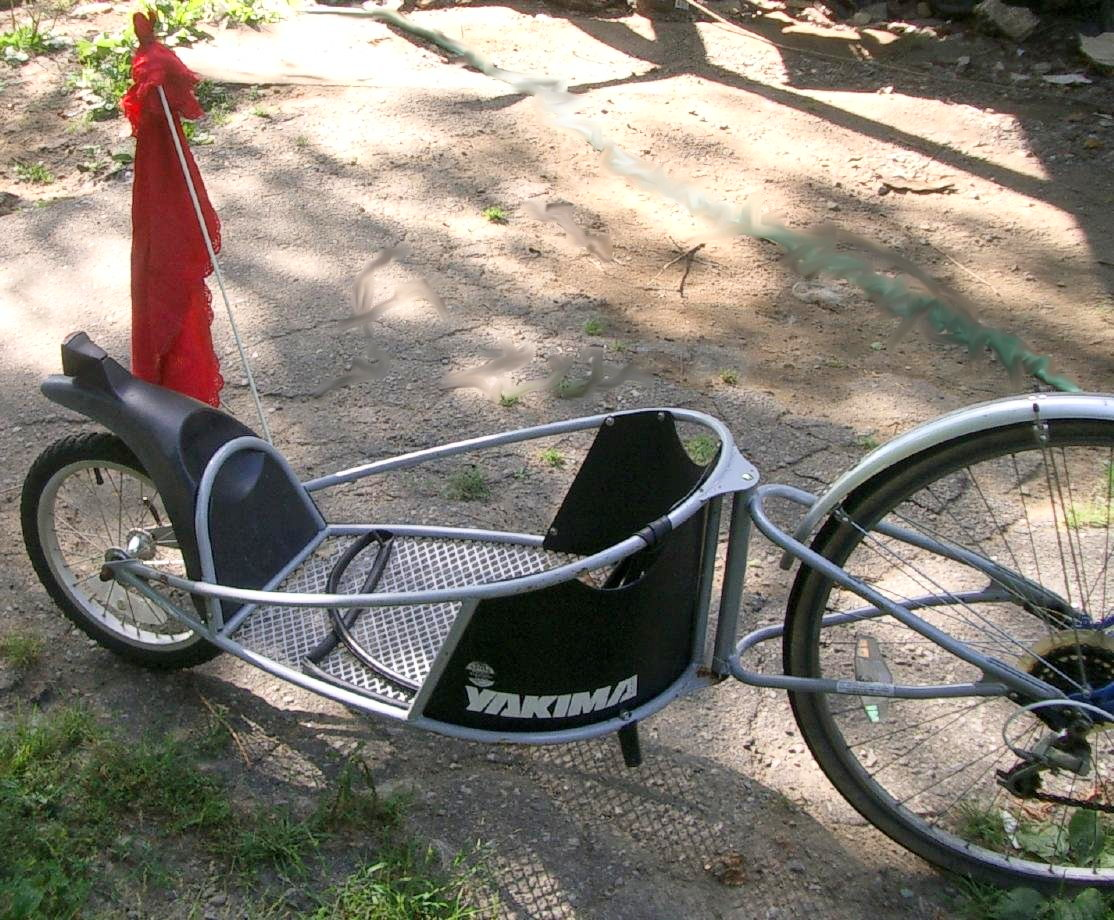
Single-wheel trailer

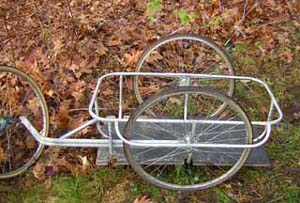
Two-wheel trailer

Wooden bicycle trailer

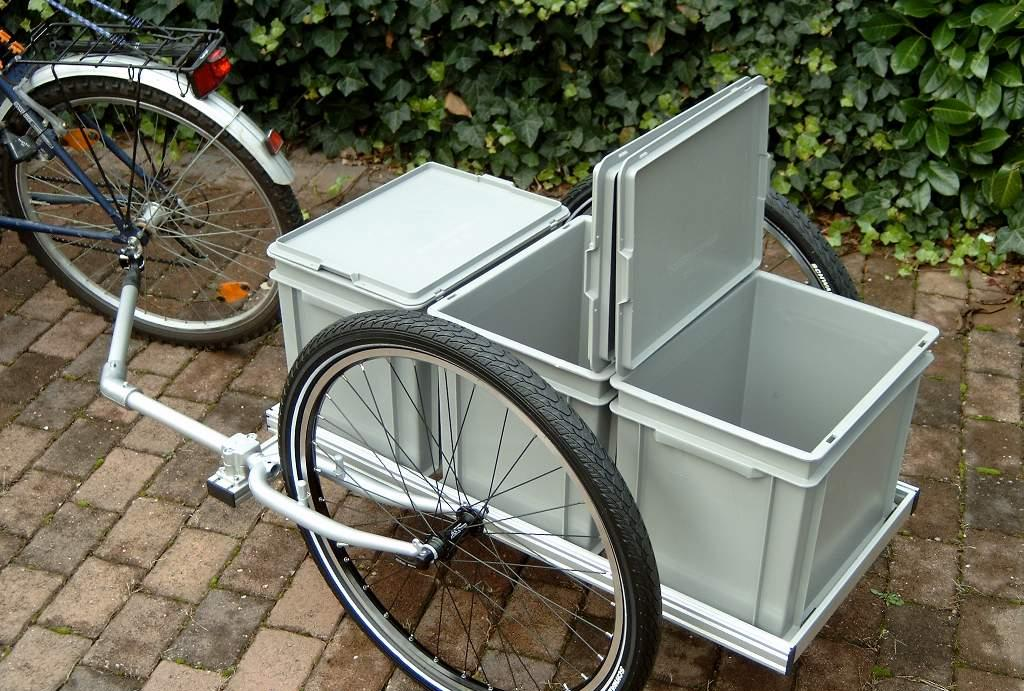
Trailer for bike-trekking with three Euroboxes and aluminium profile framing

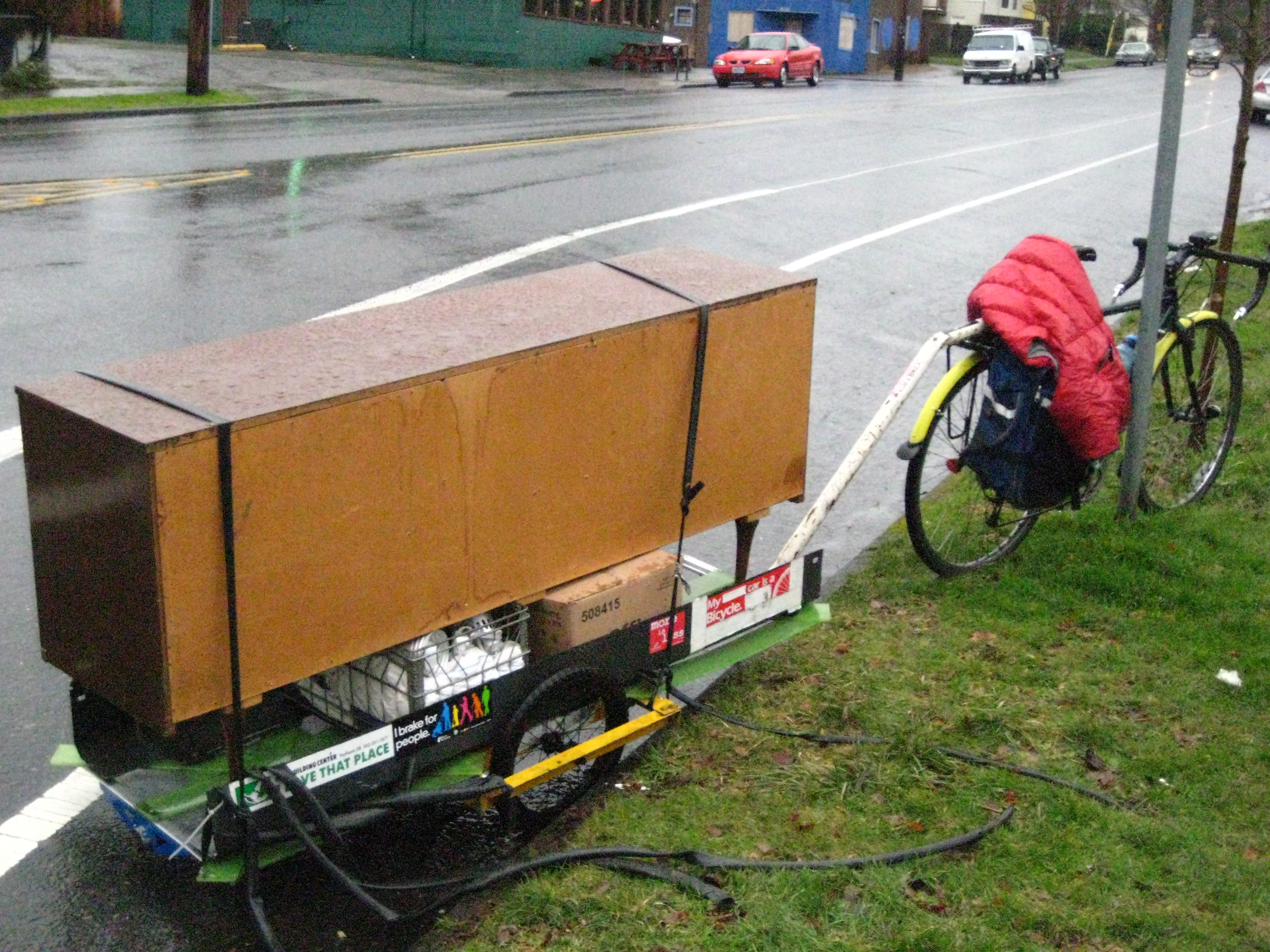
Heavy-duty bike trailer

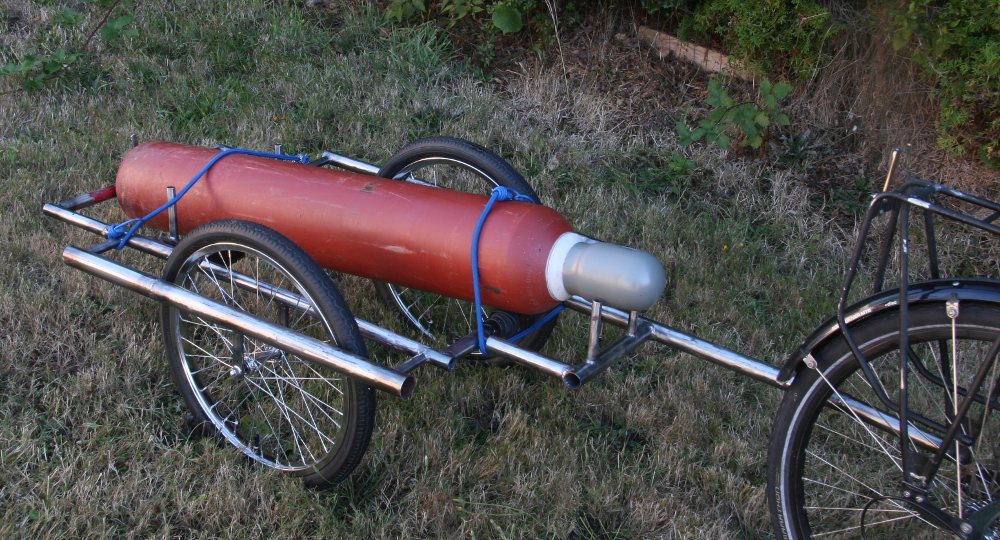
Custom made bicycle trailer for welding gas cylinder

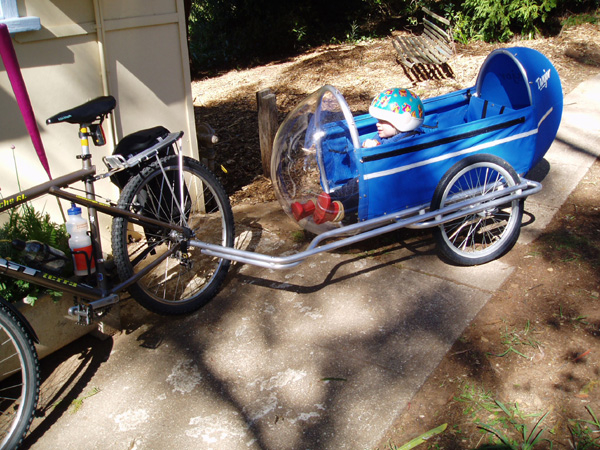
Aerodynamic design that allows total enclosure. For passengers & cargo, or cargo only.

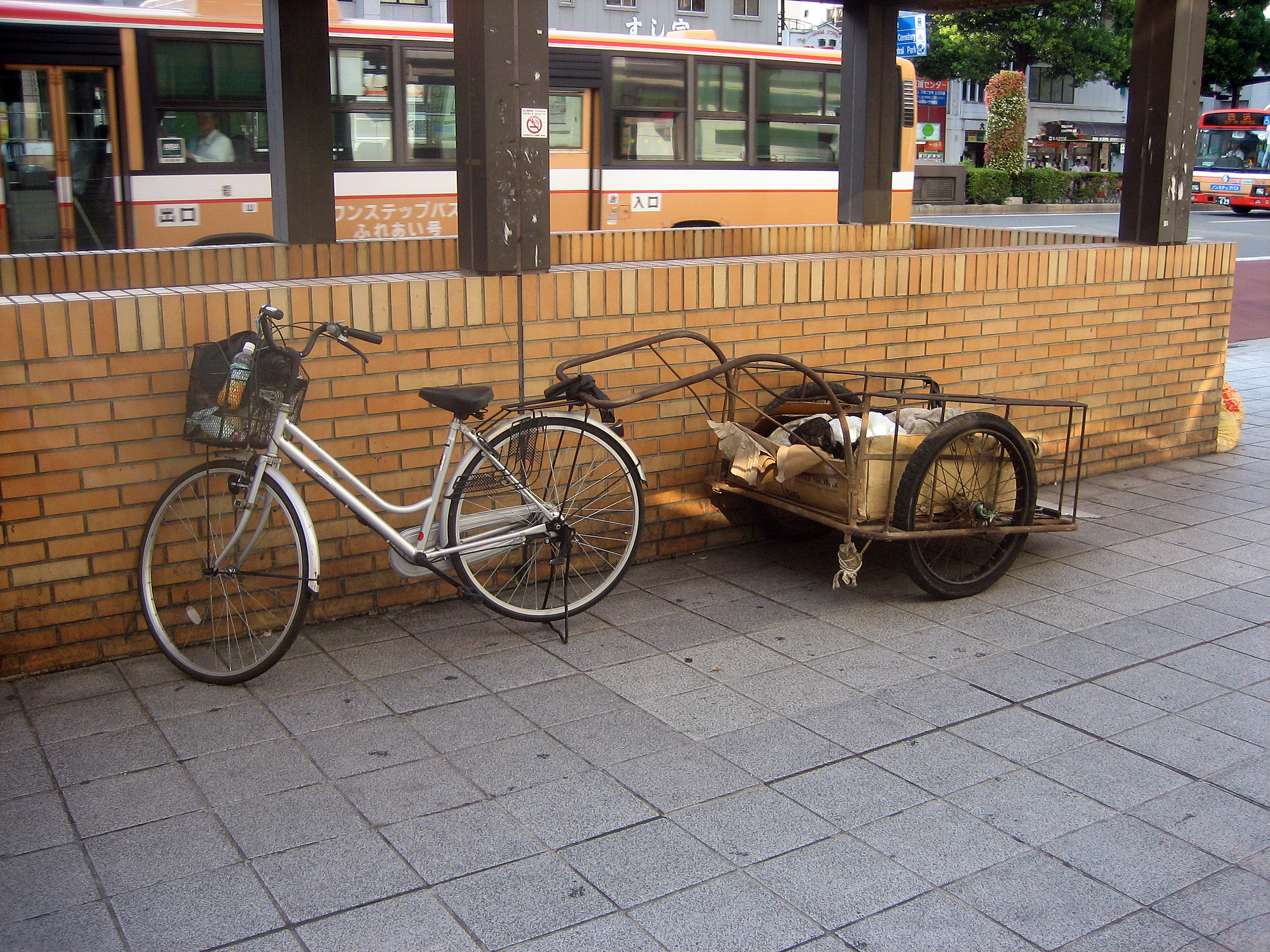
A Japanese utility cart, known as Rearcar (ja:リヤカー). It can be pulled by either human or bicycle.

A bicycle trailer is a motorless wheeled frame with a hitch system for transporting cargo by bicycle. It can greatly increase a bike's cargo capacity, allowing point-to-point haulage of objects up to 3 cubic metres (3000 liters, or 4 cubic yards) in volume that weigh as much as 500 kg. However, very heavily loaded trailers may pose a danger to the cyclist and others, and the voluntary European standard EN 15918 therefore suggests a maximum load of 60 kg on trailers without brakes.

== Types ==
Different types of trailer are designed for various purposes, cargo requirements and riding conditions:

=== By number of wheels ===
- Single-wheel: a single rear-mounted wheel. Though of limited towing capacity, this design tends to be more stable (when moving) than trailers with two or more wheels. The single wheel can tilt from side to side when cornering (as the bicycle itself does), allowing for coordinated turns at relatively high speed. The connection to the bicycle is simpler than a two-wheeled trailer since only two degrees of freedom are required- the trailer tilts with the towing bicycle.
- Two-wheel: A two-wheel design makes possible much greater load carrying capacity and a wider cargo bed. Though not suitable for high speed, they are ideal for everyday cycling (very much like towing a trailer behind a car). Two-wheel trailers tend to be as wide or wider than the handlebars of the bicycle, therefore care needs to be taken when riding through narrow spaces.
- Three-wheel: Similar to two-wheel trailers with wheels on either side of the cargo area, but also equipped with a fork-mounted front wheel to remove practically all tongue weight from the lead vehicle. This trailer is usually connected via a fork-mounted tow bar and allows for the greatest weight capacity out of all types of bicycle trailers, in some instances even equipped with its own overrun brakes and electric motor assist.

=== By intended cargo ===
- General cargo: for transporting cargo of all kinds. The load capacity of commercially available cargo trailers ranges from 14 to 140 kg (30 to 300 pounds), but much larger loads have been transported by custom-built trailers or by multi-trailer "trains" attached to a single bicycle.
- Human passenger (as cargo): constructed to enhance the comfort and safety of one or more human passengers. These usually have a low centre of gravity and widely spaced wheels to increase stability when cornering, and often have integrated rain-proof covers, seat padding, and safety belts. A lot of the trailers designed for transporting children can also be converted to strollers. Trailers have also been used as pedicabs.
- Child passenger (as rider): Trailer bikes, or pedal trailers, are one-wheeled trailers (tandem trailers) with integrated seat, handle bars, and drive train, that normally attaches to the bike via the seat post (and operate very much like a tandem bicycle). These allow small children who can't yet ride a bicycle alone to accompany adult riders as trip participants and motive-power producers. These trailers are by far the most popular style.
- Canoe and kayak trailers: Designed for towing long, thin and relatively lightweight loads such as canoes, kayaks or windsurfing rigs.
- Disabled passengers: Made for safely towing wheelchairs with persons in them.
- Pet trailers: For carrying small domestic animals, especially dogs, that weigh less than 45 kg (100 lb).

=== Electric trailers ===
- Electric bike trailers are trailers with electric propulsion. Most are electric pusher trailers. They are made by various manufacturers.

=== Limits on load ===
- Heavier loads on trailers increase the safety risks. Trailers with brakes (often referred to as braking trailers) allow heavier loads to be safely towed.
- According to the American ASTM F1975-15 standard, a limit of 45.4 kg (100 lb) can be carried in a trailer without brakes. On the other hand, the European EN 15918 standard for the maximum load is 60 kg (132 lb). The heavier the load, the more hazardous the ride becomes due to the inability to stop the trailer from continuing to move forward into the cyclist. This hazard can be diminished if a braking system is added to the trailer, typically some form of overrun or inertial braking system.

== Components ==
=== Axle ===
Most trailers have a separate axle for each wheel, like those used on a bicycle. These separate axles usually mount directly on the frame using either threaded nuts, a quick-release mechanism, or some press fit arrangement. The use of separate axles for two-wheel trailers allows the load carrying area to be between the wheels with its base below the axles, so as to keep the centre of gravity relatively low.

Some trailers support a normal axle on two sides, others mount the wheel off one side with a stub axle (a one sided axle).

=== Brakes ===
- Drum brake: As of 2022, the only type of brake that may be found on bicycle trailers are drum brakes with an inertial rotating actuator.

=== Fender/mud guard ===
If included, the fender (or just a mud flap) helps to protect the cargo and the towing bicycle from road spray and dirt. On heavy-duty trailers, the fender may be designed to be capable of bearing heavy loads.

=== Frame ===
- Metal: usually steel or aluminum alloy tubing, assembled by brazing, welding, or nuts and bolts.
- Wood (or bamboo): seldom seen but sometimes used in makeshift and home-built trailers, fastened with glue, nails, screws, bolts, or a combination thereof.

=== Hitch ===
There are various types, from home made to those supplied by the trailer manufacturers.

Hitch positions:

- Seatpost: Temporary or permanent clamp assembly attaching the trailer hitch to the seat post.
- Rear axle: Special attachment points, integral to the rear quick release skewer or bolted onto solid axles, hold dropouts cut into the trailer hitch.
- Chainstay: Two-piece sandwiching clamp screws tight over left rear triangle, with protruding socket-and-pin receiver.
- Rear cargo or pannier rack: Some improvised hitches attach to the rear cargo rack or pannier frame. Since rear racks are not structural parts of the bicycle they cannot handle much weight or torque loading.
- Improvised: Ropes, bungee cord, chain, cable, etc. Usually not dependable, often dangerous to rider and cargo.

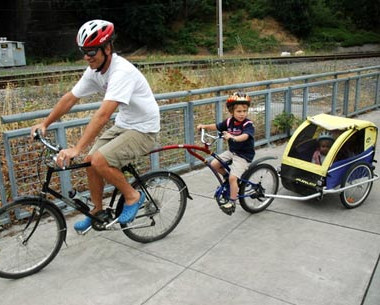
Bike trailer for toddlers and small children

Single-wheel trailers generally use a special frame hitch which attaches to both sides of the rear axle, and which incorporates a vertical hinge to allow cornering. Attaching the trailer at the seat-post can (dependent on the design) place the load at a lower point relative to the longitudinal pivot axis of the attached trailer. This can make it possible to wheel a loaded single-wheel trailer around while disconnected from the bike, as the seat-post hitch is a natural height for grasping while walking upright.

Hitches for two-wheel trailers must incorporate some form of universal joint or flexible coupling. It is usually attached to the non-drive side of the bicycle. If the joint relies on a certain amount of play to give the required movement, then there is the possibility of speed wobble resonances at certain cadences ("pedaling speeds") and trailer loads (both total mass and load placement). The effect is that the trailer feels as if it is 'bumping' the bicycle. However, there are other methods such as spring with a nylon tube inserted through the middle to provide rigidity and flexibility, allowing the bicycle to lean while the trailer remains upright and isolates the bicycle from any resonance.

Two-wheel trailers which attach to the rear axle or chainstay generally have an angled towbar to help keep the trailer central behind the bicycle.

=== Wheel ===
- Traditional spoked bicycle wheel in various sizes. Has the advantage of being light, strong, readily available. Pneumatic tires provide some suspension for the load, larger diameters ride smoothly and have much less drag than many other types of wheels.
- Solid metal wheels with solid treads, such as dolly wheels. Extremely durable but rough riding and usually slow due to small diameter.

== Standards ==
In September 2011 a voluntary European standard (EN 15918) for two-wheel bicycle trailers was published. This standard applies to trailers carrying cargo and/or up to 2 passengers, and enforces a maximum gross weight of 60 kg. There are many safety-related requirements, including restraints, structural integrity, stability, small parts, sharp edges, etc.

In 2015, a North American standard (ASTM F1975-15) was published, which urges a maximum accessory load of 45.4 kg to not be exceeded; the standard applies to non-powered bicycle trailers carrying 1 or 2 children passengers.

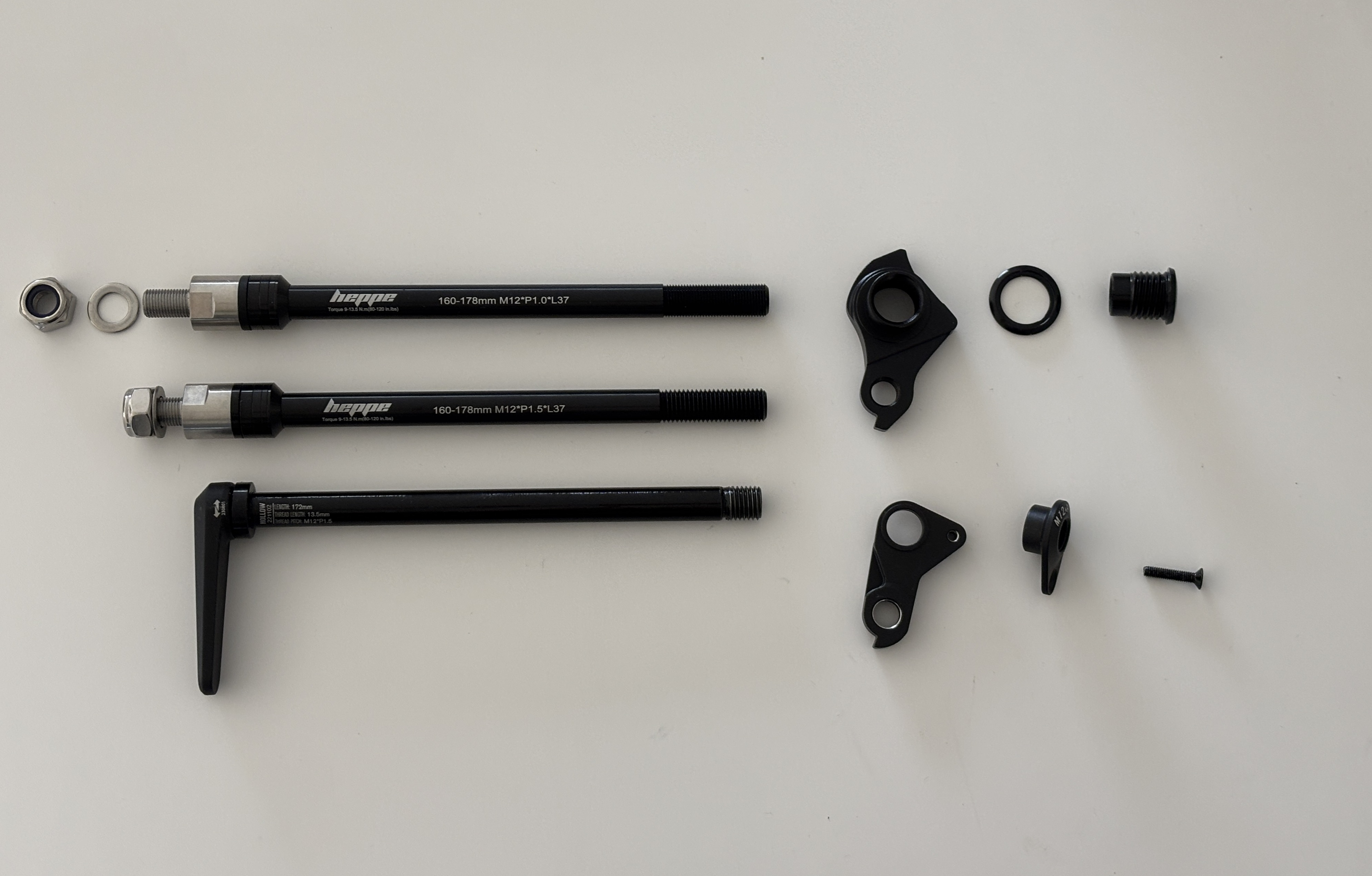
Three M12 through-axles: Top: 1 mm pitch axle for bicycle trailer (via M10 bolt) with spacers for adjustable axle length (160-178 mm), 37 mm thread length, shown with a universal derailleur hanger (UDH). Bottom: 1.5 mm pitch axle with tool-less handle, without M10 nut and hence not suitable for attaching a bicycle trailer

== See also ==
- Cyclologistics
- Outline of cycling
- Trailer (vehicle)
- Cargo bike
