= Wingnut (hardware) =

Type of fastener

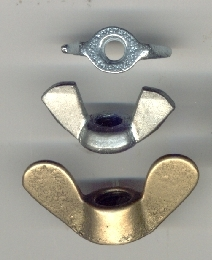
Three wingnuts

A wingnut, wing nut or butterfly nut is a type of nut with two large metal "wings", one on each side, so it can be easily tightened and loosened by hand without tools.

A similar fastener with a male thread is known as a wing screw or a wing bolt.

== Types ==
ASME B18.6.9 classifies wing nuts first by manufacturing method and then by style.

- Type A are cold forged or cold formed produced in regular, light and heavy dimensional series.
- Type B are hot forged solid nuts available in three different wing styles.
- Type C are die cast nuts available in three wing styles with variances between regular and heavy dimensional series
- Type D are stamped sheet metal nuts available in three wing styles.

== Usage ==
=== Bicycles ===
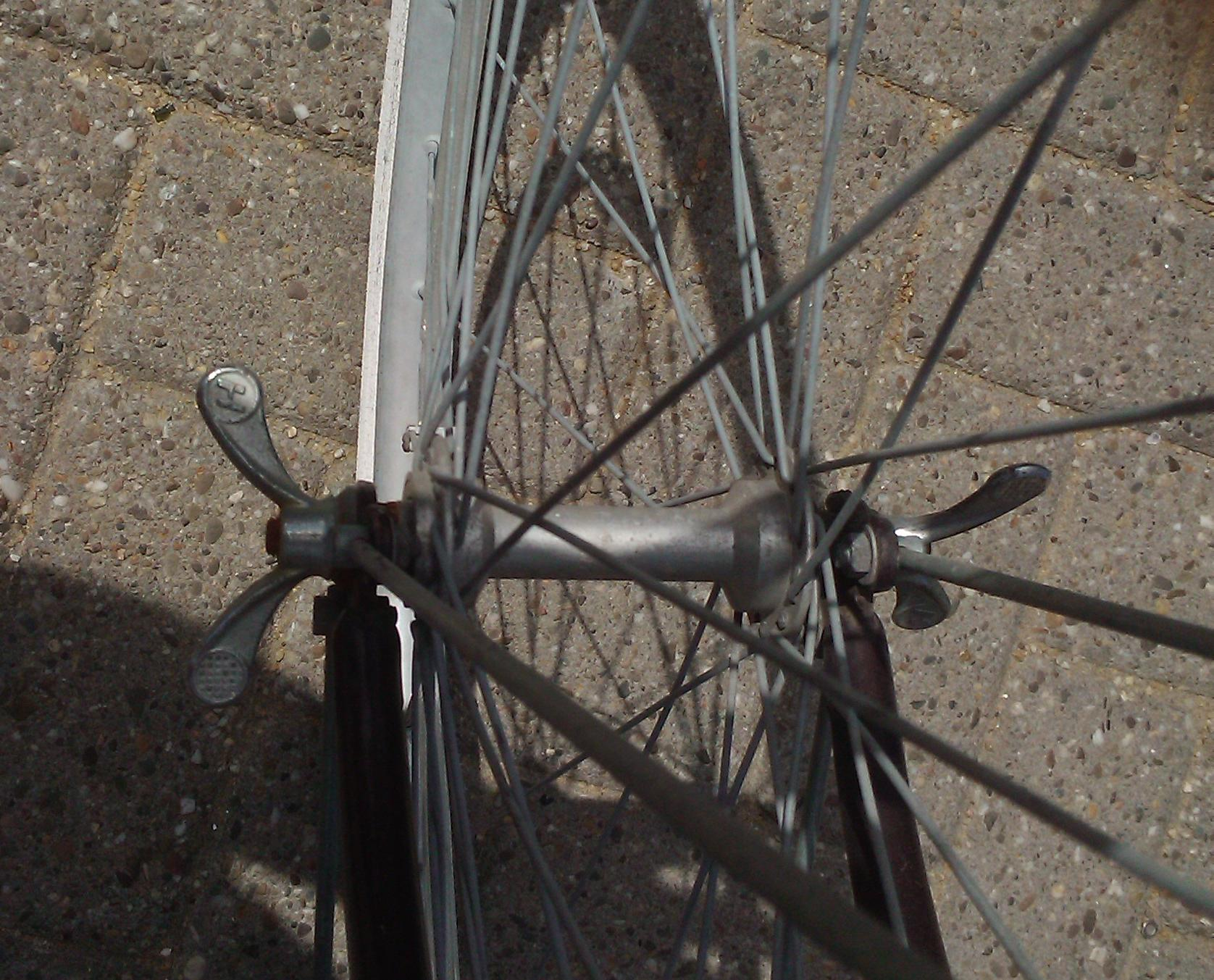
Bicycle wingnuts

Before the development of quick release skewers, bicycle wheels were held in place with wingnuts.

=== Drum hardware ===
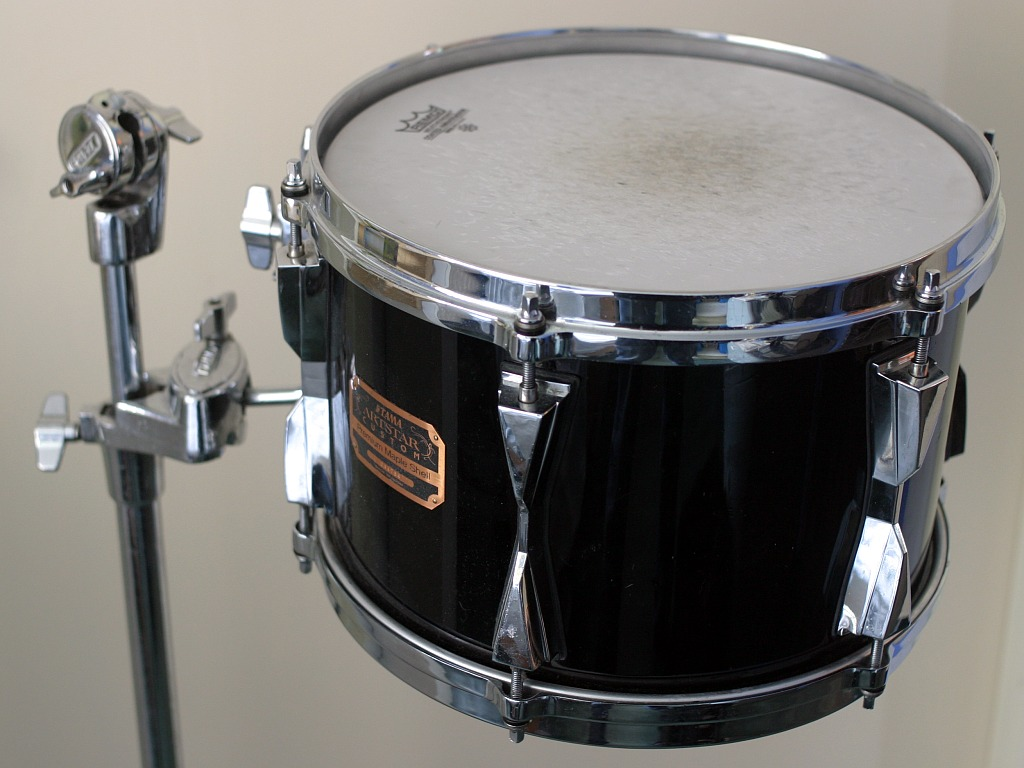
Three wingnuts and wingbolts supporting a drum

In a drum kit wingnuts and wingbolts are used extensively.

- For securing a suspended cymbal on the mounting bolt of a cymbal stand.
- For securing an adjustment on a stand.
- In connection with memory.

In drum hardware, memory refers to any system that preserves the adjustment of a stand, boom or bracket when the kit is disassembled.

Most commonly this takes the form of a collar on a tube, fixed in place by a screw operated by a drum key. This collar mates with a fitting that receives the tube and secures it by means of a wingnut or wingbolt. When the stand is disassembled, only the wingnut or wingbolt needs to be loosened, and the collar remains in place, allowing the stand to be easily reassembled in exactly the same adjustment. When the stand needs to be adjusted, the collar is first loosened by means of a drum key.

=== Seltzer bottle ===
The device that surrounds a CO_{2} cartridge in a seltzer bottle is also a wingnut. Twisting the wingnut completes a seal around the cartridge neck; twisting a bit more causes a pin to pierce the cartridge and let the gas into the bottle.

== See also ==
- Mechanical joint
- Thumbscrew (fastener)
