= 377 Campania =

Main-belt asteroid

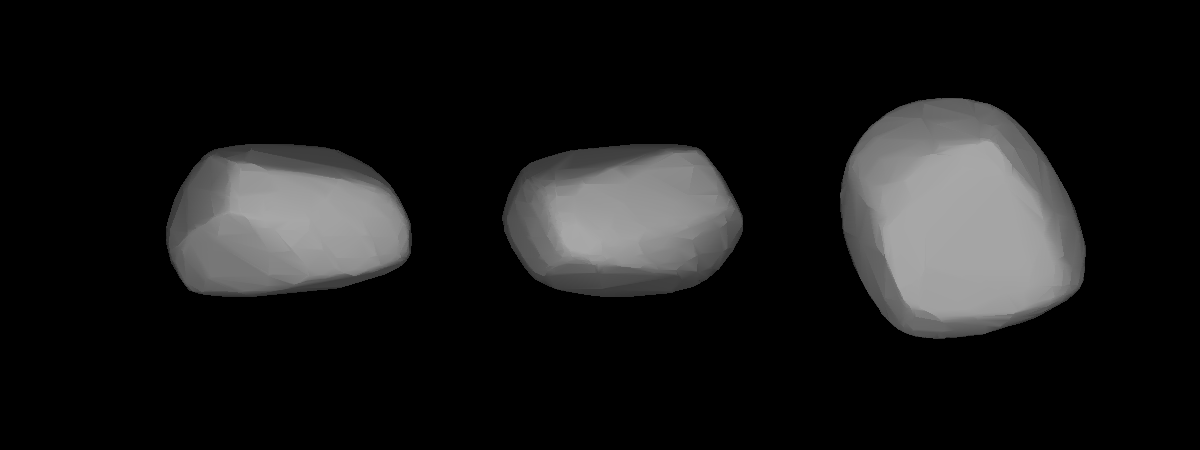
- A three-dimensional model of 377 Campania based on its light curve

Discovery
- Discovered by: Auguste Charlois
- Discovery site: Nice Observatory
- Discovery date: 20 September 1893

Designations
- Pronunciation: /kæmˈpeɪniə/
- Named after: Campania
- Alternative designations: A893 SD · 1935 GP · 1946 UP (Note: The MPC notates Campania's old-style designation as 1893 SD. Its original old-style designation was 1893 AN.)
- Minor planet category: Main belt

Orbital characteristics
- Epoch 21 November 2025 (JD 2461000.5)
- Uncertainty parameter 0
- Observation arc: 132.07 yr (48239 d)
- Aphelion: 2.8928 AU (432.76 Gm)
- Perihelion: 2.4880 AU (372.20 Gm)
- Semi-major axis: 2.6904 AU (402.48 Gm)
- Eccentricity: 0.0752
- Orbital period (sidereal): 4.4129 yr (1611.8 d)
- Mean anomaly: 311.766°
- Mean motion: 0° 13^{m} 23.88^{s} / day
- Inclination: 6.6776°
- Longitude of ascending node: 209.914°
- Argument of perihelion: 196.952°
- Jupiter MOID: 2.4293 AU (363.42 Gm)
- T_{Jupiter}: 3.358

Physical characteristics
- Mean diameter: 92.40±1.08 km (composite estimate); 90.346 km
- Mass: (1.00±0.18)×10^{18} kg (Note: Calculated from its standard gravitational parameter GM = 0.067±0.012 km^{3}/s^{2}.)
- Mean density: 2.60 g/cm^{3}
- Sidereal rotation period: 11.664401 h
- Pole ecliptic longitude: 47° or 196°
- Pole ecliptic latitude: +67° or +66°
- Geometric albedo: 0.060
- Spectral type: PD-type (Tholen); Ch-type (SMASSII)
- Absolute magnitude (H): 9.11

377 Campania is a large asteroid located in the main asteroid belt. It was discovered by French astronomer Auguste Charlois on 20 September 1893 in Nice, and it was named after the Italian region of Campania. It is around 90 kilometres (56 mi) in diameter and rotates relatively slowly with a rotation period of 11.66 hours.

== Discovery and naming ==
Campania was discovered by astronomer Auguste Charlois on 20 September 1893 in Nice Observatory. Its discovery, alongside that of three other asteroids, was announced on 22 September in the journal Astronomische Nachrichten under the provisional designation 1893 AN. It was given the name Campania, after the Italian coastal region of Campania.

In 1925, the old-style scheme for minor planet provisional designations was replaced by the new-style scheme that is now currently in use. The Minor Planet Center (MPC) has since retroactively revised pre-1925 designations to conform to the new-style scheme. Thus, Campania's old-style designation given upon its discovery was changed to A893 SD.

== Orbit ==
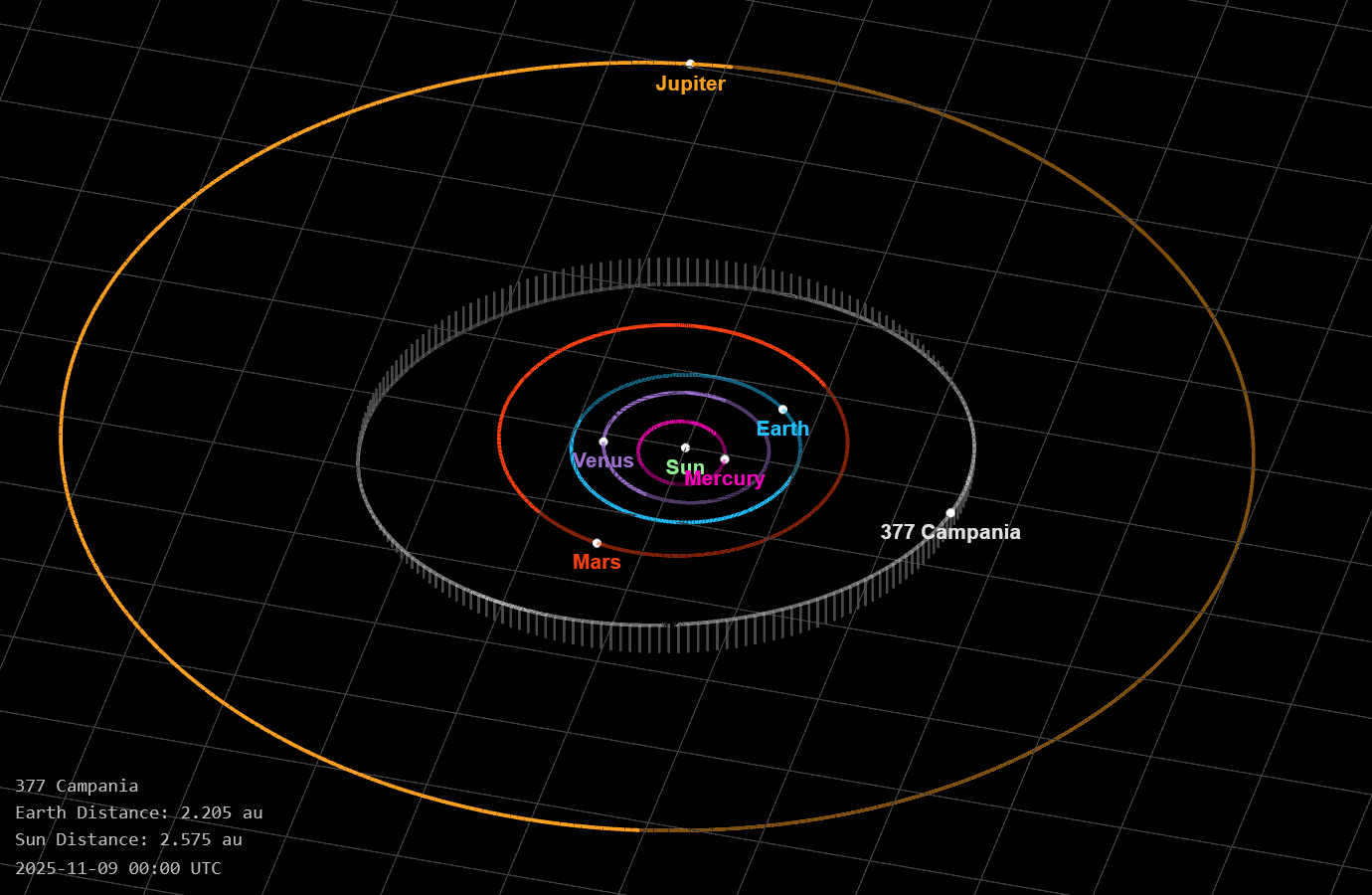
A diagram of Campania's orbit between Mars and Jupiter

Campania orbits the Sun with an average distance—its semi-major axis—of 2.69 astronomical units, placing it in the main asteroid belt. Along its 4.41 year long orbit, its distance from the Sun varies between 2.49 AU at perihelion to 2.89 AU at aphelion due to its orbital eccentricity of 0.08. Its orbit is inclined by 6.68° with respect to the ecliptic plane.

== Physical characteristics ==
Campania is estimated to be 90.346 kilometres (56.138 mi) in diameter. It has a geometric albedo of 0.06, and it is classified as either a PD-type asteroid under the Tholen classification scheme or a Ch-type asteroid under the Small Main-belt Asteroid Spectroscopic Survey, Phase II (SMASSII) classification scheme.

Early attempts at determining Campania's rotation period from its lightcurve—variations in its observed brightness—often yielded conflicting results. In 1994, a team of astronomers led by H. J. Schober used observations of Campania taken by the European Southern Observatory (ESO) in 1983, suggesting a rotation period close to 12 or 18 hours. The team noted that its lightcurve appeared to peak at the same time every night. Photometric observations conducted by the Torino Observatory in Italy in 1990–1991 determined a synodic rotation period of 8.507 ± 0.003 hours. In 1995, a study led by M.-C. Hainaut-Rouelle utilized ESO observations taken in 1990 to derive a rotation period 14.557±0.013 hours. Then, in 1998, astronomers C. Blanco and D. Riccioli used the amplitude–magnitude method to three nights of observations taken in August 1992 to derive a period of 8.48±0.01 hours.

In 1999, a team of astronomers led by A. Marciniak began a series of observation campaigns during Campania's apparitions. By 2007 they were able to conclude that Campania has a relatively long period of 11.66 hours. Campania has ambiguous ecliptic pole coordinates of (λ = 47°, β = +67°) or (λ = 196°, β = +66°), and it rotates in a prograde direction.
