= Campagna Motors =

Canadian motor vehicle manufacturer

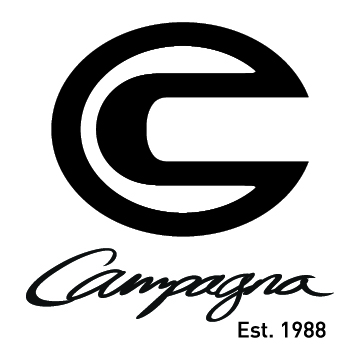
- Company type: Family Owned Corporation
- Industry: Automotive
- Founded: 1988
- Headquarters: Boucherville Quebec, Canada
- Key people: Julien Masse, General Manager
- Number of employees: 15-25

Campagna Motors is a Canadian motorcycle manufacturer. It was founded in 1988 in the Province of Quebec, Canada. It developed its first T-Rex prototype in 1994. Campagna's founder Daniel Campagna devoted more than eight years to creating T-Rex, handcrafting the first vehicles.

Campagna is the Italian word for "countryside".

On 20 January 2019 Campagna Motors briefly closed due to bankruptcy. On 28 February 2019, Campagna Motors announced new investors and stated that it would restart production and sales.

== History ==
In 1976, 1977 and 1979, Daniel Campagna was a Formula 1 Ford Racing Team driver in Quebec. He introduced significant inventions, including the Voodoo; an off-road racer, in 1982.

He hand-built a first model of the T-Rex in 1988, the Concept 3, and then founded his own company, Campagna Moto Sport Inc. In 1990, he brought together a team and completed a first model of the vehicle a few years later that became a showcase at the 1994 edition of the Montreal Auto Show at the Olympic Stadium.

From 1994 to 2000, the T-Rex was available only in the Province of Quebec. Since the early 2000s, they have been sold all over the world, but mostly in the USA. In June 2004, Campagna Moto Sport was facing financial difficulties and granted exclusive worldwide manufacturing and sales licenses of T-Rex through T-REX Vehicles Inc.

In spring 2008, T-REX Vehicles Inc. declared bankruptcy. The assets of the company were redeemed the same year by André Morissette and David Neault, who formed Campagna Motors.

In January 2009, Campagna Motors announced the relocation of its Plessisville plant to Boucherville, to get closer to Montreal.

Since July 2009, the company has had around 25 employees producing two to three vehicles per week.

Another vehicle, the V13R, was introduced in 2008 as the Cirbin V-Rod, before Cirbin and Campagna Motors merged, following the acquisition of Campagna Motors by Cirbin. It was renamed the Campagna V13R. The V stands for "V-Twin"; 13 stands for 1,300 cc, the engine's displacement, and R for "Roadster".

Since 2013, Campagna has a long-term strategic agreement with the BMW Group that allows them to use the BMW 1,649 cc in-line 6 cylinder motorcycle engine in the T-Rex.

On April 4, 2018, an electric prototype was released; based on the original T-Rex but featuring the electric powertrain of Zero Motorcycle. The Electric T-Rex was used to see if an electric motor would be viable and appeal to the customer base.

In 2021, a new model has been released, the T-Rex RR, featuring a more powerful engine from Kawasaki.

In 2023, an upgrade was made to the T-Rex RR, adding ABS to the vehicle.

Campagna Motors came under new ownership and as of April 2019 production restarted in the Boucherville factory.

== Models ==
=== Current ===
- Campagna T-Rex - a two-seat, three-wheeled cyclecar utilizing a Kawasaki engine, from the ZX-14.
- Campagna V13R - a two-seat, three-wheeled cyclecar utilizing a 122 hp Harley-Davidson Revolution engine.

=== Former ===
- Campagna Motors TR Thunder
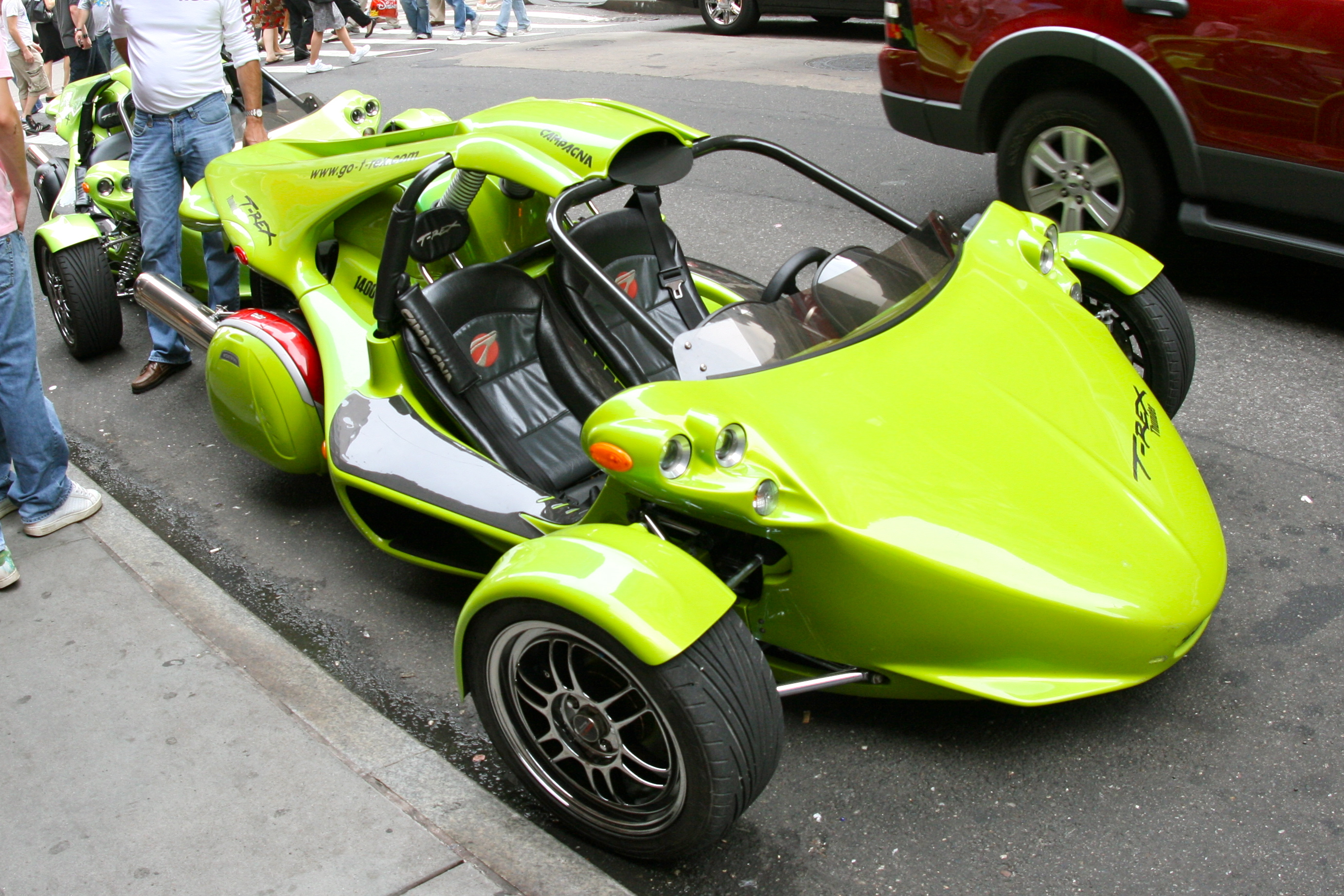
Stock 2007 T-Rex

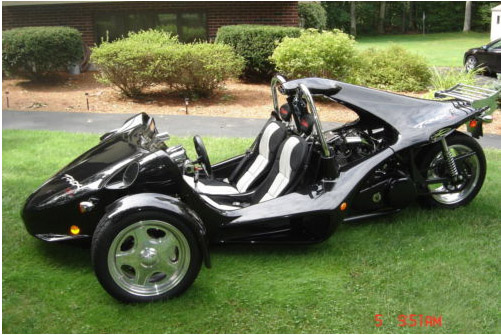
Campagna Motors TR Thunder

== Media ==
The T-REX was featured on the show How It's Made and Jay Leno's Garage.
