= Quick release skewer =

Bicycle wheel attaching mechanism

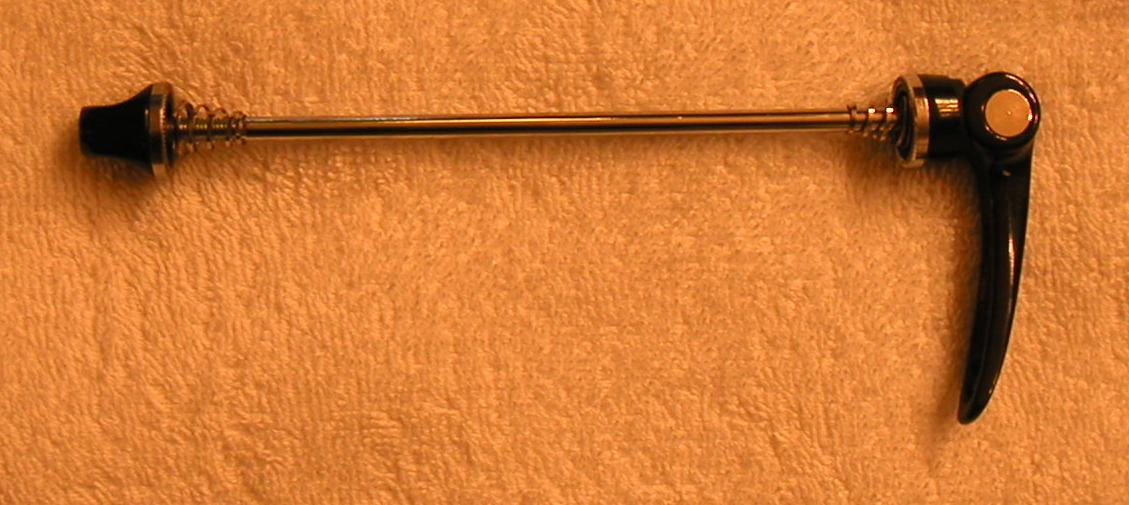
Quick release skewer, removed from a hub, in the closed position

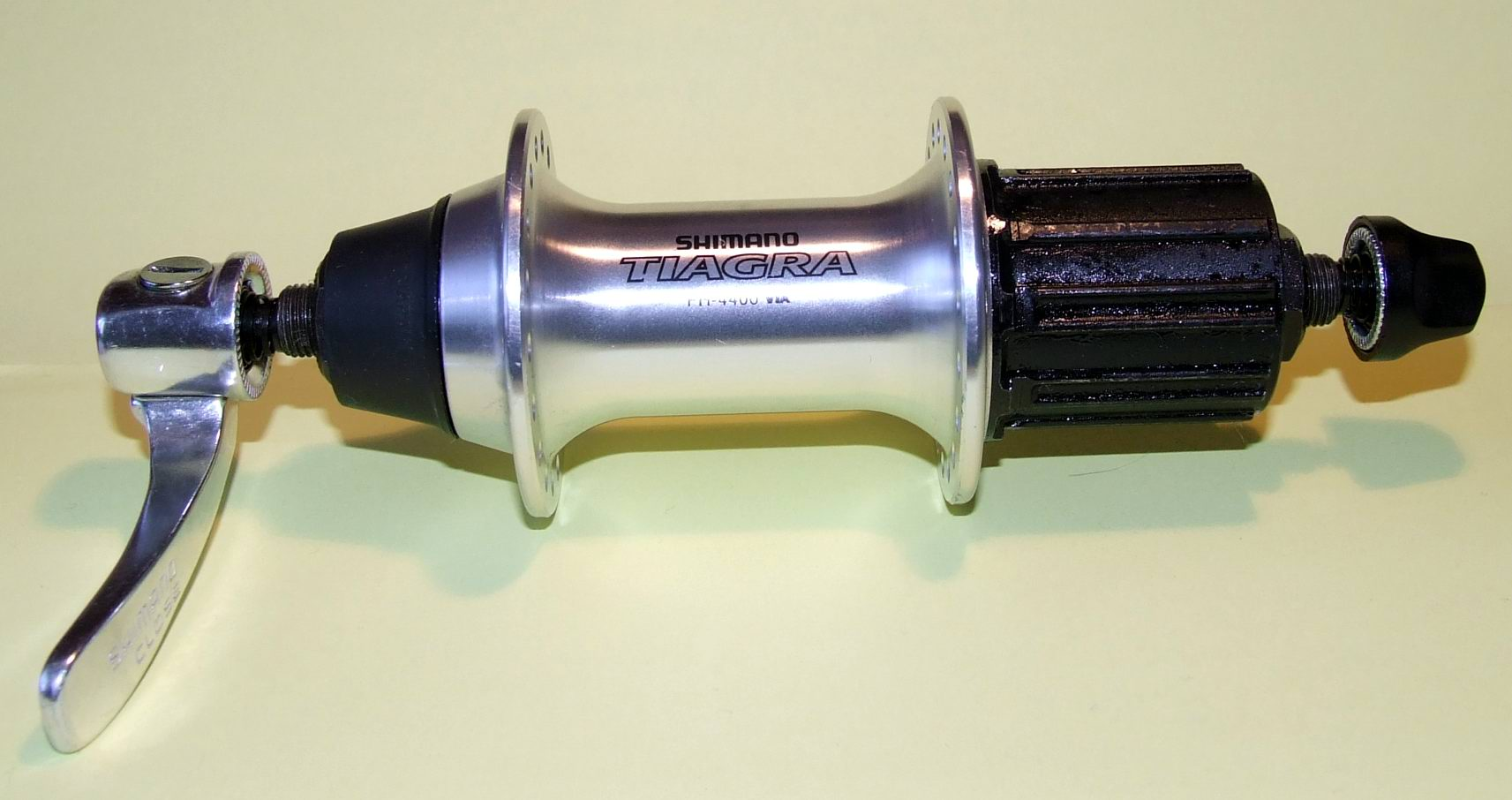
Hub with its skewer mounted

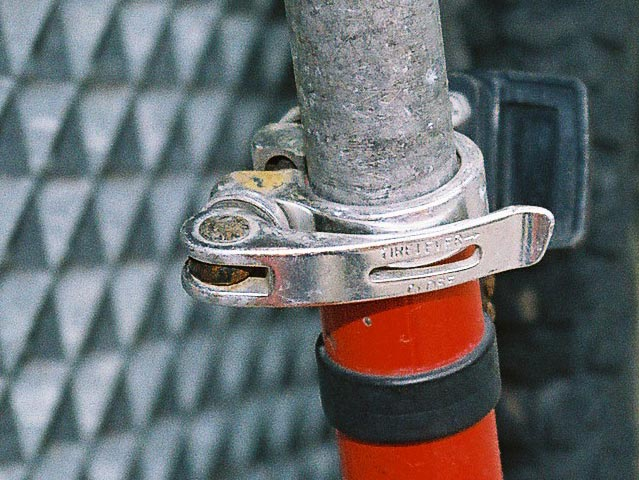
Quick release clamp on a seatpost

A quick release skewer is a mechanism for attaching a wheel to a bicycle. It consists of a rod threaded on one end and with a lever operated cam assembly on the other. The rod is inserted into the hollow axle of the wheel, a special nut is threaded on, and the lever is closed to tighten the cam and secure the wheel to the fork. Wheels equipped with quick release mechanisms can be removed from the bicycle frame and replaced without using tools by opening and closing the cam lever, thus more quickly than wheels with solid axles and nuts. On the negative side, a quick-release hub renders a wheel more vulnerable to theft and care must be taken to ensure that the mechanism is properly tightened.

Similar quick-release mechanisms are also used to operate seatpost clamps, and the collapsing stem of folding bicycles and kick scooters.

== History ==
The mechanism was invented in 1927 by Tullio Campagnolo, an Italian bicycle racer. He was frustrated when he attempted to change gears during a race. At the time there was but one cog on each side of the rear hub, so gear changes necessitated stopping, removing the rear wheel, flipping it over horizontally so that the opposite cog is engaged by the chain, and finally reinstalling the wheel. The weather had turned cold, and his hands were numb, so he could not operate the wingnuts which retained the wheel. He had been well-placed prior to the gear change, but lost valuable time. This prompted him to develop the quick release.

Another Campagnolo invention that made use of the quick-release mechanism was the Cambio Corsa, a multi-gear changing system consisting of a rear wheel quick-release lever with a mechanical extension that placed the lever itself near the bicycle's saddle, combined with a fork that served as a primitive version of a rear derailleur (without idler pulleys to take up slack), that also had a control lever near the bicycle saddle. This innovation enabled bicycle riders quickly to change gears while in motion by releasing the axle, moving the rear wheel slightly forward by applying tension to the chain, actuating the fork to change to a larger sprocket, and tightening the quick release again; or else releasing the axle, actuating the fork to change to a smaller sprocket, moving the wheel slightly rearward by braking, and tightening the quick release again. The quick-release mechanism, along with other innovations and high standards of manufacture, enabled Campagnolo to become a leading road cycling and track cycling component manufacturer.

== Use ==
Quick releases tend not to be used on certain types of bicycles, such as utility bicycles (with a single speed or hub gears) or track bicycles, partly because of tradition and partly because there is less need for quick removal of wheels without using tools.

Quick releases are sometimes recommended against with the use of disc brakes because of the need for the axle attachment to withstand braking forces.

Skewers of French origin differed in threading, as they and all specifications of a French bicycle once were based on the Metric System. Despite modern measurements for bicycles being given in metric units, they are based on the United States Customary System (derived from English Units), ie, 28.6 millimeters ≈ 1 1/8 inches.

Over the years quick release mechanisms have been adopted as the primary wheel release devices by the average rider. According to Sheldon Brown (bicycle mechanic), manufacturers often encumber fork ends with additional hardware features meant to retain the wheel even if it is not installed properly. This practice evolved to address the limited competence of some users who could remove wheels, but not properly reinstall them. These hardware features have become known as "lawyer lips" or "lawyer tabs" because manufacturers implemented them to avoid costly litigation. These secondary rentention systems in front, and vertical dropouts in the rear, while cheaper to manufacture, are less secure than traditional skewers. Additionally, the introduction of disc brakes has caused increased vulnerability of the front axle and skewer, due to the disc brake applying an ejection force that tends to pull the axle out of the fork.

The quick-release levers are usually on the left side of the bike, though some prefer to have them on the right if a disc brake is on the left. Mountain bikers often prefer to point the lever backwards, to reduce the risk of it catching on undergrowth and being pulled open.

== Variations ==
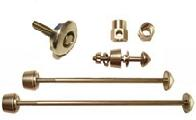
Locking skewers use specially-shaped nut/bolt to protect various parts of a bicycle

Locking skewers are available without handles or with specialty removable handles in order to deter wheel theft.

== Compared to through-axles ==
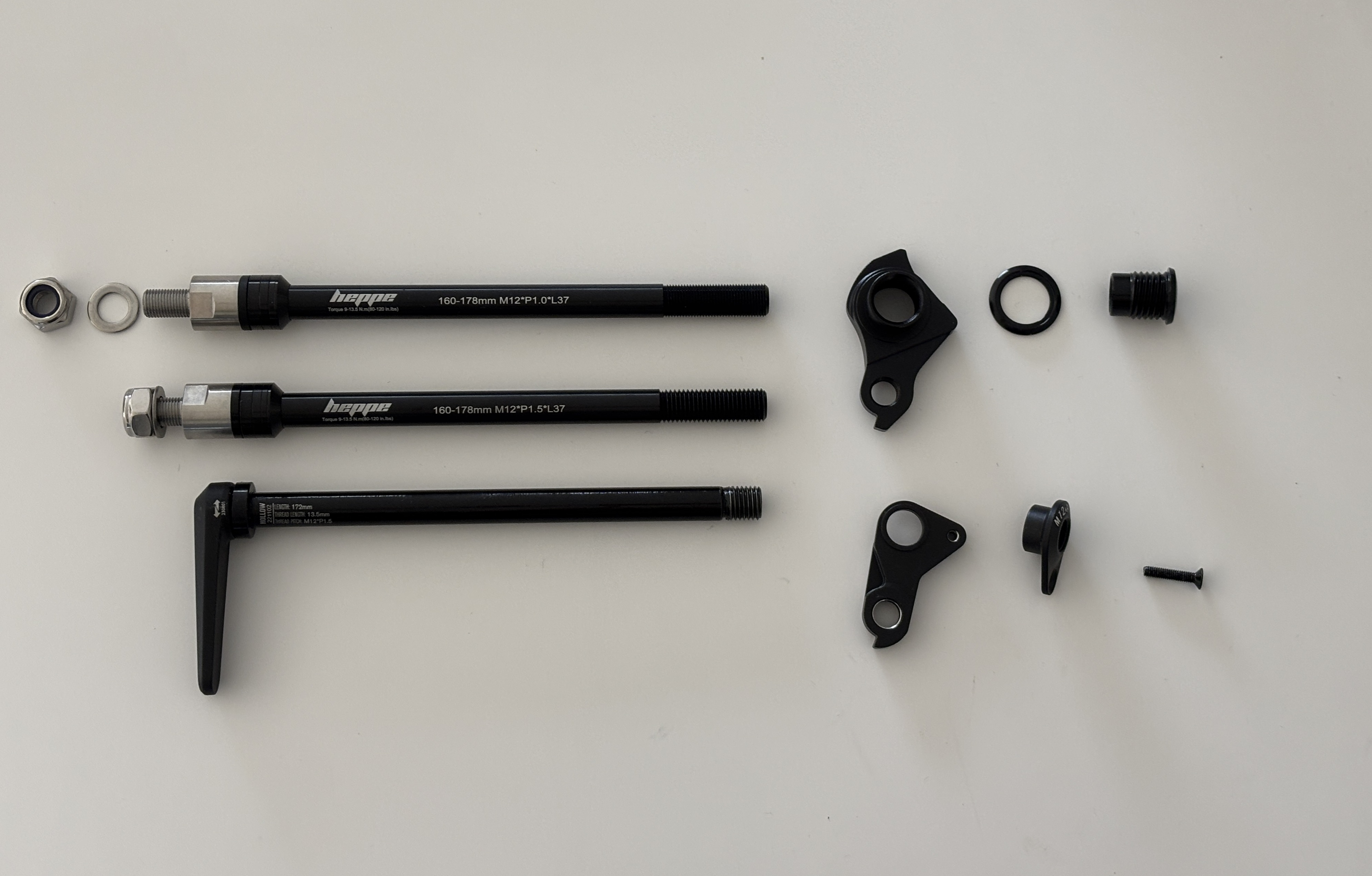
Three M12 through-axles: Top: 1 mm pitch axle for bicycle trailer (M10 bolt) with spacers for adjustable axle length (160-178 mm), 37 mm thread length, shown with a universal derailleur hanger (UDH) Mid: 1.5 mm pitch axle with spacers for adjustable length (160-178 mm), 37 mm thread length Bottom: 1.5 mm pitch axle with tool-less handle, 172 mm long, 13.5 mm thread length, shown with Carbonda 696 (pre-UDH) derailleur hanger

A through axle or thru-axle is a bicycle axle that is essentially a threaded bolt that is slid through the bicycle wheel hub from one side.

Introduced around the early 2000s, they originated from mountain biking, and since also spread to gravel and road bikes. In the late 2010s, through axles had replaced quick-release skewers on most new high-end bikes, while many mid and low-end bicycles still typically use quick-release skewers.

Benefits of through-axles is that they provide a stronger and more secure attachment, which adds stiffness and hold disc brakes more securely. Some disadvantages are that they are around 100 grams heavier, is not attached to the wheel during wheels changes (and hence the axle can more easily get lost), as well that wheel changes are a few seconds slower compared to quick releases. Unlike quick releases, thru-axles are also available in many different lengths, which must be selected according to the frame and derailleur hanger of the bicycle. Lastly, thru-axles are available in different thread pitches and thread lengths, which also must be selected according to the frame.
