= HMS Campania =

Two Royal Navy ships have been named HMS Campania, after the Campania region of Italy:

- RMS Campania was a Cunard ocean liner, launched in 1892. In 1914 she was converted into the first HMS Campania, which was an armed merchant cruiser and seaplane tender. She was sunk in a collision in 1918.
- HMS Campania (D48) was an escort carrier. She was launched in 1943, and scrapped in 1955.

== See also ==
- Campania was an Austro-Hungarian-owned cargo ship that was built in 1901. The US seized her in 1917, and renamed her Kerowlee. She was scrapped in 1933.
