= Campagnoli =

Campagnoli is an Italian surname. Notable people with the surname include:

- Bartolomeo Campagnoli (1751–1827), Italian violinist
- Edy Campagnoli (1934–1995), Italian television personality and actress
- José María Campagnoli, Argentine prosecutor
- Marcela Campagnoli, Argentine politician
- Mauro Campagnoli, Italian anthropologist, ethnomusicologist and composer
- Renato Campagnoli, Italian professional golfer
