= Campagna T-Rex =

Campagna T-REX
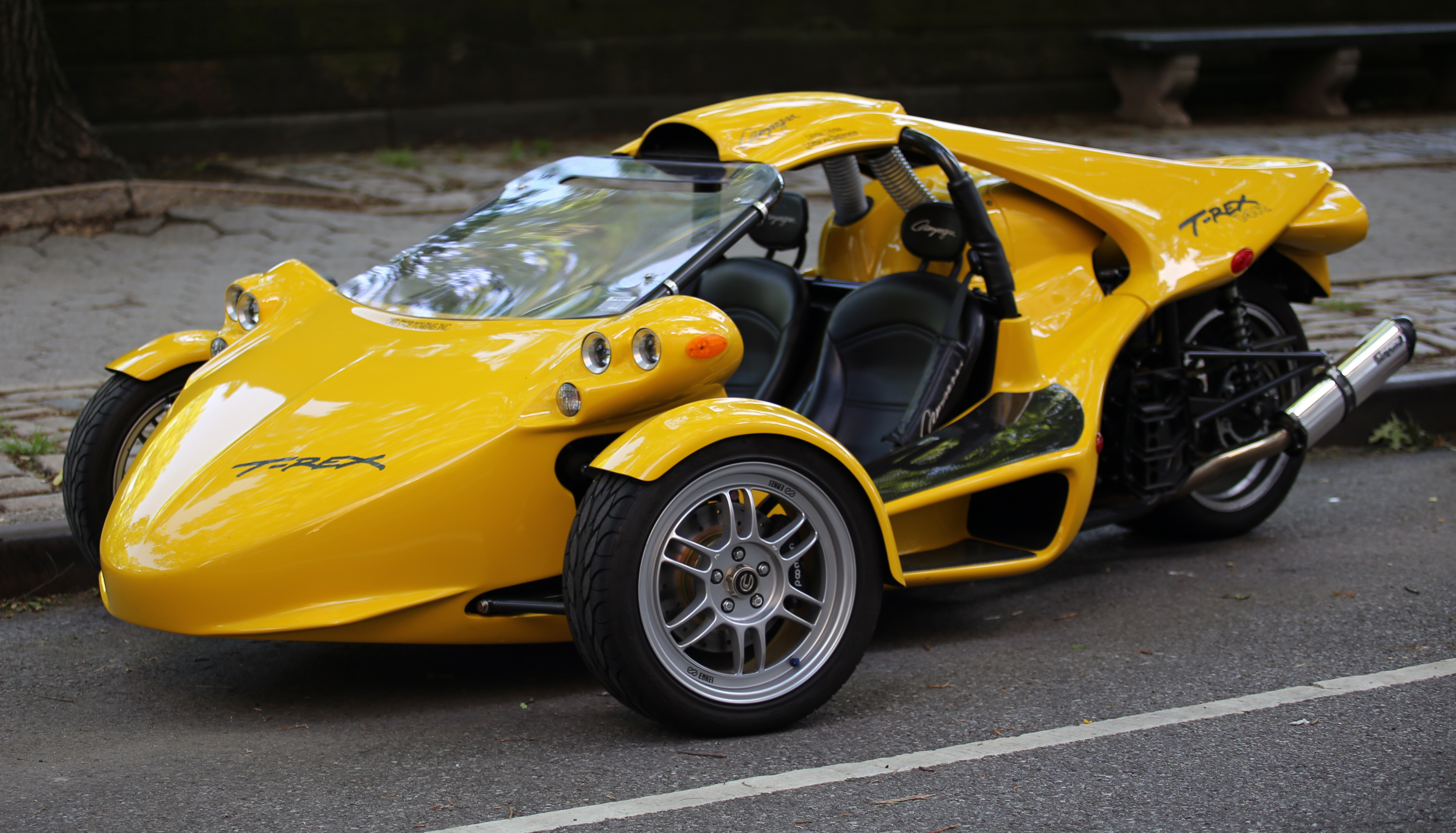
- Manufacturer: Campagna Motors
- Production: 1988–present
- Assembly: Boucherville, Quebec
- Engine: 1.6 L BMW I6
- Power: 160 hp
- Torque: 129 lb-ft
- Transmission: 6-speed sequential manual
- Wheelbase: 2,286 mm (90.0 in)
- Dimensions: L: 3,500 mm (140 in); W: 1,981 mm (78.0 in); H: 1,067 mm (42.0 in)
- Fuel capacity: 28 l

The Campagna T-Rex is a two-seat, three-wheeled motor vehicle created by Campagna Motors, located in Quebec, Canada. It is powered by an in-line 4-cylinder engine from Kawasaki. Although it used to be registered as a motorcycle, it is now largely considered a "three-wheeler". However, in some states, like Arizona, it can still be registered as a motorcycle, but not require a motorcycle endorsement. The interior can accommodate the driver and a single passenger seated side-by-side, with adjustable seat backs, a foot-pedal box, and retractable three-point seat belts. The T-Rex uses a sequential manual transmission, operated by hand with a shift lever, which is the same type of manual transmission used in motorcycles.

The T-REX has been commercially available since the early 1990s. The Campagna T-REX was designed and styled by Deutschman Design.

== History ==
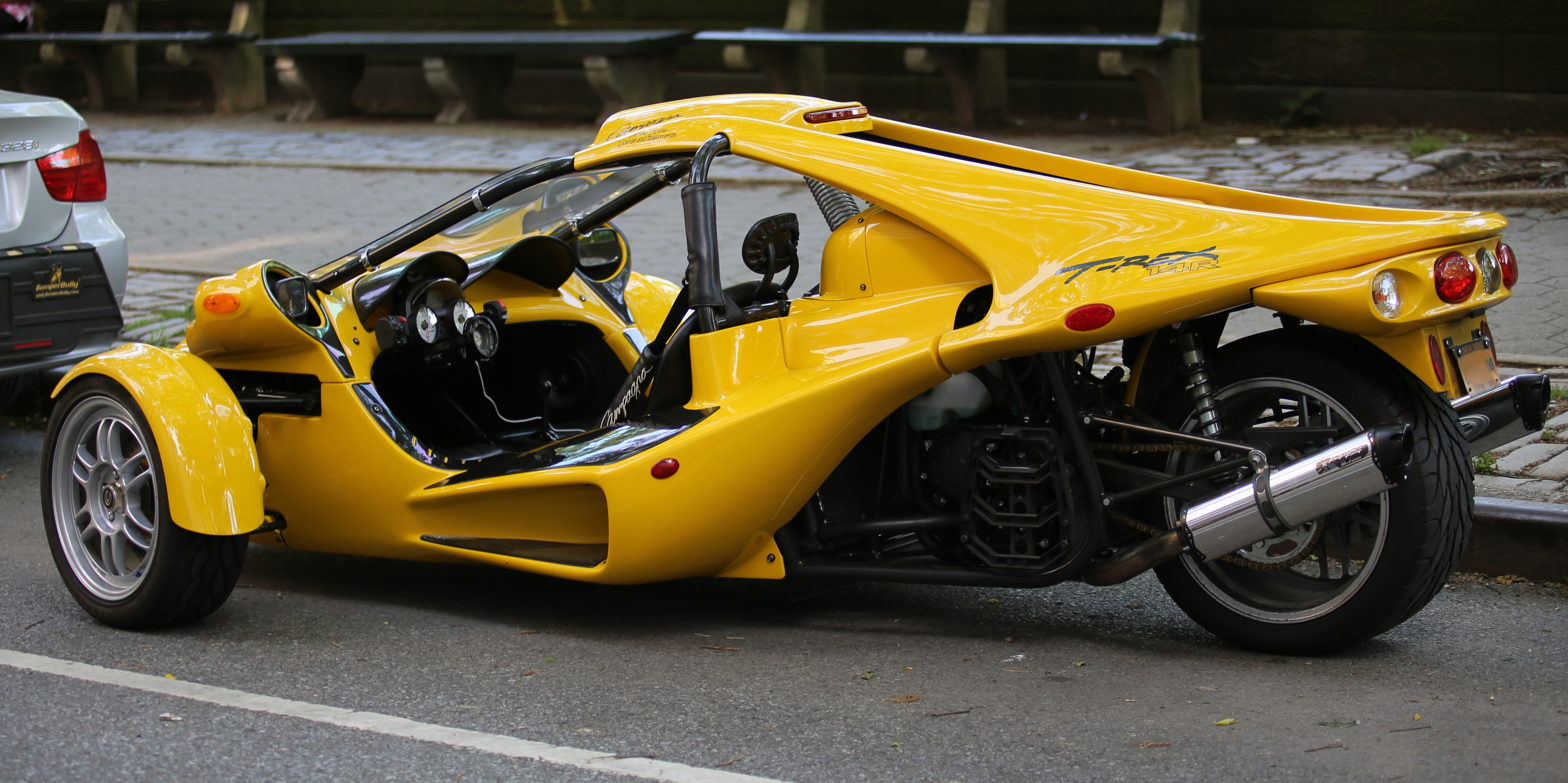
Campagna T-Rex rear ¾ view

In 1976, 1977 and 1979, Daniel Campagna was a Formula Ford racer in Quebec. He made some significant motoring inventions, including the Voodoo in 1982. As part of the technical team for Formula 1 racer Gilles Villeneuve, he handcrafted his first model of the T-REX and subsequently founded his own company, Campagna Moto Sport Inc. in 1990. He brought together a production team and the prototype vehicle was finalized a few years later.

From 1994 to 2000, the T-REX was only available in Quebec, but since the early 2000s it has been sold in the rest of Canada and the United States. In June 2004, the company was facing financial difficulties, and it granted an exclusive worldwide licence to manufacture and sell the T-Rex to T-Rex Vehicles Inc. Due to this arrangement, the company claims that production costs have been reduced by 20% without much difficulty.

In 2001, the T-REX entered the U.S. market, including California CARB certification by 2002.

Since July 2009, the company has 23 employees producing two to three T-REX vehicles per week.

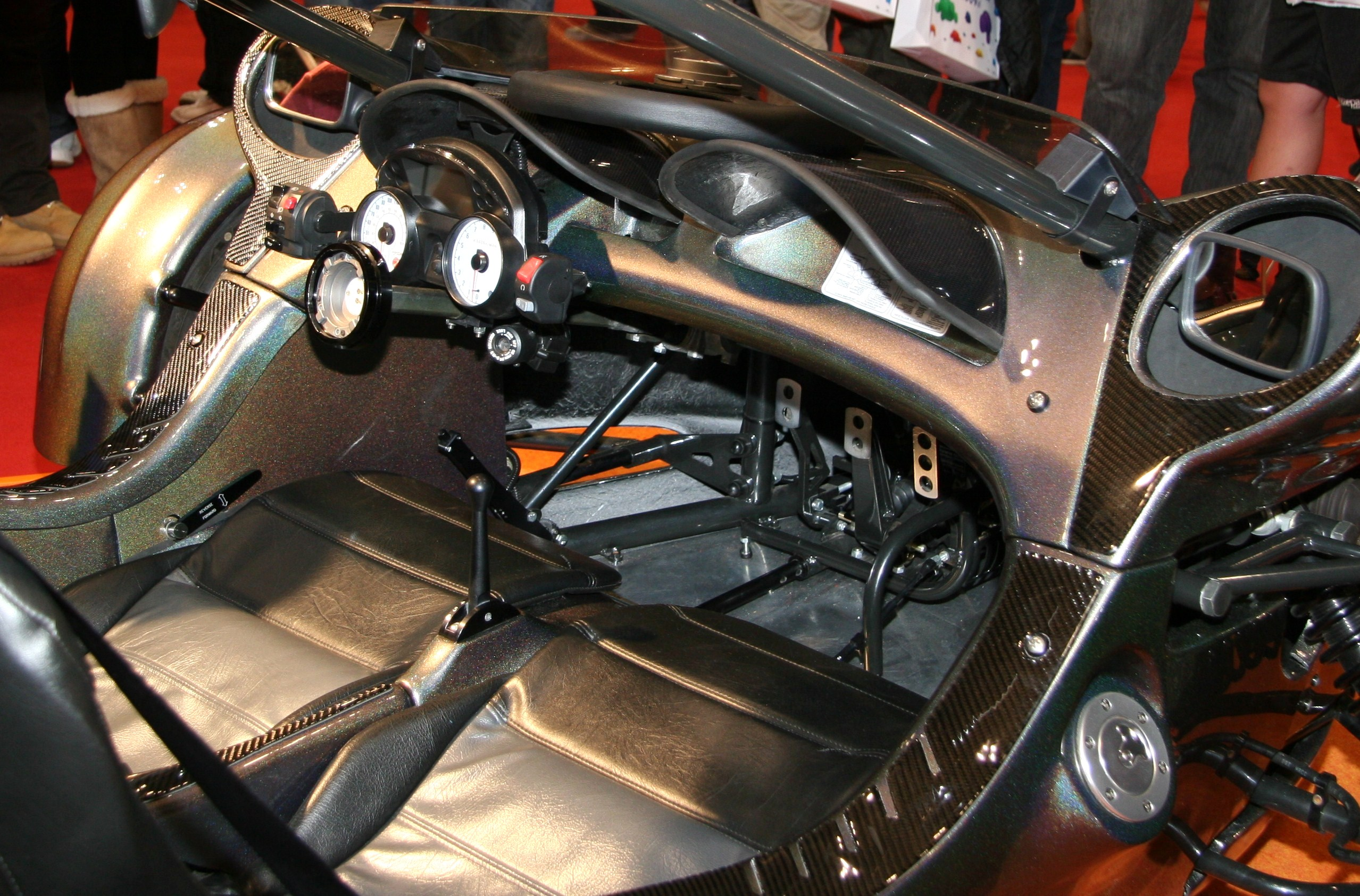
Interior

As of 2016, the T-REX was still in production, and since 2011 the company also offered the V13R. Most sales are in Quebec, Canada, and the biggest export market has been the Middle East.

== Engines ==
Over the course of its production these are some of the different engines that have been used.

- Suzuki GSX-R1100 engines
- Kawasaki ZX-11
- Kawasaki ZX-12R
- BMW K1600

== See also ==
- List of motorized trikes
