= Bicycling and feminism =

Impact of the bicycle on women's lives

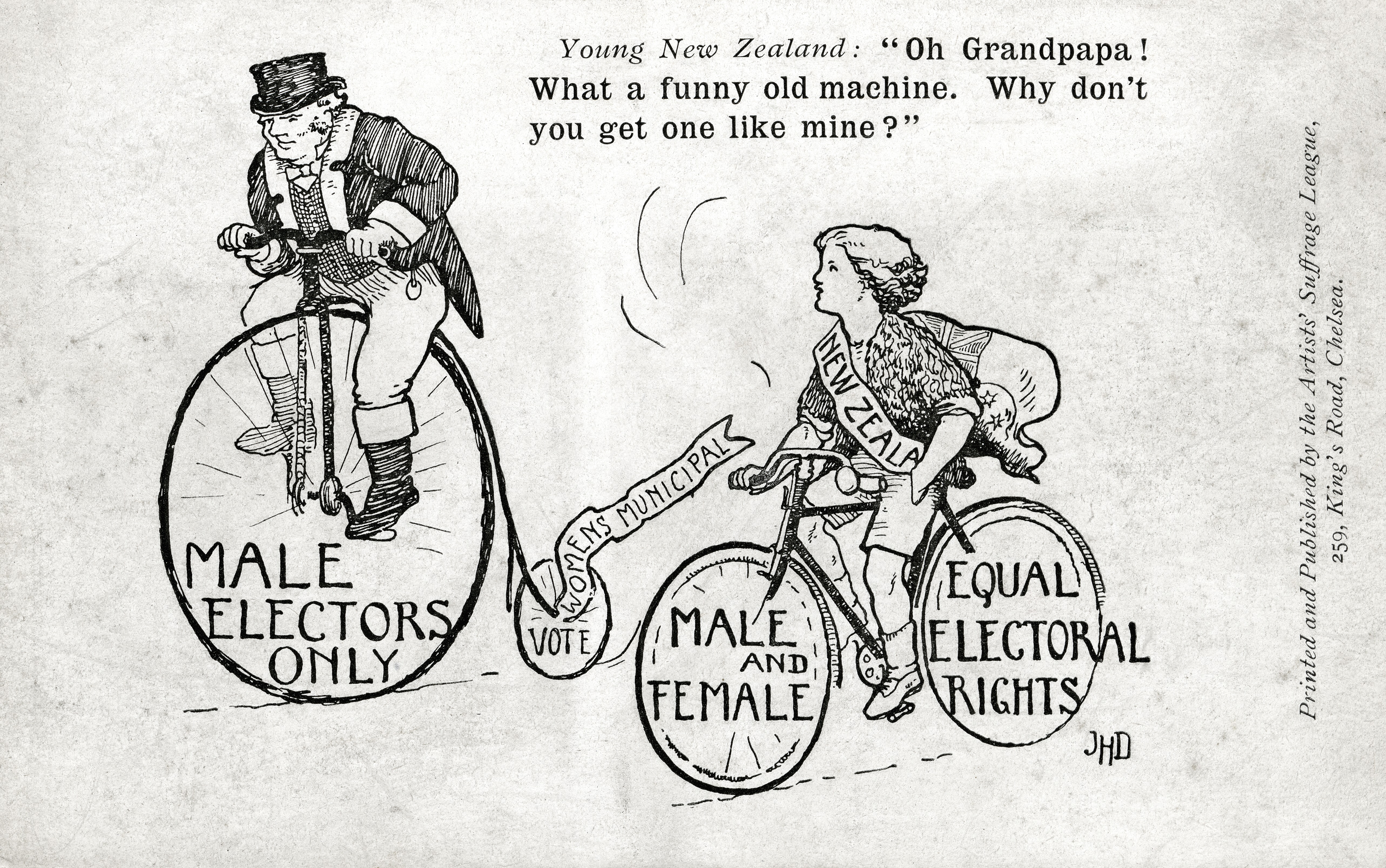
New Zealand postcard advocating equal voting rights for women. Note that women could already vote in local elections (the small wheel of the penny-farthing)

The bicycle has had a significant impact on the lives of women in a variety of areas. The greatest impact the bicycle had on the societal role of women occurred in the 1890s during the bicycle craze that swept American and European society. During this time, the primary achievement the bicycle gained for the women's movement was that it gave women a greater amount of social mobility. The feminist Annie Londonderry accomplished her around-the-globe bicycle trip as the first woman in this time. Due to the price and the various payment plans offered by American bicycle companies, the bicycle was affordable to the majority of people. However, the bicycle impacted upper and middle class white women the most. This transformed their role in society from remaining in the private or domestic sphere as caregivers, wives, and mothers to one of greater public appearance and involvement in the community. In the 21st century bicycling remains a contentious issue in countries such as Afghanistan,; Iran,; and Saudi Arabia.

== History ==
=== Dandyhorses: pre-1860s ===
Dandyhorses were invented in 1817 and were very fashionable for a couple of years. They could move at about twice walking speed. They had no pedals or cranks, but were propelled with the feet like a modern balance bicycle. Denis Johnson sold a ladies' version with a step-through frame.

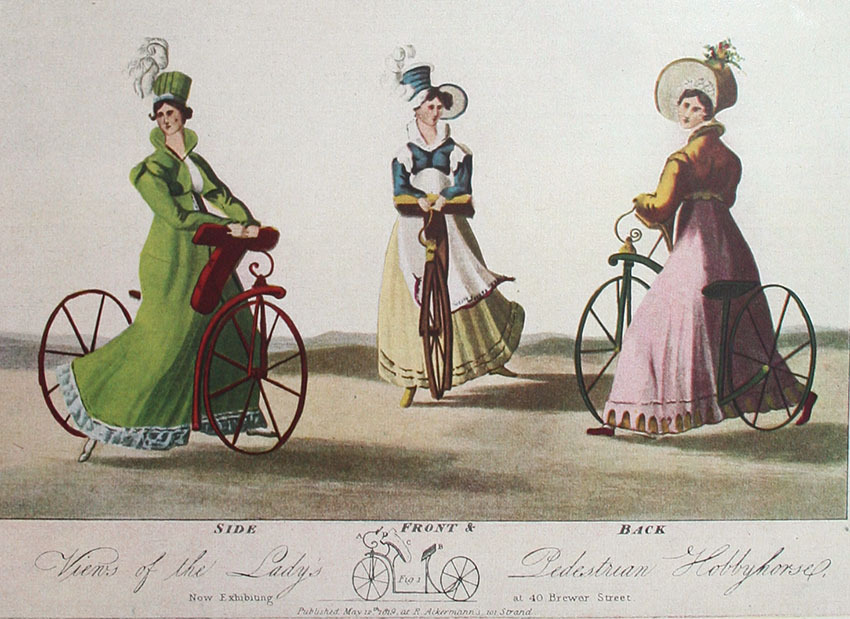
Johnson’s Ladies’ Walking Machine, sold in London 1818-1819, had a step-through frame to accommodate skirts

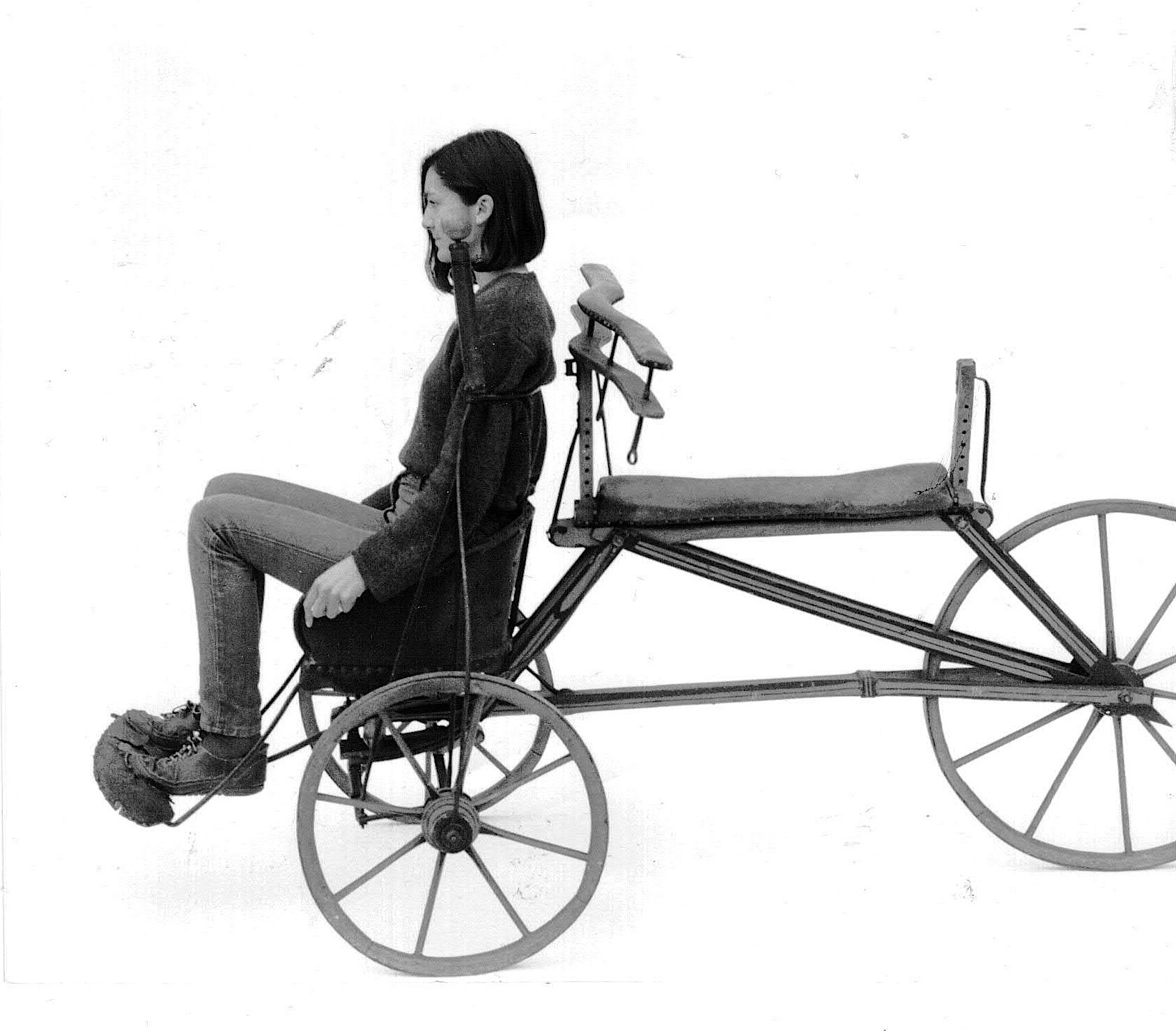
A tricycle draisine with a front-facing seat for a female passenger.

=== Velocipedes: 1860s to mid-1880s ===
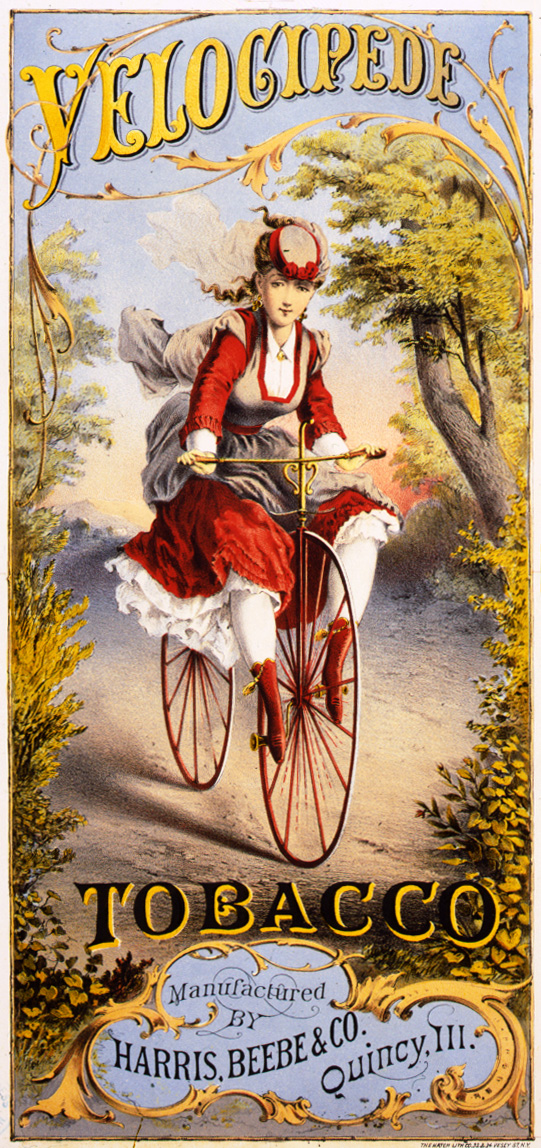
Velocipede, tobacco label, 1874.

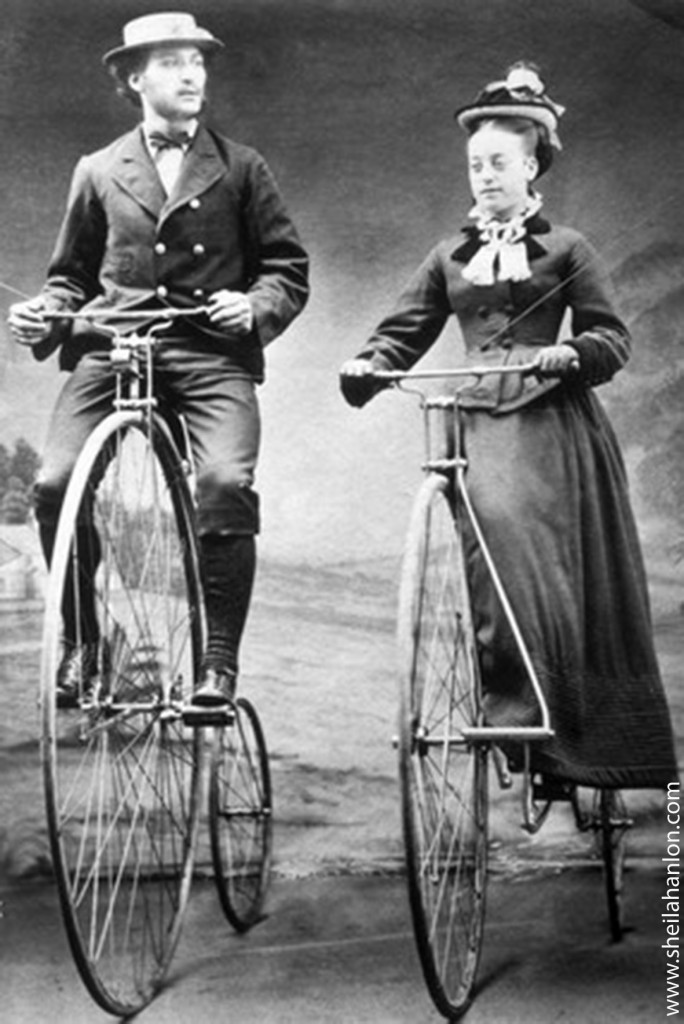
An Ariel highwheeler and the Lady Ariel, an 1874 design intended for the use of ladies in riding habits. It has a noseless sidesaddle, asymmetrical handlebars, a treadle instead of pedals, and non-inline wheels. It is not clear if it was practical enough to be used.

Between the 1860s and the mid-1880s, the standard bicycle was the ordinary or high wheeler, which was both hard to master and dangerous to use. While the ordinary was exclusively used by men, women were allowed to use bicycles such as the two-seater sociable, the tandem bicycle, and the tricycle. Beginning in the late 1860s companionate riding became a popular social activity for men and women. These vehicles allowed men and women to develop new methods of coed socialization. However, up until the mid-1880s, women were primarily dependent upon men in order to participate in cycling. The presence of a man in control of the sociable assumed that the man could keep the woman safe from the dangers of riding a bike alone, thereby assuming the authority of man. So while companionate riding was revolutionary in the development in sociability between men and women, it kept women in an inferior position to men by assuming that the man had the power over the bicycle in that situation.

=== Bicycle craze ===
In the mid-1880s to mid-1890s, the modern safety bicycle was developed. Bicycling became widely popular.

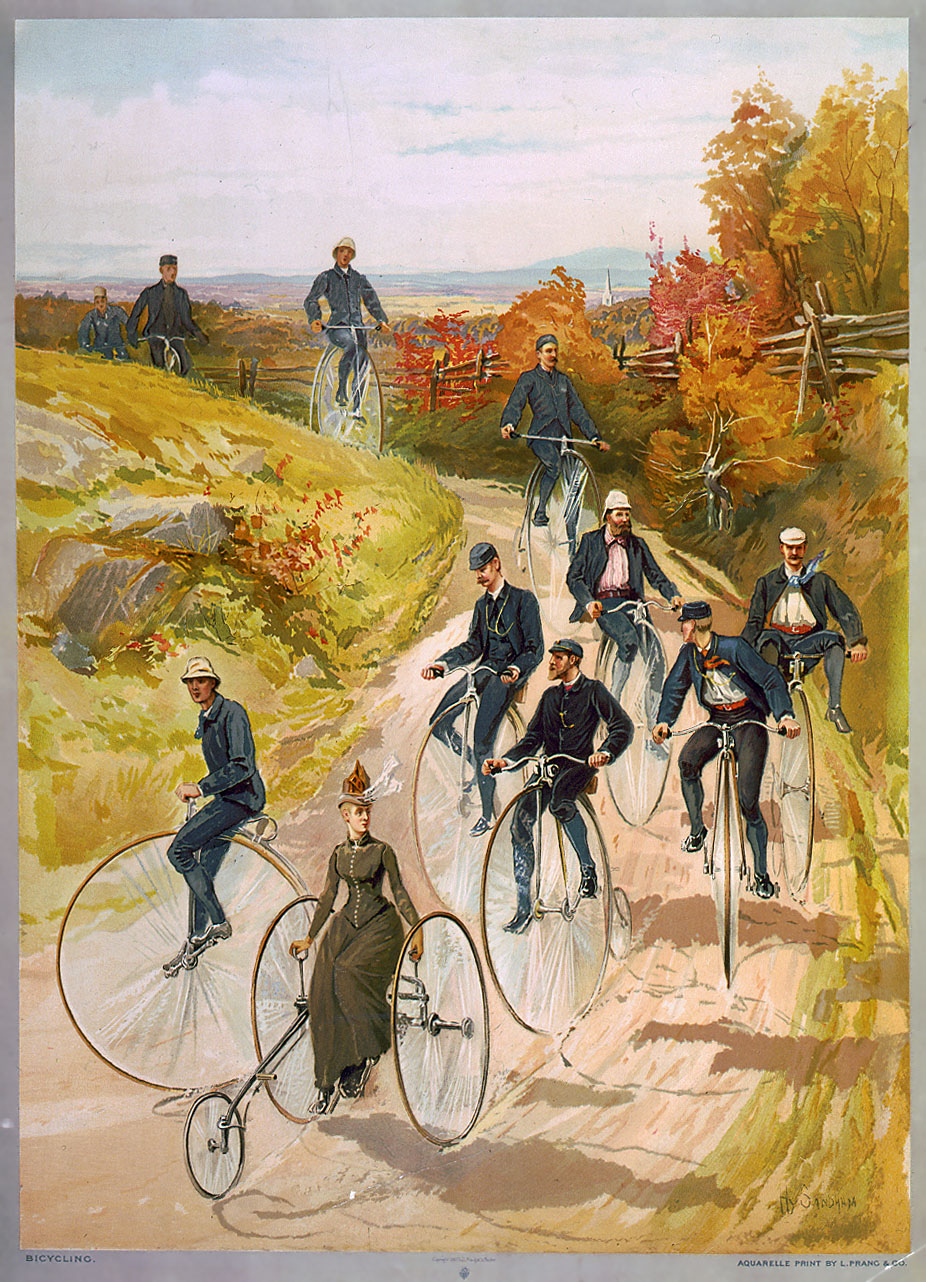
"Bicycling", a ca. 1887 color print showing one of the few ways in which it was socially acceptable for women to ride cycles, in the years before the invention of "safety bicycles" and the woman's "bicycle suit".

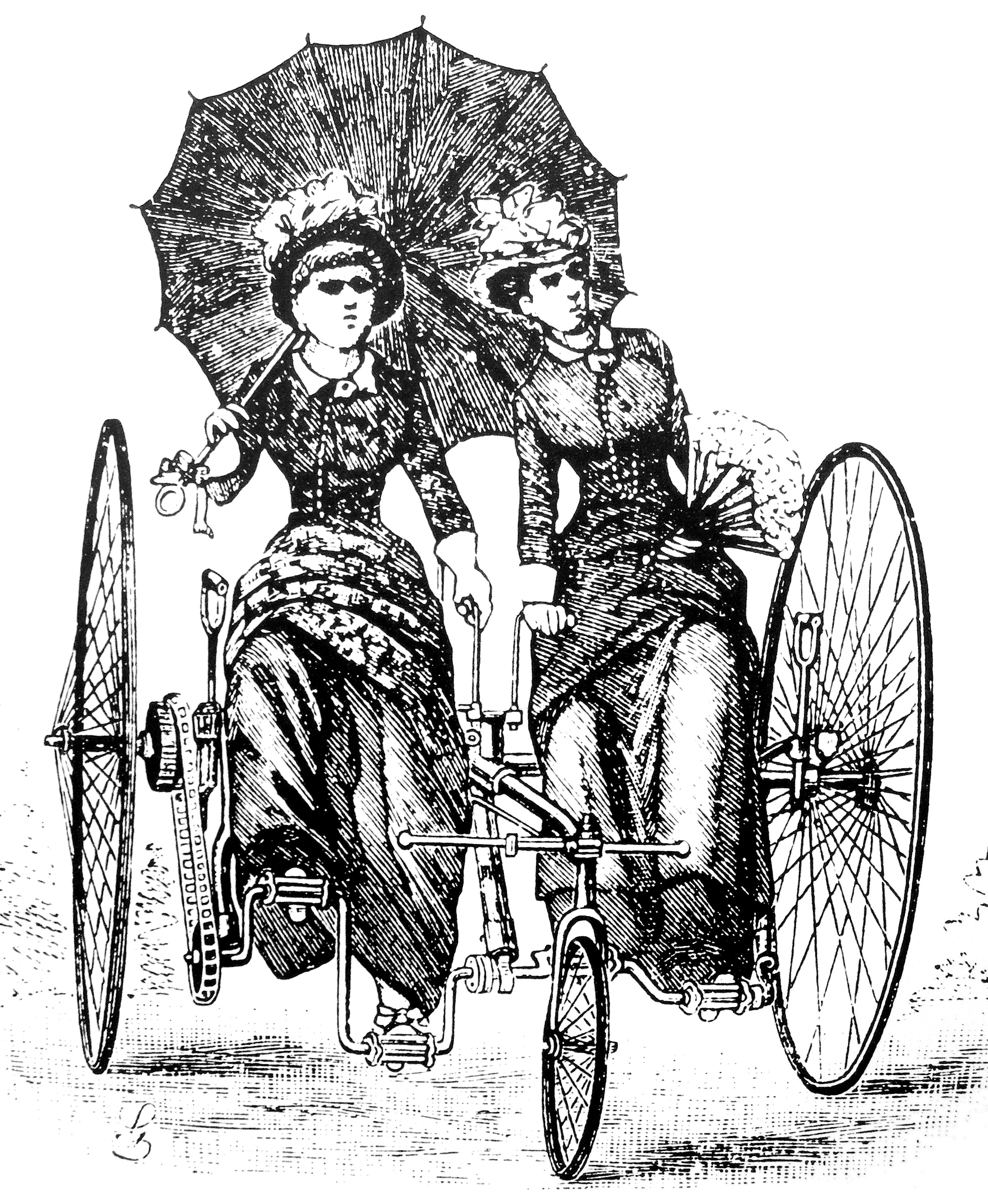
Sociable, 1886; more recreation than transport

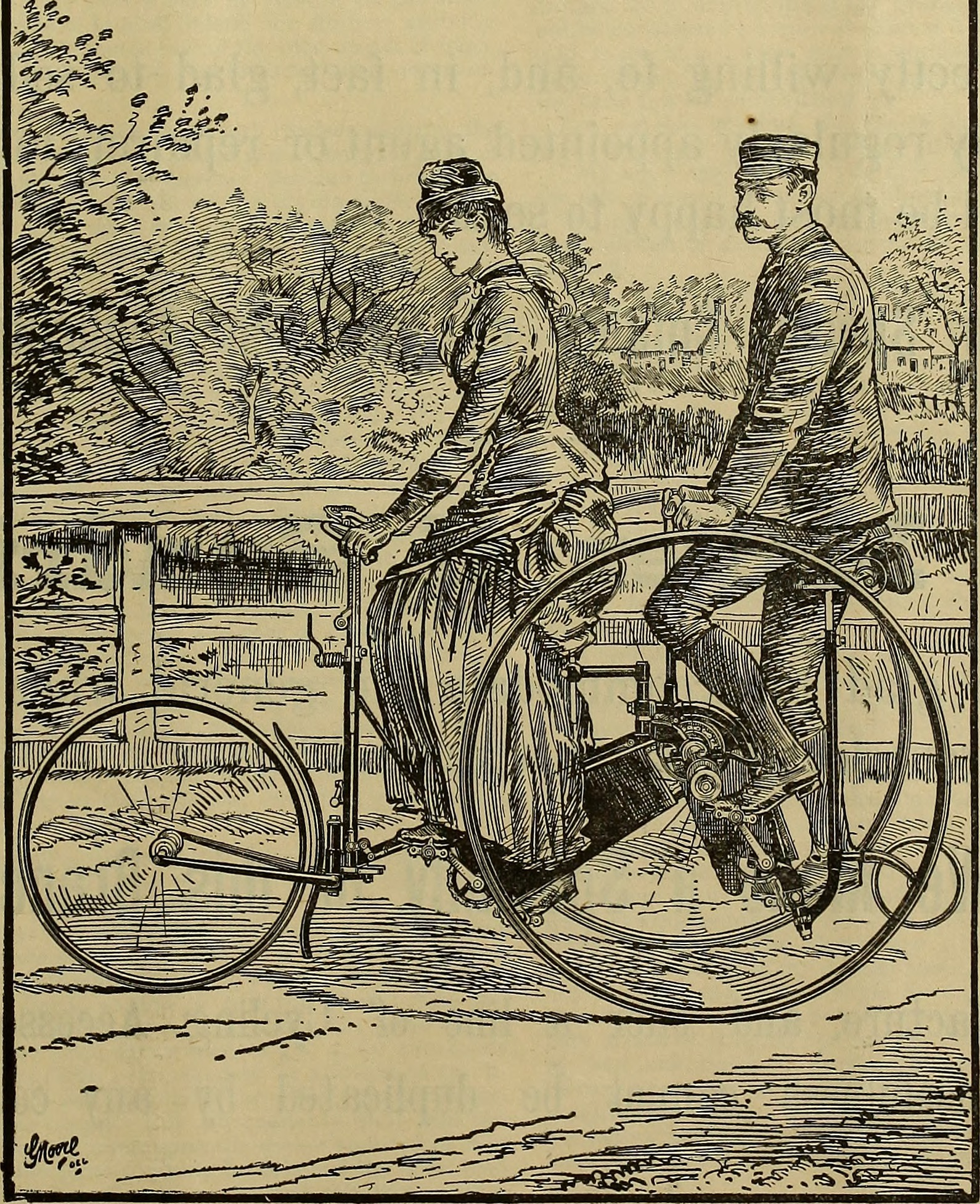
Tandem tricycle, Suitable for ladies or gentlemen - safe, practicable, fast. The bicycling world, 16 Sept., 1887.

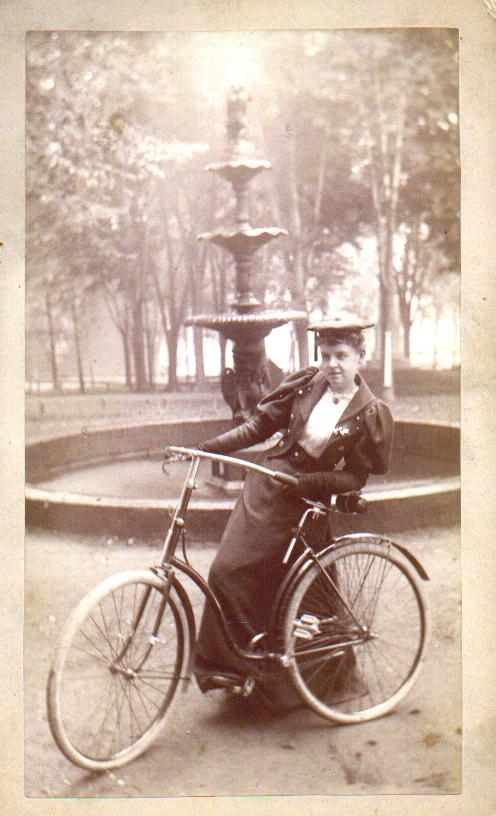
Woman with a safety bicycle, 1890s.

==== Ottoman Empire ====
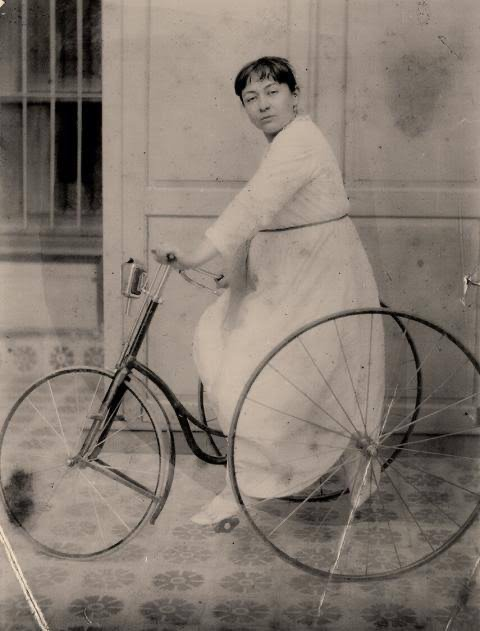
Fatma Aliye Topuz riding a tricycle, apparently while pregnant, circa 1900

According to Alon Raab, a professor of Religious Studies at UC Davis, opposition to cycling in the Ottoman Empire was quick from conservatives and religious fundamentalists, who frequently criticized bicycles as the Devil's Chariot. Orthodox scholars claimed that cycling would harm reproductive organs, embolden sexual permissiveness and lead to the destruction of the family. Raab additionally notes that their unmentioned objective was to keep women in their homes and to restrict nonsupervised contact between men and women. Raab reports that many Muslim religious authorities castigated women's cycling as bid'ah (any technical innovation deemed heretical). He points out that women's cycling was criticized in the media and by law, and in some places, female cyclists faced physical assaults. He reports that despite opposition, in the early 20th century, women in the Ottoman Empire nevertheless went on to adopt cycling for varied purposes with a new sense of freedom. Feminist activists' efforts to expand the political rights of women, like those of Fatma Aliye Topuz, were helped along by the bicycle.

== Clothing ==
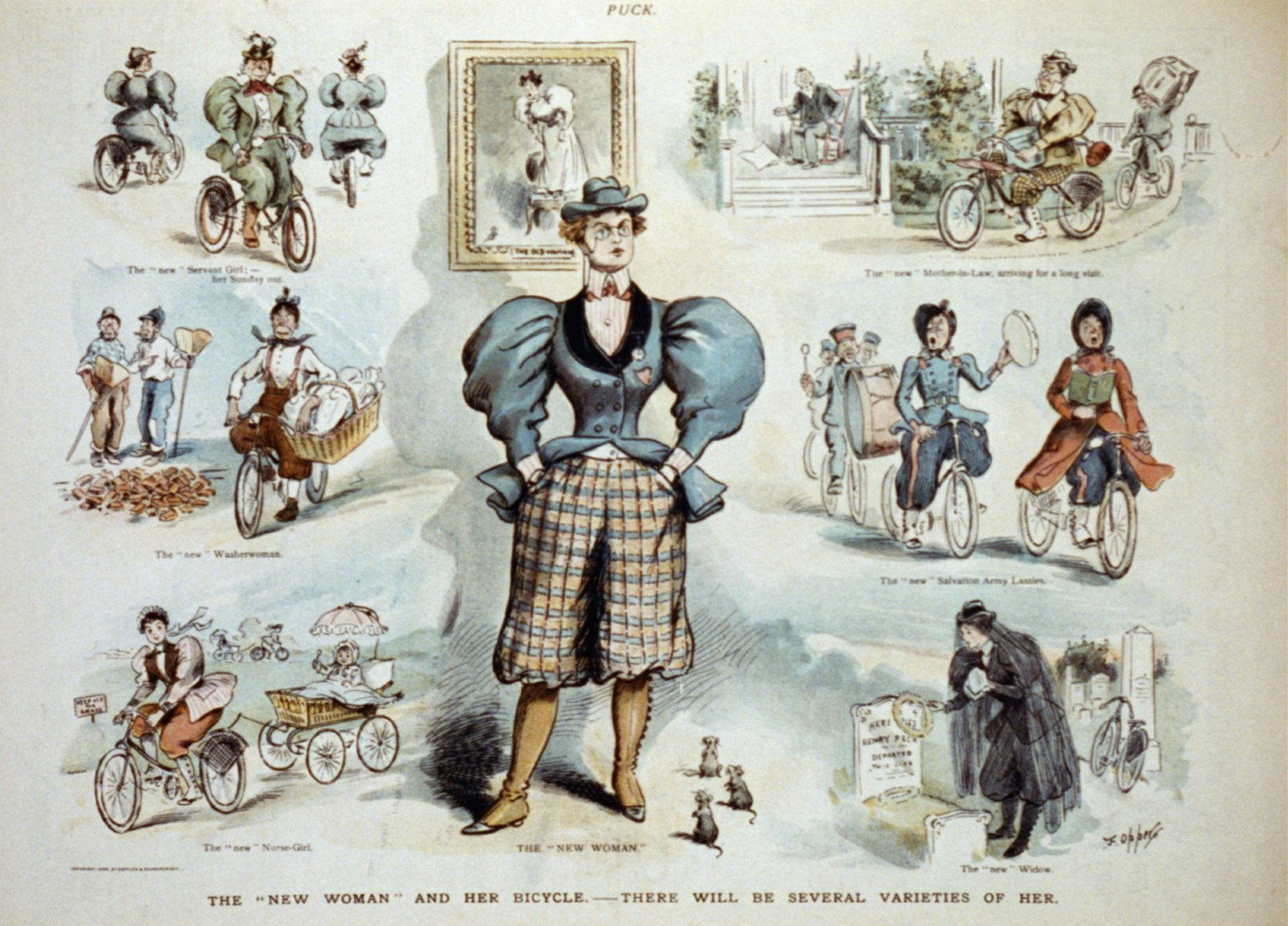
The "new woman" and her bicycle - there will be several varieties of her (1895) - F. Opper.

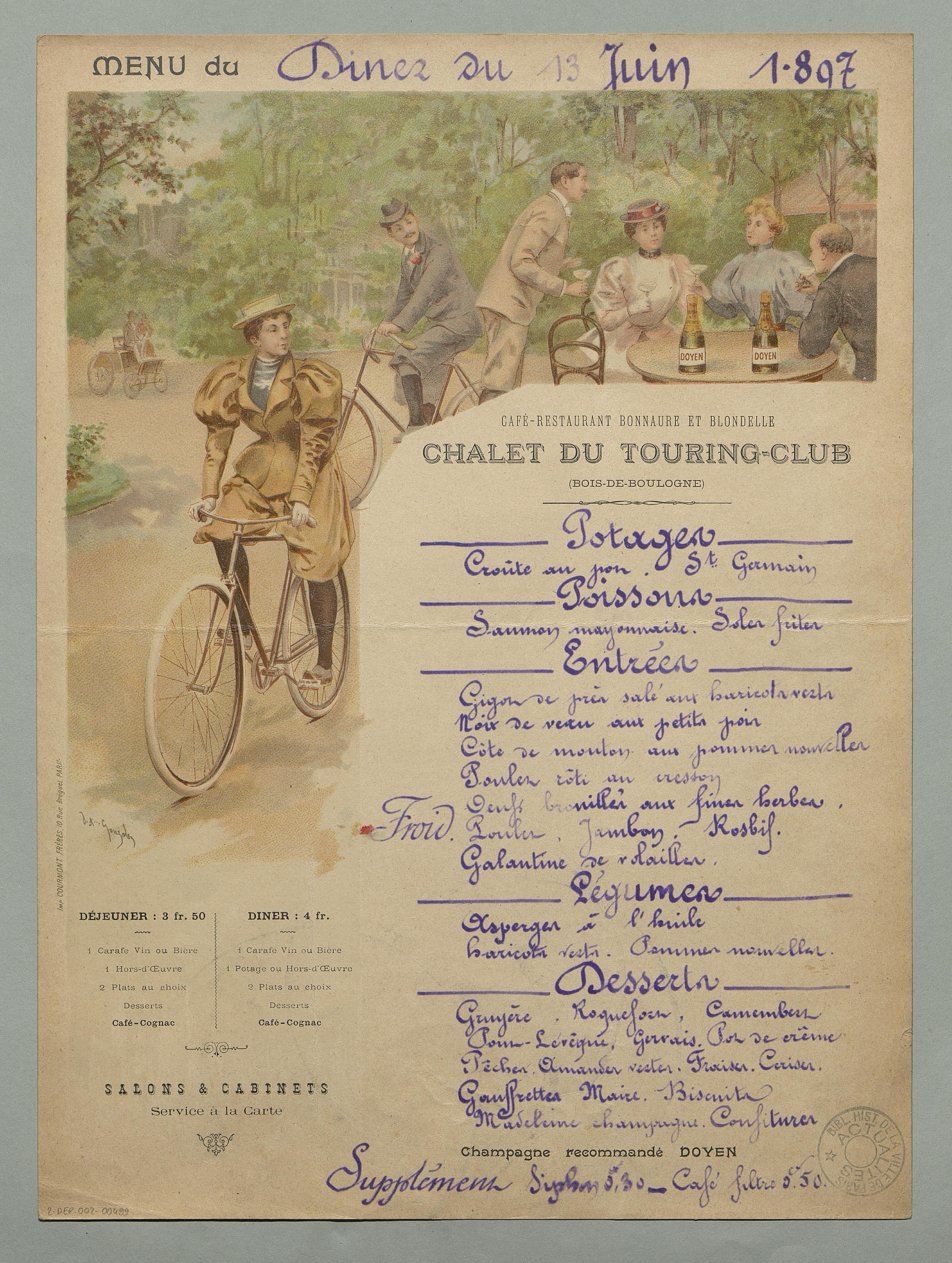
Café-Restaurant Bonnaure et Blondelle Chalet du Touring-Club - Bois de Boulogne, Commercial documents of restaurants in Paris and Ile de France. One can see a female cyclist in bloomers.

Between 1885 and 1895, inventors and engineers vastly improved the previous generation of bicycle to what was then called safety bicycle. With these developments, a type of safety bicycle was designed for women in particular with a drop frame in order to accommodate women's clothes. However, the long skirts and the tight-fitted bodices of this time period made cycling an even greater challenge. Therefore, several modified outfits were offered to women that would accommodate the bicycle. Some modifications included divided skirts, skirts that shortened with drawstrings, skirts that converted to bloomers, skirt-securing devices that kept the fabric close to the ankle, and a bicycle corset consisting of a sturdy, straight under-bodice with extra back support and a looser fit. Of all the bicycle costumes, the bloomer costume was and still is the most widely known from this time period. This consisted of full trousers, gathered at the ankle, worn with a calf-length skirt with a fashionable jacket on top.

These clothes were met with mixed approval. Elizabeth Cady Stanton in her notes on whether or not women should ride a bicycle stated, "To sum up, I would say, let women ride .... If some prefer the [bulk] skirts flying in the wind exhausted in the wheels let them run the risk of their folly; If others prefer bloomers let them enjoy their choice- if others prefer knickerbockers, leave them in peace." In instructive books written for women on how to ride a bicycle, many authors insist that wearing bicycle costumes made it easier to ride. In both cases, it seems that the decision to wear these athletic costumes was a personal choice for women. By making this choice, women to a small degree were able to take control of their life. At the same time, it was presented as a rational choice as wearing the full fashion of the time could make cycling more difficult for the rider. Because of this the decision to wear these clothes was closely related to the decision to ride a bicycle.

For the most part, men were the main opponents of women wearing bicycle clothing and in particular, bloomers. This can be seen in a lot of songs from this time period. For example, a rendition of "Mary Had a Little Lamb" from 1895 written by Stanislaus Stange had a verse that went:

"Dear Mary," said the little lamb,
"It gives me quite a fright
To see the girls on bicycles,
They're such a novel sight.
Why is it they all Bloomers wear?
The sight my blood congeals."
Then Mary touched her forehead thus,
And gently murmured: "Wheels."

In this case, the very idea of the bicycle suit and women's potential to wear it disturbed some men. They saw these suits and in particular bloomers as ugly or shameful. In particular, they saw these bicycle costumes as a physical representation of women stealing men's characteristics, thereby blurring the lines between femininity and masculinity and what is socially acceptable for each group. What this fear reveals is a realistic notion that women were taking on a greater role of independence of which had previously been characterized as masculine.

To address modesty concerns, a proposed Iranian version of a women's bicycle would have a "boxy contraption that hides a woman's lower body".

== Health ==
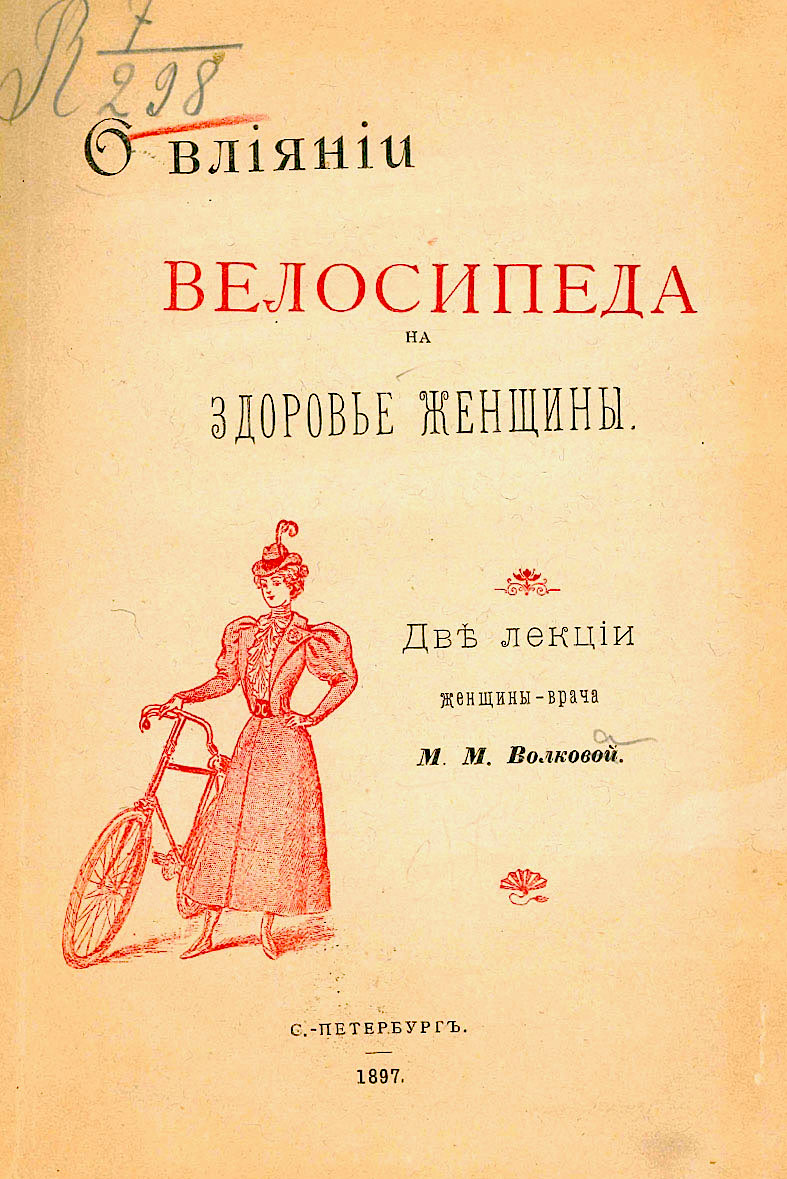
Lectures of the female gynaecologist Volkova about influence of the bicycle on health of the woman (1897).

During the late nineteenth century, doctors began encouraging everyone in public to exercise more often and cycling became a popular activity in which to do so. However, doctors were worried about the effects of excessive cycling, particularly how it affected women. An 1895 article in The Literary Digest reviewed literature from the time period, which discussed the bicycle face, and noted that The Springfield Republican warned against excessive cycling by "women, girls, and middle-aged men." The bicycle face was described as a face usually flushed, but sometimes pale, often with lips more or less drawn, and the beginning of dark shadows under the eyes, and always an expression of weariness. These articles pushed forth the belief that excessive cycling made women vulnerable to many diseases such as developing an exophthalmic goiter, appendicitis, and internal inflammation. His article was subsequently discussed and analyzed in The Advertiser.

Another concern doctors had about women riding the bicycle was over their sexual health. Doctors believed that the bicycle saddle taught masturbation to women and girls. Riding astride anything was seen as too masculine for any proper woman. These physicians wrote in detail in medical journals about how the bicycle could be used for masturbation:

The saddle can be tilted in every bicycle as desired… In this way a girl… could, by carrying the front peak or pommel high, or by relaxing the stretched leather in order to let it form a deep, hammock-like concavity which would fit itself snugly over the entire vulva and reach up in front, bring about constant friction over the clitoris and labia. This pressure would be much increased by stooping forward and the warmth generated from vigorous exercise might further increase feeling.

These doctors were not concerned with sexual health, but rather sexual morality. Young women were supposed to be chaste and pure. They were trained from a young age to guard their sexual innocence. The fact that the bicycle had potential to awaken sexual feelings in women not only threatened their sexual purity, but also threatened to destroy gender definitions of sexual morality. Therefore, the bicycle is seen again as blurring the definition of masculine and feminine characteristics.

At the same time as male doctors were stating the capabilities of women and the weakness of their bodies in relation to the bicycle, bicycle enthusiasts disagreed with this medical assessment, and asserted that the physical activity was good to improve one's health and vitality. Women began to express what their bodies were capable of through magazine articles. Women like Mary Bisland, Mary Sargent Hopkins, and Emma Moffett Tyng contested medical commonplaces and promoted new ones in their place. These women stated that cycling brought long-inactive muscles back to life, and helped riders feel better emotionally and encouraged women to use their own experiences with the bicycle to determine their physical limits. These women brought to public attention the positive aspects that help women riders. The bicycle not only makes them literally stronger, but also makes them more confident in their own abilities. This in turn not only gives women a greater agency over their body, but also mentally strengthens them to take on their previous domestic role and explore new roles in the public sphere.

The 1977 book Women in the Arab World by the Egyptian feminist Nawal El Saadawi, reports that Arab culture used to place undue importance on female virginity. For example, a girl whose hymen was damaged as a result of sports activities like cycling or horse riding had to face negative consequences in her family life and social stature.

== Solo female bicycle travelers ==
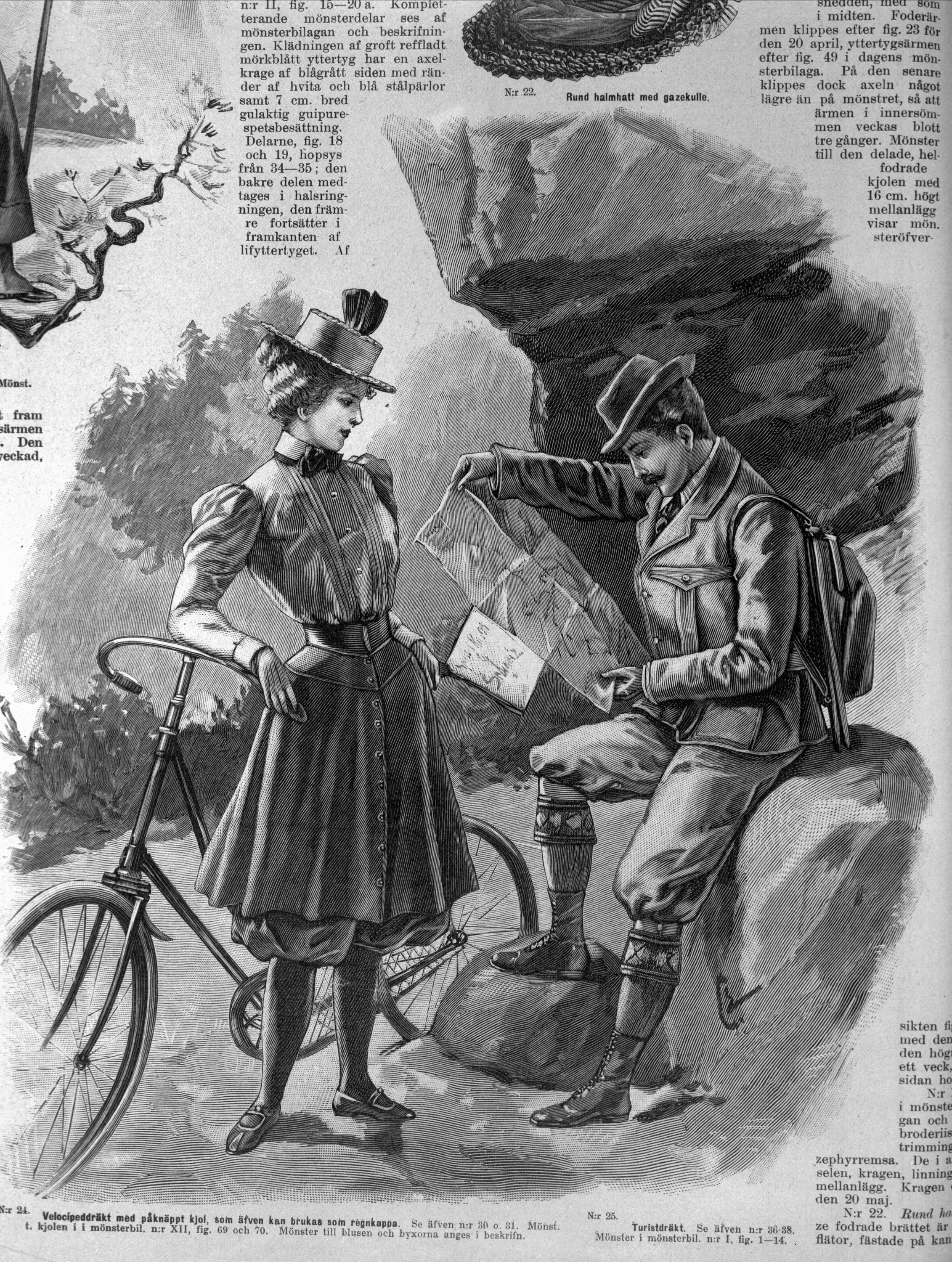
Woman in bicycle clothes and buttoned on skirt that also can be used as raincoat

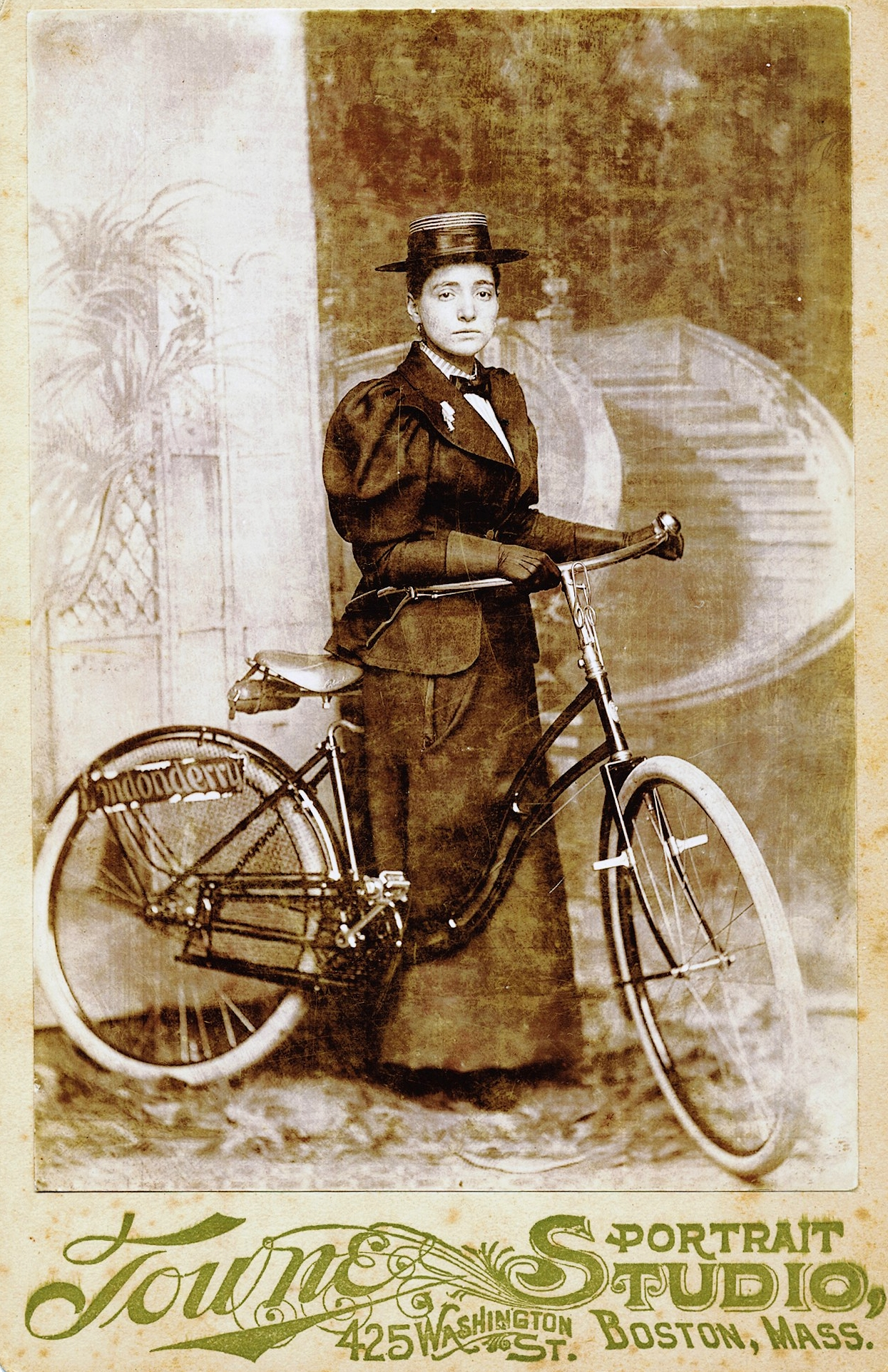
Annie Londonderry in 1896

Bicycle touring is a type of adventure travel, whereby a traveler uses a bicycle as the major means of transportation. A bicycle traveler might also use panniers to transport her equipment. Such travel can be almost completely self-sustained and autonomous, once the equipment includes a tent, cooking tools, a medical pack, repair tools, cooking fuel, water containers and multiple days of food supplies. Women Cycle the World is one of the many websites, which offer a list solo female long-distance cyclists and their blog. For instance, Rebecca Lowe crossed Iran, Dervla Murphy crossed Afghanistan and Helen Lloyd crossed Africa. The book WOW—Women on Wheels by solo female cycle traveler Loretta Henderson reported a global number of 245 solo female cycle travelers. Annie Londonderry is the first woman to have cycled the world as early as in 1894–95.

Issues of safety and security for solo female long-distance cyclists are often raised by those meeting them for the first time. Such sources often come off with encouraging answers and useful advice, such as researching road and destination, staying visible on the road, and planning lodging options such as camping, bed and breakfast and warm showers ahead. Around the world cycling record breaking Jenny Graham was even advised to carry a firearm in Yukon due to the 'bear season'. She got along with "three bells, a whistle, flash lights on the front and back of her bike and bear spray" instead of a firearm.

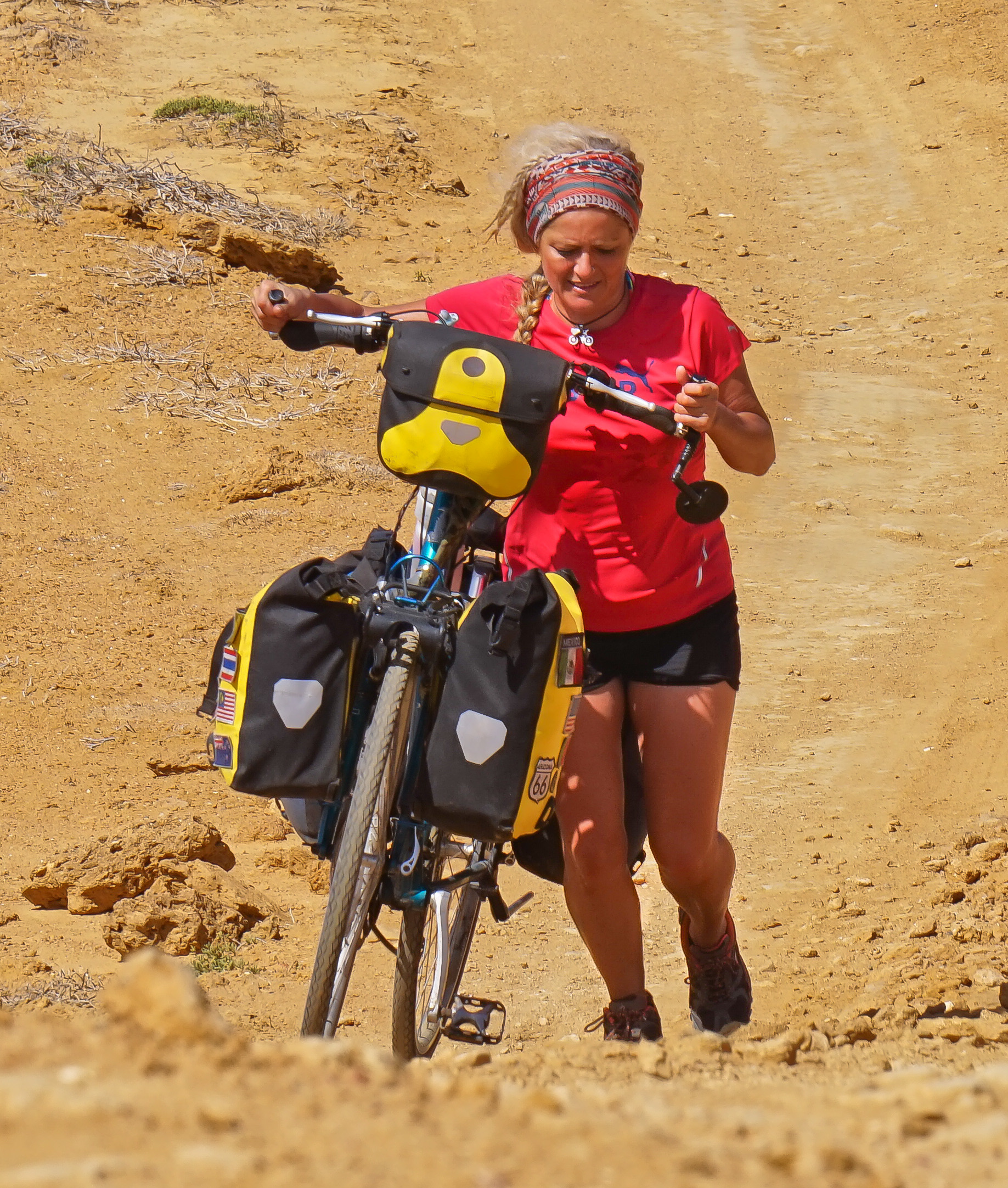
Cristina Spínola in Punta Gallinas, Colombia in 2015

List of solo female cycle world circumnavigators
Name	Birth year	Nationality
Annie Londonderry	1870	Jewish-Latvian-American
Dervla Murphy	1931	Irish
Anne Mustoe	1933	English
Josie Dew	1966	English
Cristina Spínola	1976	Spanish
Jenny Graham	1979 or 1980	Scottish
Juliana Buhring	1981	British-German
Sana Iqbal	1987	Indian
Vedangi Kulkarni	1998	Indian

== Gender gap ==
According to Jennifer Bonham and Kat Jungnicke, much of the gender and cycling literature looks at the reasons behind the uneven uptake among diverse populations. Bonham and Jungnicke state that women may be behind in numbers among cyclists of low-cycling countries like Australia, Brazil, Canada, Chile, the UK and the US, but they have very similar numbers to men in high-cycling countries like the Netherlands and Denmark. That makes it incorrect to infer that women have any natural aversion to ride bikes.

== Bicycle rallies in 21st-century Pakistan ==
Being influenced by sexualized patriarchal culture, various levels of seclusion of women from public participation are practiced in Pakistan. Taboos may require women to sit in a particular manner, not ride a bicycle, and limit public contact. Since the first Aurat March (an International Women's Day march) in 2018, women's bicycle rallies in Karachi were started. On International Women's Day 2021, around 150 women of various backgrounds participated in the bicycle ride.

== Publications ==
During the 1890s, many women and some men wrote self-help books in order to help women learn how to ride a bicycle. Within these books, they gave tips and personal reflections about the impact of the bicycle on their lives. Frances Elizabeth Willard, the national president of the Woman's Christian Temperance Union (WCTU) wrote a book called A Wheel Within A Wheel, in which she discusses the exhilaration and health benefits she received by learning to ride as well as how she used cycling as a compelling social activity to stop men and women from drinking.

Elizabeth Cady Stanton wrote that the bicycle was a tool which motivated women to gain strength and take on increased roles in society. Susan B. Anthony stated in 1896: "Let me tell you what I think of bicycling. I think it has done more to emancipate women than anything else in the world. I stand and rejoice every time I see a woman ride by on a wheel."

Beatrice Grimshaw, who went on to a life of travel and adventure, describes a girlhood of Victorian propriety, in which she was: "the Revolting Daughter–as they called them then. I bought a bicycle, with difficulty. I rode it unchaperoned, mile and miles beyond the limits possible to the soberly trotting horses. The world opened before me. And as soon as my twenty-first birthday dawned, I went away from home, to see what the world might to give to daughters who revolted."

Within the experiences of all these women, they indicate a similar experience of the world opening up to them. In the literal sense, they could leave the private sphere for the public sphere and in doing so escape the cult of domesticity in which societal norms kept them imprisoned. At the same time, they see the potential for new opportunities in which women can take an active role within their community. Through these readings, the women begin to see their potential as active and independent members of society.

== Contemporary legal status ==
In Afghanistan, under Taliban rule, women are not specifically banned from cycling, but other prohibitions — such as having to dress conservatively, and only leave the house with a male guardian — make cycling extremely difficult.

In Saudi Arabia, women are banned from cycling for transportation purposes. Cycling may be used only for recreation and is subject to various religious restrictions.

In Iran, cycling in public spaces has been banned under a fatwa since 2016 despite widespread resistance amongst Iranian women. Advocates of women cyclists have been attacked by vigilantes.

== See also ==
- Bike boom – Historic periods marked by increased bicycle enthusiasm, popularity, and sales
- Cyclability – Degree of ease of cycling
- Fancy Women Bike Ride – Cycling tour
- Feminist urbanism – Urban planning theory focused on women
- History of the bicycle – Development of bicycle technology
- Ovarian Psycos – Bicycle brigade
- Timeline of women's legal rights (other than voting)
- Victorian dress reform – Victorian era design movement favouring practical women's clothing
- Women and bicycling in Islam – Women biking or bicycling in Muslim world
