= Ed Pratt =

British unicyclist and circumnavigator

- Born: Edward Stuart Pratt; 8 December 1995 (age 30)

YouTube information
- Channel: EdPratt
- Years active: 2014 – present
- Subscribers: 582 thousand
- Views: 105.1 million
- Last updated: 14 April 2026

Edward Stuart Pratt (born 8 December 1995) is a British YouTuber. Between 2015 and 2018, he circumnavigated the globe by unicycle, and in 2023 he started a series of "Source to Sea" journeys where he attempts to travel the length of rivers, only allowing himself to make progress while in the river.

== World unicycle tour ==
In March 2015, 19-year-old Pratt set off from his home in Curry Rivel, Somerset, to circumnavigate the globe by unicycle. During the challenge, he cycled approximately 21,000 miles (33,800 km) and returned home three-and-a-half years later. He filmed his trip and posted videos about it on his YouTube channel.

Pratt's route took him from the UK through Europe to Turkey, through Asia via a Caspian Sea ferry and south-east Asia to Singapore before flying to Perth. He cycled across Australia to Sydney, and flew to New Zealand's South Island. From Auckland, he flew to San Francisco and traversed the U.S. before flying from New York to Edinburgh. His final cycle took him south from Scotland to Chilthorne Domer in Somerset, England. During the journey, Pratt taught English as a foreign language in Bishkek, Kyrgyzstan, for six months. In Australia, Pratt met Mark Beaumont who was on his world record attempt around the world.

He ended at the headquarters of School in a Bag, a local charity providing backpacks containing educational tools and materials for poor and vulnerable children around the world, for which he raised over £300,000 during the challenge. Pratt arrived back home in July 2018. In October 2018 he was awarded the 1015th Points of Light award and was commended by British Prime Minister Theresa May through a letter.

In 2020, Pratt acknowledged that he did not follow Guinness World Record regulations he had been given, citing his extended stay in Kyrgyzstan due to harsh winter weather and a near car accident in Kazakhstan earlier and missing the second mandated antipodal point in Madrid (the other being Auckland). Instead, Pratt said that he stuck to his own rules which required him to only progress under his own power by cycling, walking, or pushing the unicycle at steep sections and stated that he took pride in knowing that "apart from the watery bits, there's an unbroken unicycle tire track around the entire planet". In the video, Pratt corrected news outlets that reported that he was the first person to circumnavigate the earth on a unicycle as he hadn't fully completed it officially and also acknowledged the earlier attempt by Wally Watts in the 1970s, which Pratt said had originally inspired him, and interviewed Watts for a video.

== "Source to Sea" ==
In 2023, Pratt travelled from the source of the River Parrett in Somerset to Burnham-on-Sea, where it discharges into the Bristol Channel.

In 2024, he undertook a River Thames "Source to Sea" challenge, travelling the 201 miles (323 km) from Thames Head at Coates, Gloucestershire, to Sheerness on the Thames Estuary.

In 2025, he completed a third "Source to Sea" challenge going down the River Tay, starting at the top of Ben Oss. It took him 28 days to reach his final destination of Broughty Ferry.

== See also ==
- Around the world cycling record#Unicycle
