= Jenny Graham =

Scottish endurance cyclist

Jenny Graham (born 1979 or 1980) is a Scottish endurance cyclist. In 2018 she became the fastest woman to cycle around the world unsupported. In 2024 Lael Wilcox who was supported in her ride, superseded the time taken by Graham by 16 days.

== Biography ==
Graham is part of the Adventure Syndicate (a collective of female endurance cyclists) and a member of Cycling UK. She started cycling in 2004, and was introduced to ultra-distance racing when planning a bike trip to Romania, after coming across the Highland Trail 550.

Graham is from Inverness in Scotland and lives with her son in the Bught area of the city.

In 2017, she was awarded an Adventure Syndicate training bursary place where she met cycling coach John Hampshire. He trained her for a year for free after seeing her potential. After this, she cycled the 750 mile Arizona Trail Race, finishing sixth.

With the Adventure Syndicate, she cycled Land's End to John o' Groats in four days over New Year, spending about 20 hours on the bike each day and mostly riding in the dark. She described the attempt as "brutal" and "absolutely disgusting".

== Record for cycling around the world ==
In June 2018 Graham began an attempt to break the record for a female cycling around the world, only the third woman to take on this challenge. She rode unsupported and carrying all her kit, attempting to break the previous record of 144 days, held by Italian cyclist Paola Gianotti, by completing the 18,000 mile journey across four continents in 110 days. Her route was through 15 countries – Germany, Poland, Latvia, Lithuania, Russia, Mongolia, China, Australia, New Zealand, Canada, US, Portugal, Spain, France and Holland, and includes four flights and a boat. Graham's record attempt was covered by Dotwatcher.cc.

After 23 days, Graham crossed into Russia, and had covered 5,126 miles when crossing into Khongor in Mongolia. At the halfway stage, Graham was in Australia. In late August or early September 2018, Graham reached the Yukon Territory from Alaska, having cycled 12,000 miles of the total journey. A local shopkeeper advised Graham to acquire a firearm to protect herself from hungry bears who were down from the hills for the salmon in the river.

Graham's custom-built bike was donated by the manufacturer Shand Cycles in Livingston, West Lothian. It has a steel frame to absorb shock on the variety of road surfaces along the route. Steven Shand has previously worked with Olympic medalist Sir Chris Hoy to design a keirin bike. Graham's record attempt was also supported by London-based bikepacking bag manufacturer, Apidura, many local people and businesses in the Inverness community, and by the leading US cloud solutions company, Unitas Global Inc.

Jenny arrived back in Berlin on Thursday 18 October 2018 having completed an unsupported circumnavigation of the globe by bicycle in 124 Days, 10 hours and 50 minutes; Guinness World Records confirmed the attempt as recordbreaking in June 2019.

== See also ==
- Solo female cyclists
