= Around the world cycling record =

The fastest known time (FKT) for circumnavigation of the globe by bicycle is awarded for completing a continuous journey around the globe by bicycle and other means, consisting of a minimum 29,000 km (18,000 miles) in total distance cycled.

Current Fastest Known Times (FKTs) For Competitive Circumnavigations (150 days or Less)
Record	Name	Year	Length (dd:hh:mm)	Guinness World Record
Unsupported (F)	Lael Wilcox	2024	108:12:12	Yes
Supported (M)	Mark Beaumont	2017	78:14:40	Yes
Unsupported (F)	Jenny Graham	2018	124:10:50	Yes
Unsupported (M)	Andrew Nicholson	2015	123:01:06	Yes
Oldest and Disability (M)	Christopher R. Bennett	2025	129:18:20	Yes (Oldest)
Mixed and married couple (M/F)	Kyle & Amy Hudson	2026	123:23:24	Yes

By convention, most FKT attempts follow the Guinness World Record (GWR) Rules. One can still have the FKT but not the GWR. For example, Lee Fancourt set an FKT which was not ratified due to him not strictly following the GWR Rules.

The GWR Rules state that the journey should be continuous and in one direction (East to West or West to East), that the minimum distance ridden should be 18,000 miles (29,000 km), and that the total distance travelled by the bicycle and rider should exceed an Equator's length. The clock does not stop for any waiting time for transit flights or ferries or for the duration of the transit (see full rules below).

The GWR Rules do not distinguish between supported and unsupported attempts, even though the latter are much more difficult. The principles for unsupported rides are:

1. do it all yourself, under your own power;
2. carry all your own gear (i.e. no domestiques); and
3. no outside support (deliveries only to public addresses or 'open' homes, no support vehicles of any kind meeting the rider along the way).

'Pure' unsupported rides also preclude any visits from friends or others along the way. These rules require riders to be alone for the entire ride except for 'unplanned' rides with other cyclists (i.e. not pre-arranging company).

Competitive rides recognised as unsupported are Julian Sayarer (2009), Mike Hall (2012), Juliana Buhring (2012), Andrew Nicholson (2015), Lee Fancourt (2015), Jenny Graham (2018), Douglas Concha (2024), and Christopher R. Bennett (2025).

== Guinness World Record Rules ==
The GWR rules have evolved over time with those prevailing in 2024 different in key ways from earlier rules. For example, the maximum time of 175 days that prevailed at the time of Jenny Graham does not appear to still be used. A maximum time of 150 days is now accepted as the metric for differentiating riders who 'race' around the world from those who 'tour'. The current rules are:

- Start and finish points must be the same location.
- The journey should be continual and in one direction, i.e. East to West or West to East. Any considerable distance travelled opposite to the direction of the attempt (be it on foot or by other means of transport such as an aircraft) will be discounted from any calculations of the overall distance travelled.
- The journey must be continuous, with each leg of the journey beginning at the point at which the previous leg ended. This means that if riders take a break from the race and travel forward in a prohibited form of transport, they have to backtrack and cycle that distance starting from exactly the same place or risk disqualification.
- The minimum distance ridden should be 18,000 miles (28,970 km), and the total distance should exceed an equator’s length or ‘great circle’, i.e. more than 24,900 miles (40,075 km).
- No form of private transport may be used other than that by which the attempt is undertaken.
- Scheduled public and chartered transport may be used, but the challenger must be a passenger
- The scheduled public or chartered transport must be operated by a commercial, professional person or organisation.
- The participant must pass through two approximate antipodal points during the attempt.
- The participant should not remain stationary (i.e. if he or she does not make any progress towards her destination) for longer than 14 days.
- No distinction will be made between supported and unsupported journeys.

Except for the 'fastest' there is no recognition by Guinness for speed with other categories (e.g. oldest, youngest, etc.).

Earlier rules had a number of restrictions:

- "During the attempt, the challenger is not allowed the aid of drafting. If the challenger is travelling with a support vehicle or other rider(s), the challenger MUST remain a minimum distance of 5 bicycle lengths from the support vehicle or any other rider(s). The challenger must not travel next to the support vehicle or any other rider(s) throughout the attempt." Drafting has been removed from the rules.
- "When crossing oceans or any other impassable barriers, the participant may use scheduled public transport, such as buses, aircraft, ferries etc. However, private or chartered transport (including taxis) is not permitted." This has been relaxed with regard to chartered transport which is now permitted, as long as: "chartered transport must be operated by a commercial, professional person or organisation"

Alan Bate writes of the early rules, which are still largely reflected in the current rules:

The record criteria requires the rider to cover 28,970 kilometers by bike, in an East to West or West to East direction, wavering no more than 5 degrees off course. The total journey distance must be a minimum of 40,075 kilometers, to include all transit by flight or sea. The ride must start and finish in the same place and must pass at least two antipodal points (these are two points that line up through the earth's centre). When the rider reaches a transit point to connect with a flight or boat to the next continent or country start point, the clock stops with regard to the actual riding time *(no longer the case any more since the rules have changed in relation to transit time, which is NOW included in the total time). As most of the earth's surface is water, this is unavoidable and fair as it applies to all athletes attempting the record. Once customs is cleared at the next destination, the clock immediately starts again. The same bicycle must be used throughout the attempt, although repairs and replacement parts and bikes are allowed for mechanical failure. Satellite tracking is highly recommended by Guinness World Records and a daily log, signatures of dignitaries and photographs at strategic points must be collated as evidence.

The current GWR Rules no longer include the 5 degree off course limitation, however, that convention is still followed by riders. Jenny Graham in 2018 ended her China leg before Beijing so that she would not have to backtrack at all when travelling to Perth. In 2024 when travelling Alaska to Los Angeles, Lael Wilcox kept within the 5 degree principle with a -2.98 degree westward swing from her easternmost point (100 Mile House, B.C. at -121.28) and westernmost point (Ferndale CA at -124.26).

== Routes ==
The requirement to pass at least two antipodal points causes some problems in route planning. For example, among popular countries for around-the-world cyclists, the antipodes of Australia is spread out over the Atlantic Ocean, that of North America over the Indian Ocean, that of Africa over mid Pacific Ocean, and that of Europe and most of Asia over the South Pacific Ocean, without any land mass there. Those land areas would not give any opportunities for an antipodal pair while cycling. Some possible pairs are China/Argentina, Malaysia/Peru, and Spain/New Zealand (for example, the road Lisbon–Madrid crosses the antipode of the road Wellington–Auckland).

The length requirement also requires consideration. To cycle Lisbon–Vladivostok (13900 km), Perth–Brisbane (4300 km) and Los Angeles–St. John's (7200 km) with air travel between legs gives 25,400 km. So some detours are needed (such as Invercargill–Auckland, New Zealand, 1800 km, for the sake of the antipodes requirement).

Mark Beaumont, in a 2024 interview with GCN, provides insight into the challenges and implications of route selection. He comments "If you think about riding around the world in its simplest sense, you want to be able to look at a wall map and it looks like a circumnavigation. [my rides were] faithful to that idea of what looks like an unbroken route around the world." Noting that Asia is the most challenging to ride due to road conditions and complexities of border crossings, those who avoid Asia end up with large north-south loops in North America and Europe to make up the distance which inevitably give them faster times.

== Standard Bicycle ==
=== Nick Sanders (1984) ===
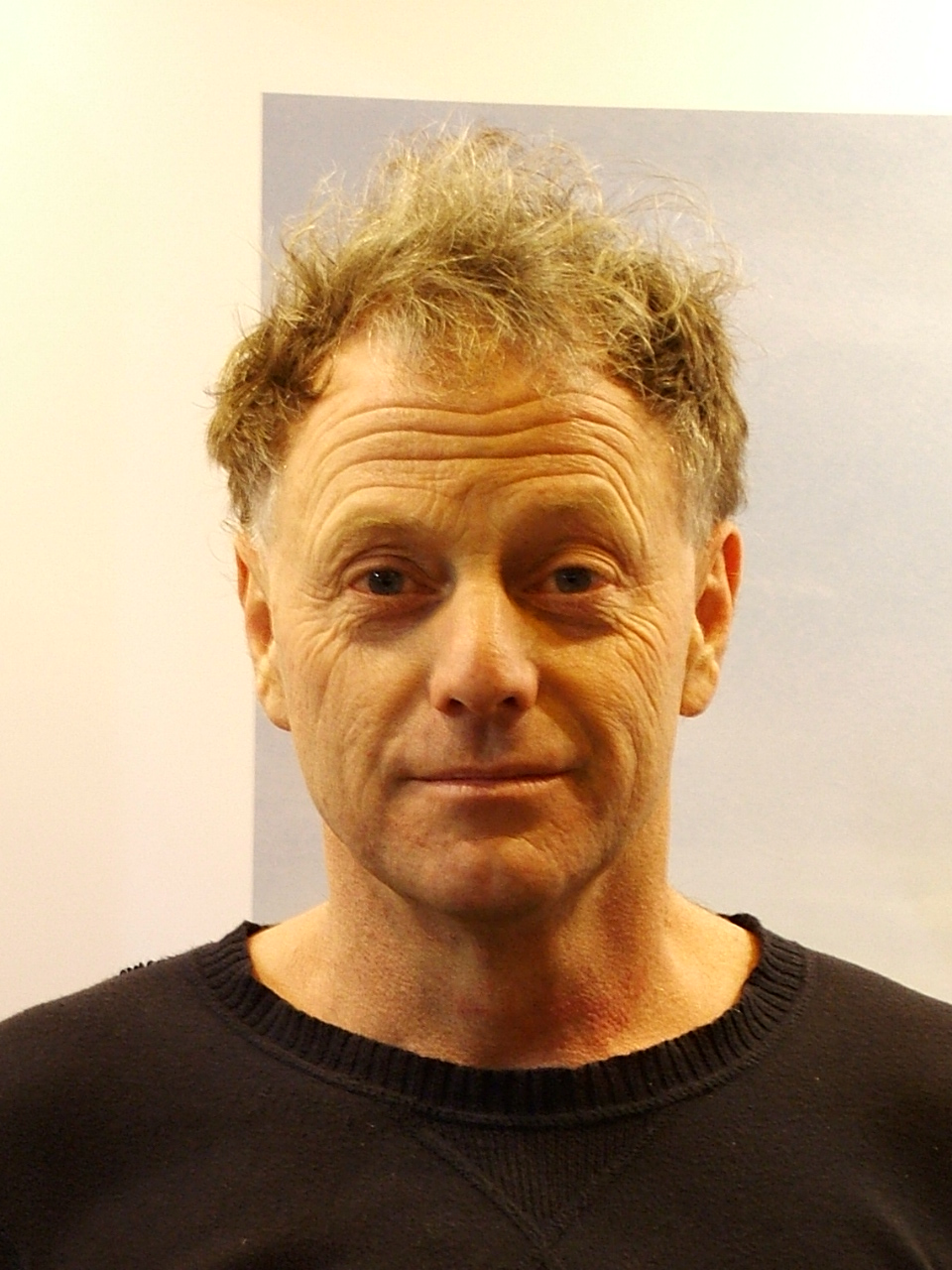
Nick Sanders

Nick Sanders completed a notable ride in 1984, riding 13,609 miles (21,900 km) around the Northern Hemisphere in 138 days, although this ride did not meet the requirements to be recognised as a GWR record. (Note: Strange's website, Wayback Machine (for example here for 10 September 2008).)

=== Phil White (2005) ===
In April 2005, Phil White completed a record attempt in an estimated 299 days. This was not certified by Guinness World Records.

=== Mark Beaumont (2008) ===
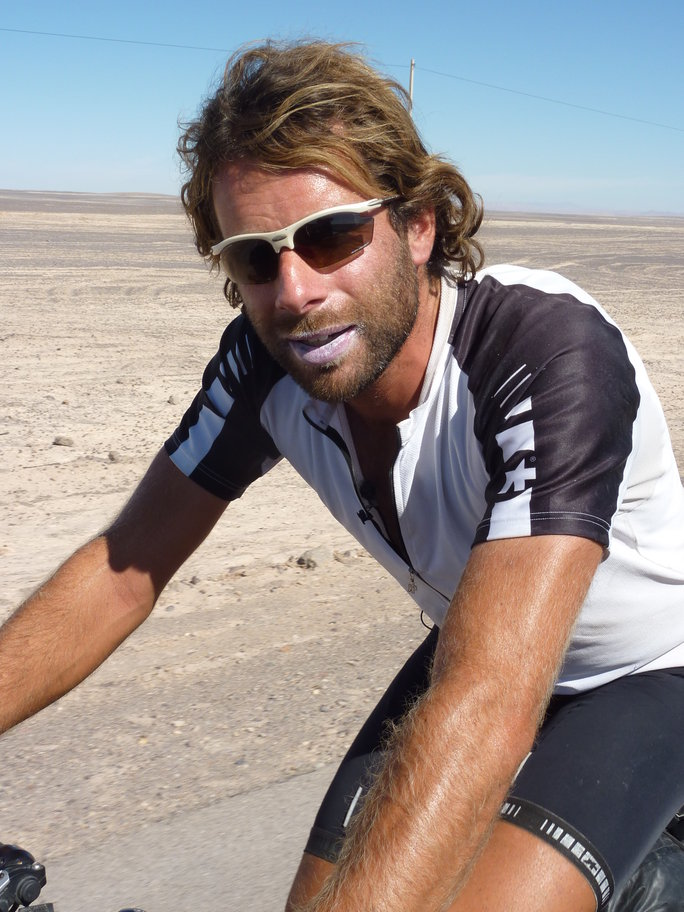
Mark Beaumont

On 14 February 2008, Mark Beaumont completed a circumnavigation of the globe by bicycle in 194 days and 17 hours.

=== James Bowthorpe (2009) ===
In September 2009 James Bowthorpe completed an eastward circumnavigation, starting and ending in London, in 176 days. (Note: Bowthorpe's bicycle is described in "James Bowthorpe's round-the-world bike", Cycling Weekly, 24 February 2010. Bowthorpe's blog (as of 2022, last updated in 2010) is globecycle.org.) This was not ratified by Guinness World Records.

=== Julian Sayarer (2009) ===
In December 2009 Julian Sayarer, a London-based cycle courier, completed a circumnavigation, starting at Rouen and going through Europe, Russia, Kazakhstan and China as far as Shanghai; Bangkok to Singapore; the length of New Zealand; Vancouver to the east coast of the US; and finally from Lisbon back to Rouen. The time was first described as 165 days, and ratified by Guinness at 169 days. Sayarer's blog about the ride is at This Is Not for Charity.

=== Vin Cox (2010) ===
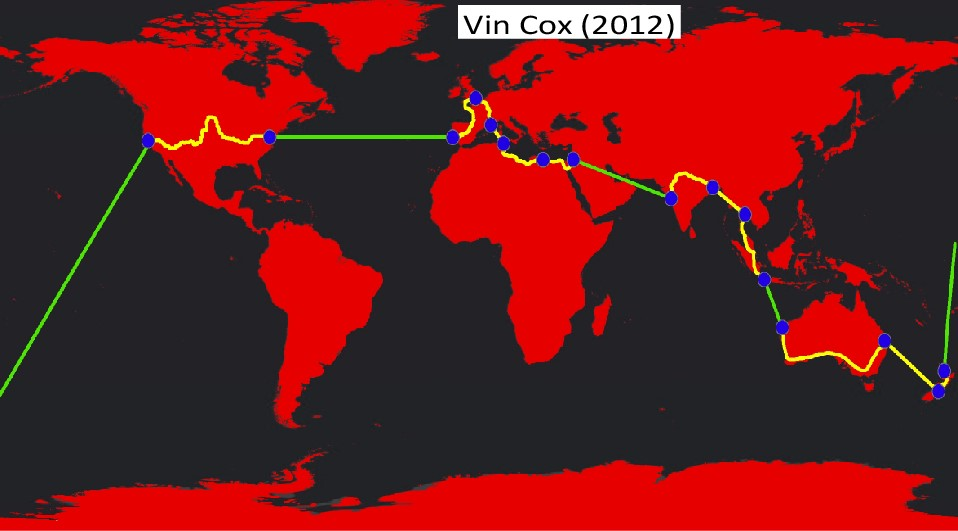
Route followed by Vin Cox when circumnavigating the world

On 1 August 2010, Vin Cox completed an unsupported circumnavigation of the globe, which was certified by Guinness as the new world record with a time of 163 days, 6 hours, 58 minutes.

=== Alan Bate (2010) ===
On 4 August 2010, Alan Bate completed a supported circumnavigation in 106 days 10 hours and 33 minutes, which was ratified by Guinness World Records in January 2012. (Note: Bate's website, worldcyclingrecord.com, no longer exists, but is partially available via the Wayback Machine (for example here for 19 March 2015).)

=== Mike Hall (2012) ===
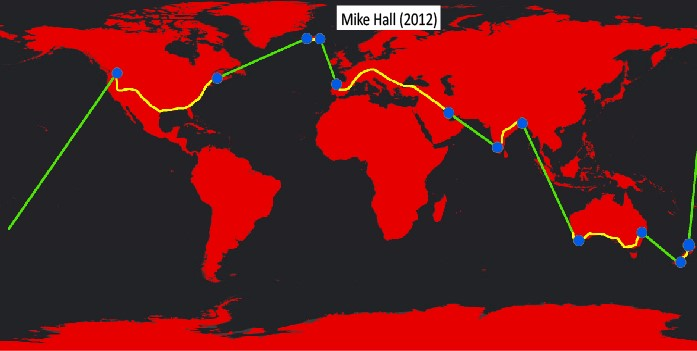
Route followed by Mike Hall when circumnavigating the world

On 4 June 2012, Mike Hall completed his circumnavigation (from Greenwich, eastwards to Greenwich) in 91 days 18 hours. His ride was totally unsupported. After the ride, Guinness World Records changed the rules to include total travel time. Under the new rules Hall recorded a time of 107 days 2 hours 30 minutes, which was not ratified by Guinness World Records.

=== Juliana Buhring (2012) ===
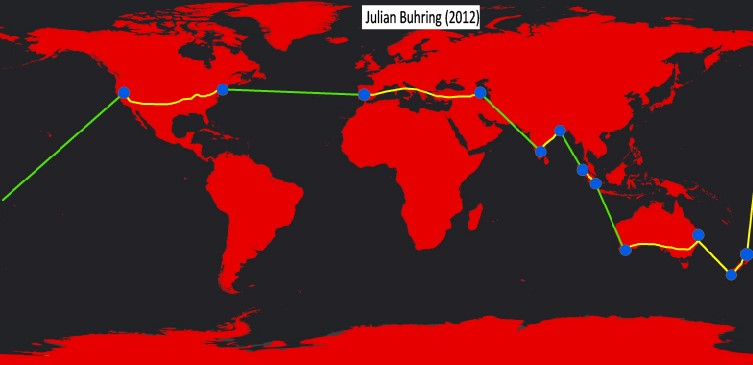
Route followed by Juliana Buhring when circumnavigating the world

On 21 December 2012, Juliana Buhring, of British–German nationality, arrived back in Naples to complete a circumnavigation in 152 days including total travel time, becoming the first woman to attempt and to complete a circumnavigation of the world by bicycle using a route that complies with the requirements of Guinness World Records. This was an unsupported ride.

=== Thomas Großerichter (2012) ===
On 31 December 2012, Thomas Großerichter, from Germany, completed a supported circumnavigation in 105 days 1 hour and 44 minutes. This was not certified by Guinness World Records.

=== Lee Fancourt (2014) ===
On 13 June 2014, Lee Fancourt completed a circumnavigation in 103 days, 23 hours, 15 minutes. This was not ratified by Guinness World Records. Fancourt's record attempt was disqualified after failing to return to the point in India where he took a taxi in order to help out his support crew.

=== Paola Gianotti (2014) ===
Paola Gianotti started and finished at Ivrea, Turin, Italy, from 8 March to 30 November 2014: 144 days. This was a supported ride. During her voyage, on 16 May 2014, Gianotti was injured in a road accident which resulted in a fractured vertebra. Although the Guinness World Record rules state that the clock does not stop, Gianotti's time was frozen for four months till she recovered and resumed her attempt on 18 September 2014. (Note: Gianotti's route is here.) This was ratified at the time by Guinness as being the world record, but much debated at the time.

=== Andrew Nicholson (2015) ===
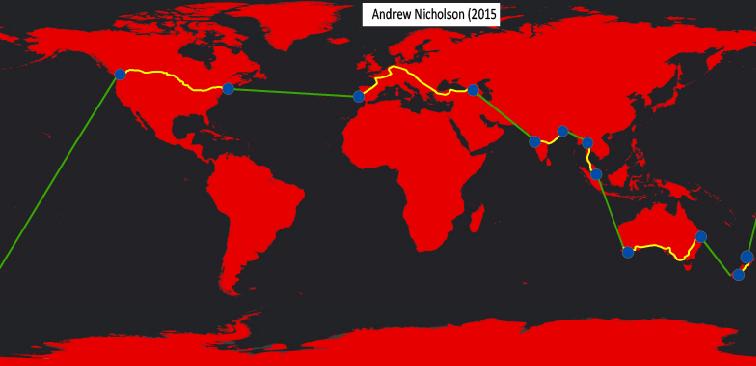
Route followed by Andrew Nicholson when circumnavigating the world

Former speedskater Andrew Nicholson (New Zealand) completed an unsupported circumnavigation 29,179 km in 123 days, 1 hour and 6 minutes. The ride, which was unsupported, was recognized by Guinness. Nicholson started and ended his journey at Auckland International Airport, New Zealand, between 12 August and 13 December 2015.

=== Mark Beaumont (2017) ===
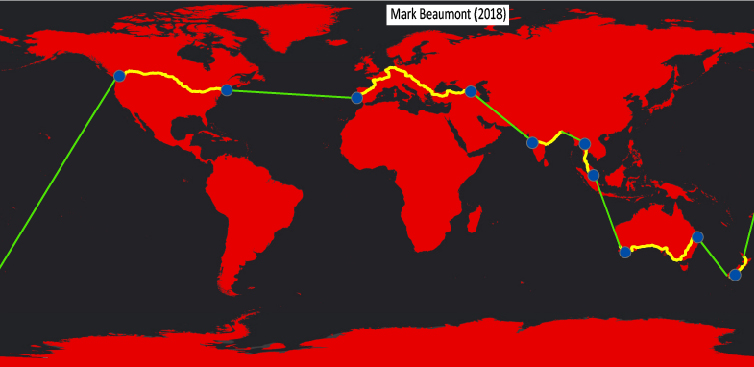
Route followed by Mark Beaumont when circumnavigating the world

On 18 September 2017, Mark Beaumont arrived in Paris having completed a supported circumnavigation of the globe by bicycle in 78 days 14 hours, and 40 minutes. This beat his previous unsupported attempt by 115 days and beat the previous world record by 44 days and 10 hours and should be regarded as the record. This attempt was verified by Guinness World Records as he finished in Paris. The BBC reported, "During the trip, Mark was also awarded the Guinness World Records title for the most miles cycled in a month, from Paris to Perth, Australia, verified at 7,031 miles (11,315km)". Beaumont had significant support on his ride from a "base camp" team who stayed in Scotland, and "on the road" teams who followed in camper vans which provided him a comfortable place to rest when off the bike. The support team covered duties ranging from preparing his meals and ensuring optimum nutrition, optimising his route to avoid ratification pitfalls, providing massages to help alleviate the discomfort of spending long hours in the same position, and psychological support during low points.

=== Vedangi Kulkarni (2018) ===
Between July and December 2018, Vedangi Kulkarni, a native of Pune studying at Bournemouth University, attempted to become the fastest woman to circumnavigate the world on bicycle. Although she did not succeed in this, she was the "fastest Asian" to do so - although her ride was never ratified by Guinness due to a lack of evidence. Her journey started at Perth, crossing to Brisbane, crossing New Zealand, from Vancouver to Halifax, across Iceland, from Portugal to Finland, across Russia, 4,000 km across India to Kolkata; and from there flying to Perth for a 15 km ride to the starting point. The ride took 159 days as far as Kolkata and its distance exceeded 29,000 km. Kulkarni was 19 when she started and 20 when she finished the ride. She became "the fourth fastest woman to cycle round the world, as well as the youngest".

=== Jenny Graham (2018) ===
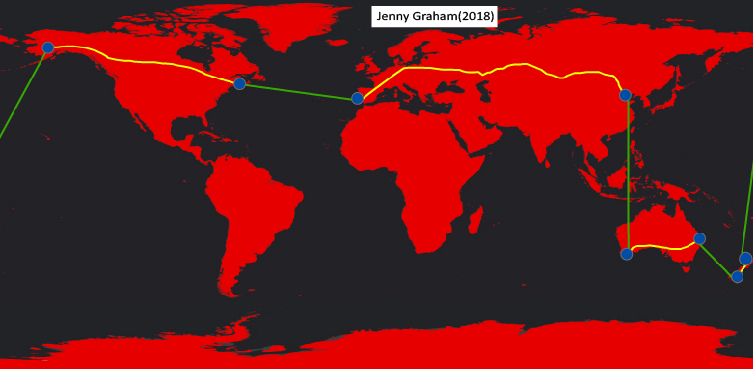
Route followed by Jenny Graham when circumnavigating the world

On 18 October 2018 Jenny Graham of Scotland arrived in Berlin having completed an unsupported circumnavigation of the globe by bicycle in 124 Days, 10 hours and 50 minutes. This was recognised by Guinness World Records as the new woman's record. She cycled the route solo and totally unsupported, often sleeping rough in drainage ditches or behind bushes.

=== Lael Wilcox (2024) ===
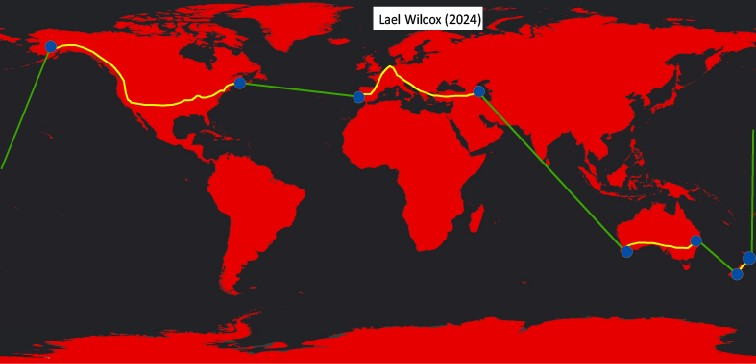
Route followed by Lael Wilcox when circumnavigating the world

On May 26, 2024 Lael Wilcox left Chicago, Illinois and on 11 September 2024, Wilcox successfully finished the circumnavigation in 108 days, 12 hours, and 12 minutes, beating the previously held women's (self supported) world record of 124 days, 10 hours, and 15 minutes. Wilcox encouraged her followers to ride with her.

=== Christopher R. Bennett (2025) ===
On 8 September 2025 Christopher R. Bennett from Golden Bay New Zealand completed 29,051 km following the Guinness Rules, riding unsupported for 129 days, 18 hours, and 20 minutes. At 66 he was the oldest to complete the ride competitively, with the tenth fastest time and fourth fastest self-supported time. He was the first person to complete the challenge with a disability (traumatic brain injury). His circumnavigation started 1 May in Helsinki, with the riding starting in Nukus Uzbekistan. His record as the oldest was recognised by Guinness but not his disability since brain injuries are not in the list of disabilities acknowledged by Guinness. His time of 129:18:20 stands as a fastest known time (FKT) for a Grand Veteran/Grand Master (over 60), but Guinness does not include times for any records except the fastest male and female.

=== Alana Conner (2025) ===
On 14 April 2024 Alana Conner left San Francisco, California, completing her circumnavigation on 22 June 2025. Her route followed the Guinness World Record Rules for circumnavigating the globe by bike. She is the first woman to hold the title of oldest female to circumnavigate the globe.

== Mixed Bicycle ==
=== Jay Aldous & Matt DeWaal (1984) ===
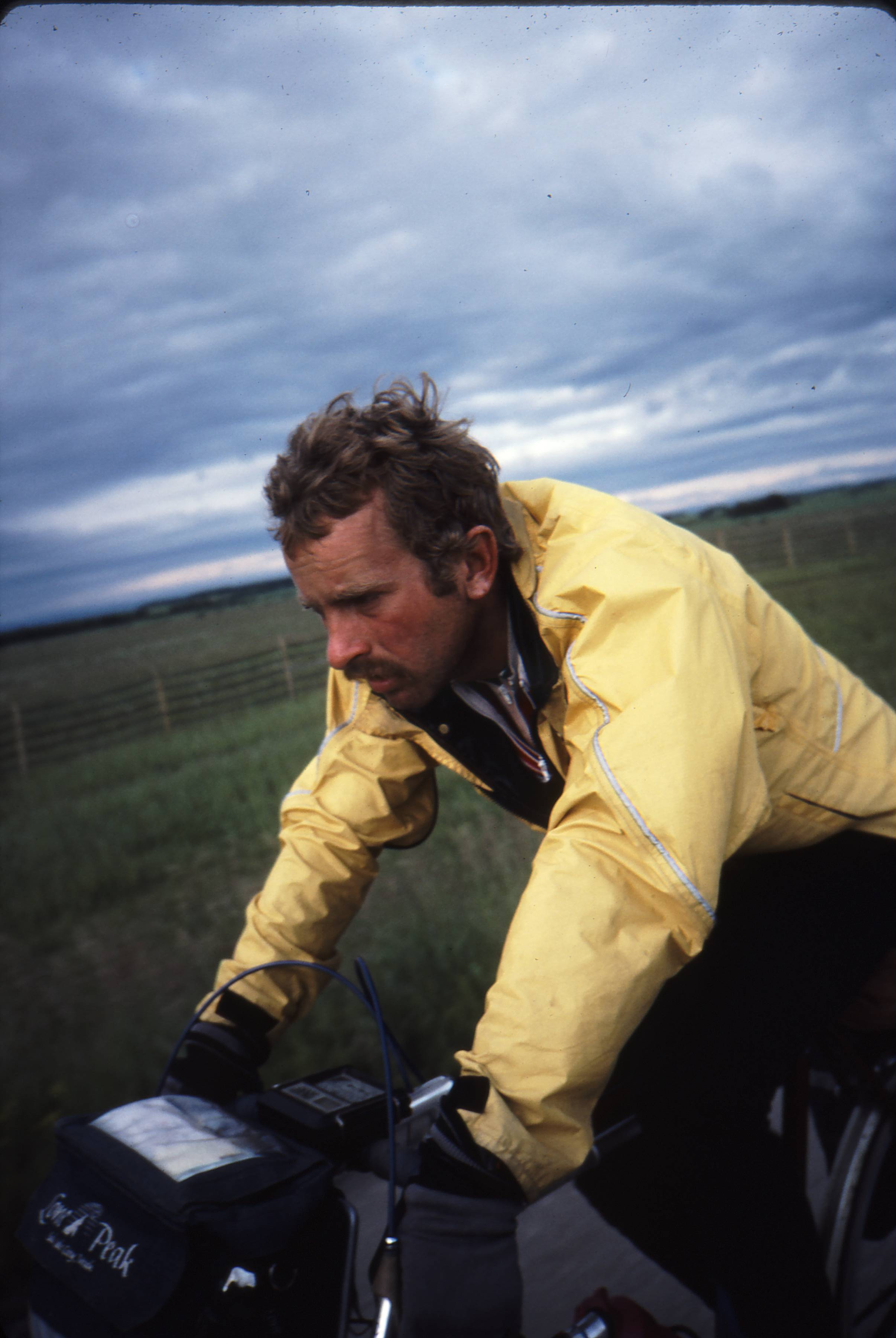
Matt DeWaal

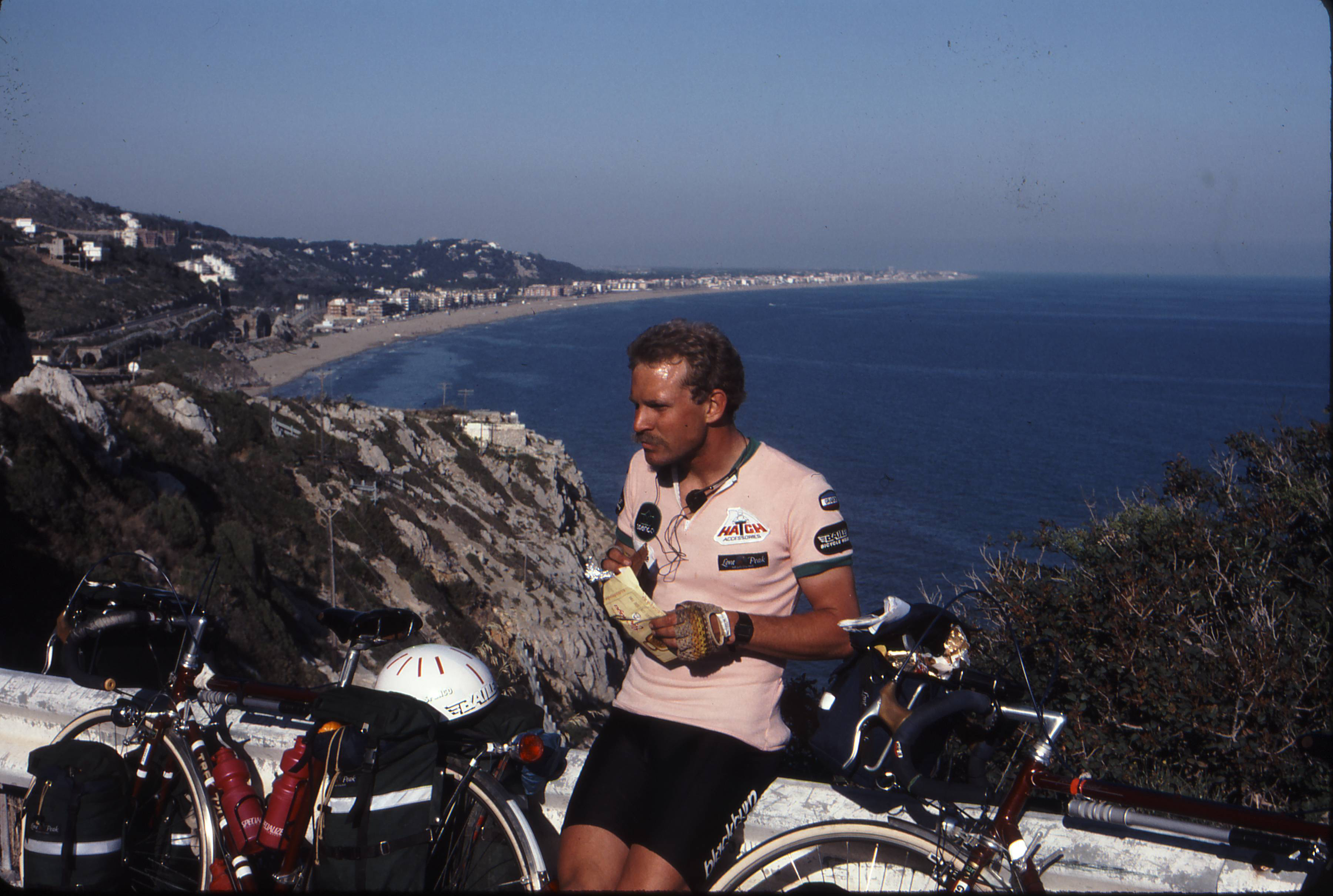
Jay Aldous

From 2 April to 16 July 1984 Jay Aldous and Matt DeWaal rode 22,997 km/14,290 miles in 106 days, riding a greater distance in a shorter time than Nick Sanders in 1981. Aldous and DeWaal started and ended in Salt Lake City, US, and traveled in an easterly direction passing through 15 different countries. This was not certified by Guinness World Records. (Note: Strange's website, Wayback Machine (for example here for 10 September 2008).)

=== Caroline Soubayroux & David Ferguson (2021-2022) ===
In September 2021, Caroline Soubayroux and David Ferguson, a married couple based in London, left from The Royal London Hospital in Whitechapel to try and set a new Guinness world record circumnavigation for a married couple on two bikes. As creators of this new world record category, both of them took a six-month sabbatical leave from their full-time career in Investment Banking and Orthopaedic Surgery to allow for the trip. The impact of the COVID-19 pandemic meant they suffered travel complexities and rode a majority of their circumnavigation in the Southern Hemisphere, crossing South America and Africa. Their attempt was fully unsupported with the exception of the Australian leg where a camping van driven by Ferguson's father provided camp for the night. New Zealand being closed at the time of their travel, their antipodal point was Honolulu in Hawaii, the archipelago being the antipode of Ghanzi in Botswana - clearing the antipodal requirement by a kilometer. Soubayroux and Ferguson successfully completed their first circumnavigation on 16 April 2022 in 204 days, 17 hours and 25 minutes, and returned to full time employment the next day. The record was checked and validated by Guinness on 28 April 2023.

=== Amy Hudson & Kyle Hudson (2026) ===
On 1 May 2026, Amy and Kyle Hudson, set out to break two world records, for the fastest circumnavigation around the world on standard bicycles for a mixed couple and a married couple. They started their unsupported journey close to Derby in the United Kingdom. In their first leg they cycled to Istanbul. From there they took a flight to Bangkok, from which they rode to singapore. After that they crossed Australia from west to east and New Zealand from south to north. In Wellington they reached their first Antipodal point. Then they went from Anchorage via the state of Arkensas to Halifax. In the province of Quebec, Kyle fell of his bike due to an incident with a car. Because of the crash he hurt his collarbone, after the journey they found out it was broken, nevertheless the pair rode on. From Halifax they flew to Lisbon for their final part of the journey. In Alaejos, Spain they reached their second Antipodal point, before returning back to Derby. There they arrived back on 2 september 2026, setting their record time on 123 days, 23 hours and 24 minutes. With their ride they raised over £75,000 for charity.

== Tandem Bicycle ==
=== John Whybrow and George Agate (2017) ===
On 25 March 2017, John Whybrow and George Agate (known as 'The Tandem Men'), set the first tandem bicycle circumnavigation record. Starting and finishing in Canterbury, UK, the pair completed their attempt in 290 days, 7 hours and 36 minutes aboard an Orbit Tandem. This was an unsupported ride.

=== Lloyd Collier and Louis Snellgrove (2019) ===
On 16 May 2019, Lloyd Collier and Louis Snellgrove cycled 29,140 km and crossed the finishing line at the Adelaide Oval, Australia in 281 days to achieve the Guinness World Record. They rode through 24 countries and 5 continents. Both emergency doctors, they raised money for Spinal Research and The Brain foundation. Their ride was westwards and unsupported.

=== Cat Dixon and Raz Marsden (2019) ===
On the 29th June 2019, Cat Dixon and Raz Marsden (both UK) set out on their tandem bike to embark on what would become a record-breaking adventure around the world; completing their journey in 263 days, 8 hours and 7 minutes. Cat, 54, and Raz, 55, set out from Oxford last year, covering 18,263 miles on a route that took them through 25 different countries and five continents. The record-breaking route: Starting in Oxford, UK, then onto France, Monaco, Italy, Slovenia, Croatia, Bosnia and Herzegovina, Montenegro, Albania, Macedonia, Greece, Turkey, Georgia, India, Myanmar, Thailand, Malaysia, Singapore, Australia, New Zealand, United States, Mexico, Morocco, Spain, Gibraltar and then finally back through France to the UK, where they completed their journey. "We have highlights from every country that we visited and would definitely return to see many- although maybe at a slower pace," the pair said.

=== SteLa Tandem: Steven Massey and Laura Massey-Pugh (2022) ===
On 5 June 2022, Laura Massey-Pugh and husband Steven (Stevie) Massey (both Derby, UK) started from the Brandenburg Gate in Berlin, their aim to set a new mixed circumnavigation record on tandem bicycle and hold the fastest tandem record by completing the trip in 180 days. They returned on 1 December 2022 with a time of 179 days 12 hours and 25 minutes, which has been registered by Guinness as a new record. Their trip took them through Czechia, Austria, Slovakia, Hungary, Romania, Bulgaria, Turkey and Georgia before closed land borders to Azerbaijan forced them to travel directly to India. They then travelled to Thailand, Malaysia and Singapore, before crossing the South of Australia, both Islands of New Zealand and the breath of Canada before returning to Europe via Portugal, Spain, France, Belgium, Holland and back to Germany. They suffered monsoons and sickness in India, a motorcycle collision in Malaysia and sub −10 °C temperatures in Canada but remained resolved to make their 180 day target despite major mechanical issues within the final 24 hours. They say their trip was certainly not a holiday and they would never do it again but are very proud of their achievement as a couple and a team.

== Single-speed Bicycle ==
=== Douglas Concha (2024) ===
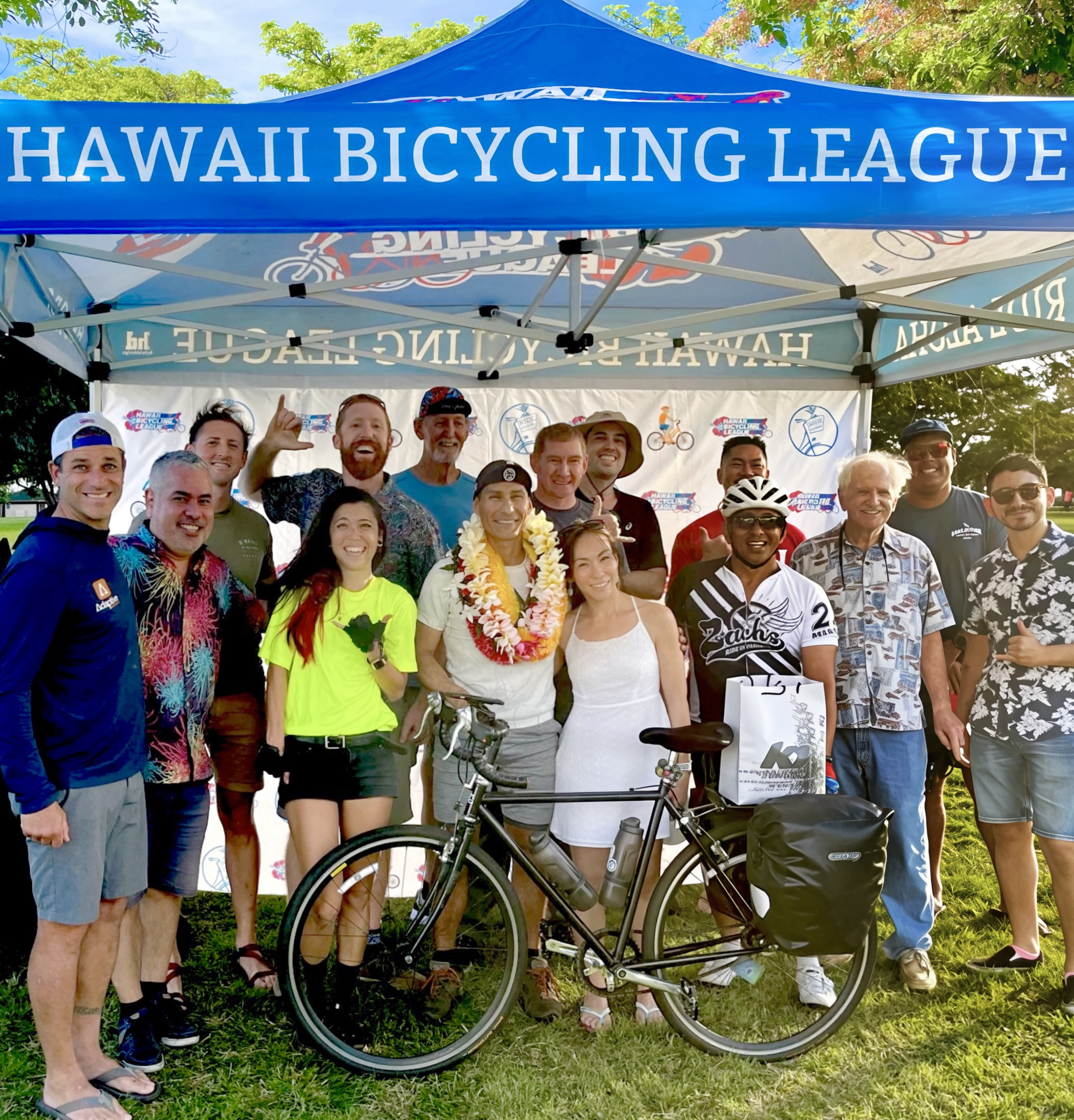
Douglas Concha Completes World Record Single-Speed Circumnavigation, Hawaii, March 1, 2024

Douglas Concha completed the fastest known time for circumnavigation of the globe, unassisted, on a single-speed bicycle based on the Guinness World Records (GWR) Beginning on June 1, 2023, Douglas Concha rode across Australia, SE Asia, Central Asia, Africa, Europe, South America and North America. He averaged 101 miles/162 km per day cycling and completed a total of 18,007 miles/28,879 km on May 1, 2024 Based on the GWR standards; Douglas Concha started and finished in the same location (Honolulu, HI, USA); crossed the antipodal point with the start-finish (Dekar, Botswana); rode in a westerly direction without recrossing a longitude line; did not stop for more than 3 days; and only used flights to cross large bodies of water He completed his ride in 274 days, unsupported, on a single-speed bicycle. Guinness World Records is currently certifying Dougla Concha’s single-speed circumnavigation of the globe.

Find out more about his route at: Island Scene

== Recumbent Bicycle ==
=== Richard Evans (2014) ===
Richard Evans rode around the world on a recumbent bicycle in 180 days April–October 2014. This was not a GWR record as Guiness declined to recognise recumbent bicycles for the challenge.

== Unicycle ==
=== Wally Watts (1976) ===
Between 1976 and 1978, Walter J. Watts, known as "Wobbling" Wally Watts unicycled 12,000 miles around the world. Travelling eastward, he started and ended in New York. Some countries he unicycled in: UK, France, Italy, Greece, Turkey, India, Australia, New Zealand, United States.

=== Ed Pratt (2018) ===
From March 2015 to July 27, 2018, Ed Pratt unicycled 21,000 miles (33,000 km) for 3 years, 135 days, starting and ending in Somerset, England. He had a specially made pannier that helped him to complete the trip unsupported. The trip was discontinuous in time: he suspended his trip during the winter time due to icy, slippery conditions. This discontinuity lasted longer than 14 days, and was one of the reasons Pratt did not receive the Guinness World Record for Unicycling around the world. When he was no longer able satisfy the conditions for the Guinness record, he made his own rule that on land he would ride his unicycle, or walk, and push it, so that "apart from the watery bits [he would make] an unbroken unicycle tire track around the entire planet". He was awarded the Prime Minister's Points of Light award for using the trip to fundraise for the charity School in a Bag, which delivers school equipment to children in need around the world.

== See also ==
- Record for distance in a calendar year
