= Sana Iqbal =

Indian cross-country biker

Sana Iqbal (16 January 1987 – 24 October 2017) was an Indian solo female cross-country biker. She was on a solo mission to create awareness on suicide and depression. She did counseling on her Facebook page and helped students lead happy and meaningful lives by guiding them towards practicality and positivity.

== Early life ==
She was born in Hyderabad. Sana loved riding bikes since seventh grade. Born in a liberal Muslim family, she was raised with values which emphasised on humanity and purity of heart. An avid biker, a dedicated training professional and a student of Psychology made her eligible to execute the 'rarely thought about aspect of society'.

== Response to depression ==
She attempted suicide through a bike accident. At age 27, she biked to Gujarat with a death wish to be rammed by a bus or truck. The journey made her realize that peace can be attained by peace. Later she decided to use a journey to give purpose to her suffering.

Her fight against her depression led her to become a hero for many youth. She gave workshops on awareness that "Suicide is not the solution". In her workshop she talked on matters that trouble young minds: matters as innocuous as acne to relationships, career, marriage, depression and suicide. She also used to manage a facebook page named Suicide is not the solution with the help of her close friend and the current owner of the face book page, Arif Ali Mohammed. The Facebook page currently has 12000+ followers and Arif is trying to continue to spread the message Sana left him with.

== Cross-country ride ==
Sana planned a cross-country solo trip to every state in India, starting from Goa in November, 2015. She completed her mission on 13 June 2016, 2 days before her son's first birthday, after covering 2 countries, 111 cities, 29 states and 5 union territories traveling over 38,000 km which took her 6.5 months, while offering 135 seminars. A grand welcome reception was arranged for her by her local Wanderers club. Two other clubs from Nagpur (UNIDO) and Kolkata (Eastern Bulls) rode with her from Nagpur to Hyderabad. Her journey was actively supported by various groups and clubs, predominantly the biking community of India.

== Personal life ==
She was a mother and was pursuing her master's in psychology along with corporate training sessions on behavioral skills.

== Death ==
On 24 October 2017 at 4 am she was travelling in a car with her husband Nadeem. The duo met with an accident which resulted in her death. Her husband, Nadeem survived the accident. The accident took place at Narsinghi Gandipet road in Telangana. After the accident, a controversy arose when her mother raised complaints regarding the possibility of murder.

Her husband was booked under section IPC 304A (causing death by negligence) and was let off on bail.
