= Mark Beaumont (cyclist) =

British cyclist born in Blairgowrie, adventurer and documentary filmmaker

Mark Beaumont BEM
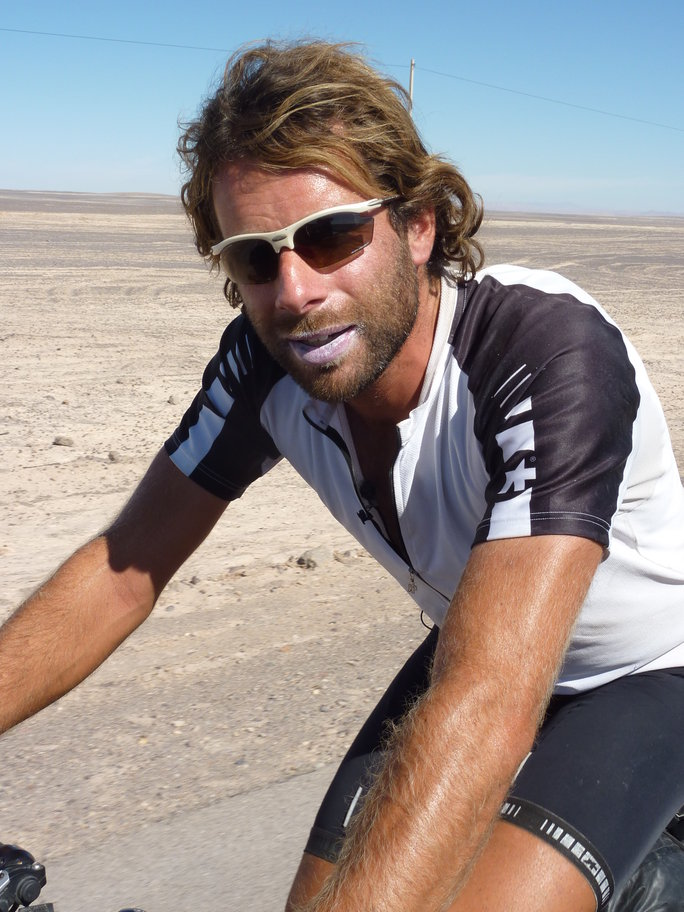
- Born: 1 January 1983 (age 43); Blairgowrie, Scotand
- Occupations: Cyclist, adventurer, broadcaster, documentary maker, author
- Known for: Record for cycling round the world
- Website: markbeaumontonline.com

Mark Ian Macleod Beaumont BEM (born 1 January 1983) is a British long-distance cyclist, broadcaster and author. He holds the record for cycling round the world, completing his 18,000-mile (29,000 km) route on 18 September 2017, having taken 78 days and 14 hours. On 18 February 2010 Beaumont completed a quest to cycle the Americas, cycling from Anchorage, Alaska, US to Ushuaia in Southern Argentina, for a BBC Television series.

In the summer of 2011 Beaumont joined a six-man team to row from Resolute Bay in the Nunavut Territory, Canada to the 1996 location of the North Magnetic Pole. Each of these expeditions was filmed for BBC One documentaries. On 1 February 2012 Beaumont and his team of rowers were rescued from the Atlantic Ocean when their rowing boat capsized during a crossing from Morocco to Barbados. On 21 May 2015 he rode from Cairo to Cape Town (10,000 km) and broke the world record for fastest solo ride for the length of Africa by finishing in 42 days and 8 hours.

== Personal life ==
Beaumont was born in Blairgowrie, Perthshire and raised in Scotland, where he was home-schooled until the age of 11 by his mother, Una. He was then educated at the High School of Dundee. At age 15, he completed a solo ride the length of Great Britain from John o'Groats to Land's End.

He has a degree in politics from the University of Glasgow. He was awarded Graduate of the Year 2009 from that university, and won the 2010 Glenfiddich Spirit of Scotland Award. In 2012 he was awarded the degree of Doctor of Laws honoris causa from the University of Dundee. Beaumont was made Rector of the University of Dundee in January 2016.

In the 2018 New Year Honours, Beaumont was awarded the British Empire Medal (BEM) for services to sport, broadcasting and charity.

== Guinness world record ==
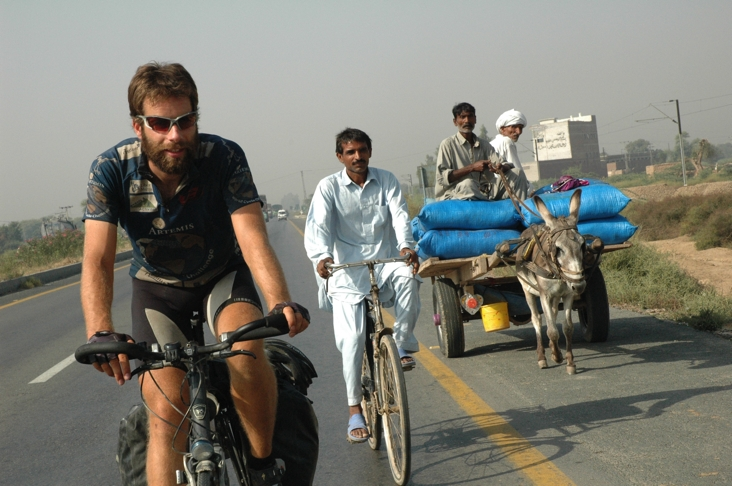
Mark Beaumont riding his bike.

In 2008, Beaumont broke the world record for a circumnavigational bike tour of the World. To qualify for the Guinness world record, he was required to travel an 18,000-mile route that passes through two approximately antipodal points. The route began and ended in Paris, France, riding through 20 countries across Europe, the Middle East, India, Asia, Australasia and North America. The bicycle used for the attempt was a Koga-Miyata with a Rohloff internal gearing hub. The bike was loaded with 66 pounds (30 kg) of equipment such as tools, cameras and other equipment to support him during the journey. The new record was set at 194 days and 17 hours, beating the previous record of 276 days and 19 hours.

Beaumont endured many hardships during his voyage. In Lafayette, Louisiana he was involved in a collision with a car and robbed later the same day, and elsewhere struggled with illnesses such as dysentery. As a result of breaking the world record, Beaumont raised £18,000 for charity.

Beaumont's video diaries of the journey formed the basis of a BAFTA-nominated documentary, The Man who Cycled the World, which was broadcast by the BBC in August 2008.

Beaumont's around-the-world cycling record was broken by Vin Cox on 1 August 2010. Beaumont regained the Guinness around-the-world cycling record in 2017 (see §Around the World in 80 Days below).

== BBC – Cycling the Americas ==
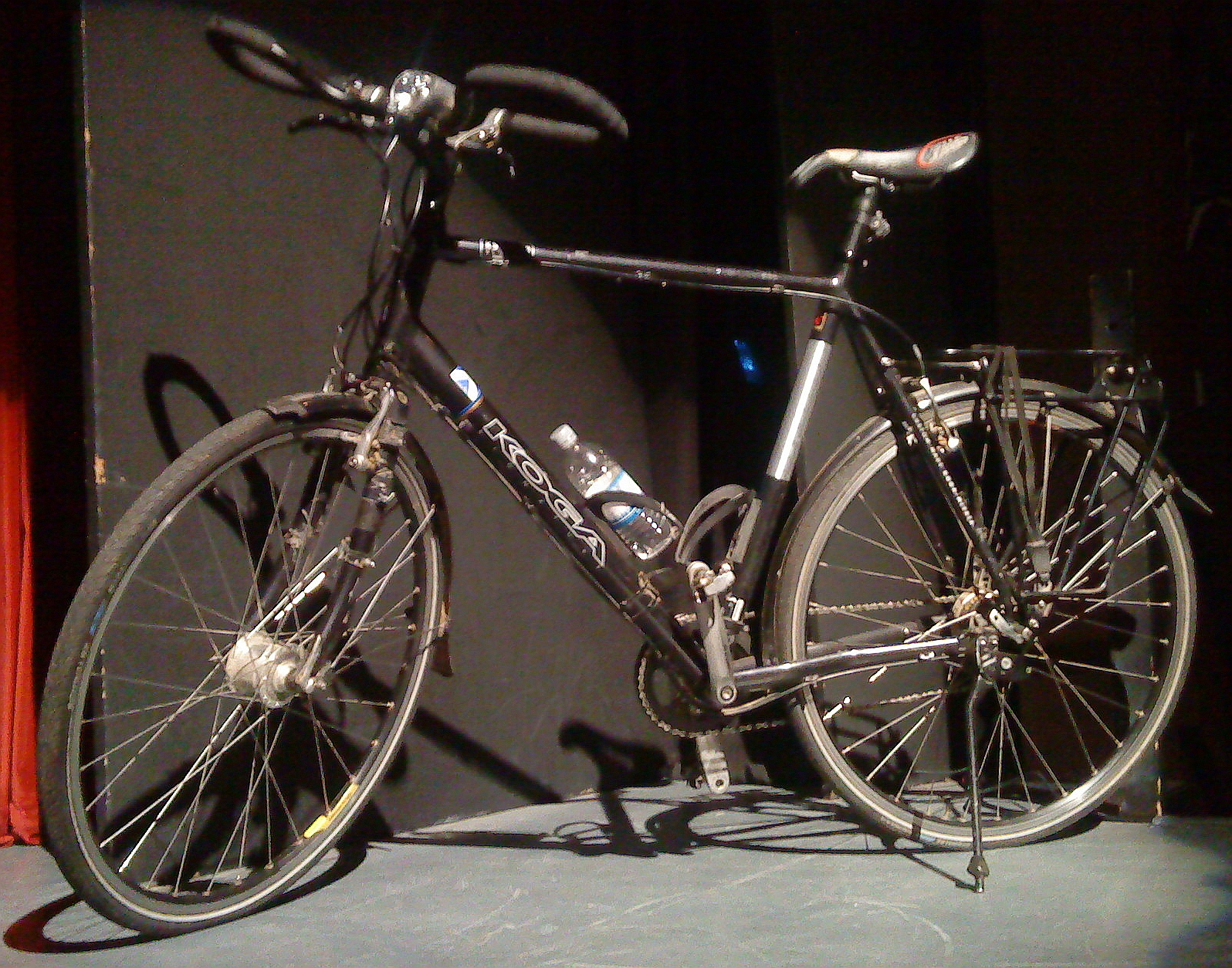
KOGA Bike ridden by Beaumont during Americas cycle

Beaumont cycled from Anchorage, Alaska, US to Ushuaia in Southern Argentina, arriving on 18 February 2010. In addition to cycling 13,080 miles (21,050 km) in 268 days, he climbed the highest peaks in North and South America: Denali and Aconcagua. Along with commenting online throughout the journey, he recorded the adventure for a BBC One documentary series, The Man Who Cycled The Americas. The first in the series of three episodes was broadcast on 23 March 2010 on BBC One. Beaumont bypassed Colombia and the Darién Gap on his journey.

== Around the World in 80 Days ==
During Summer 2017, Beaumont completed a second global circumnavigation, similar to his first 10 years prior, known as the Around the World in 80 Days Artemis Challenge.

The intention was to complete the trip in 80 days, inspired by the Jules Verne 1872 novel Around the World in Eighty Days. A support team traveled with him on his journey, providing nutritional, mechanical and logistical support. His target was to cover approximately 240 miles (390 km) a day. He completed the journey one day ahead of schedule on 18 September, with a total time of 78 days, 14 hours, 40 minutes, beating the previous around-the-world cycling record by 44 days.

As with Beaumont's original (2008) route, the trip started and finished in Paris, France, crossing Russia and Mongolia to Beijing, China (a more northerly route than in 2008), before echoing his original route across Australia and New Zealand. The route across North America was also a longer, more northerly route, before a final leg from Lisbon, Portugal back to Paris.

== Ocean rowing ==
During the summer of 2011, Beaumont joined a team of six in rowing through the Canadian Arctic, as the BBC cameraman as well as on the oars. Their aim was to reach a 1996 location of the North Magnetic Pole. It is only in the last few years that the sea ice has melted enough for such a route to be attempted.

In early 2012, Beaumont joined another team in an attempt to break the world record for rowing across the Atlantic Ocean. After 27 days and over 2,000 miles into the expedition, they capsized and had to be rescued.

== Other endeavours ==
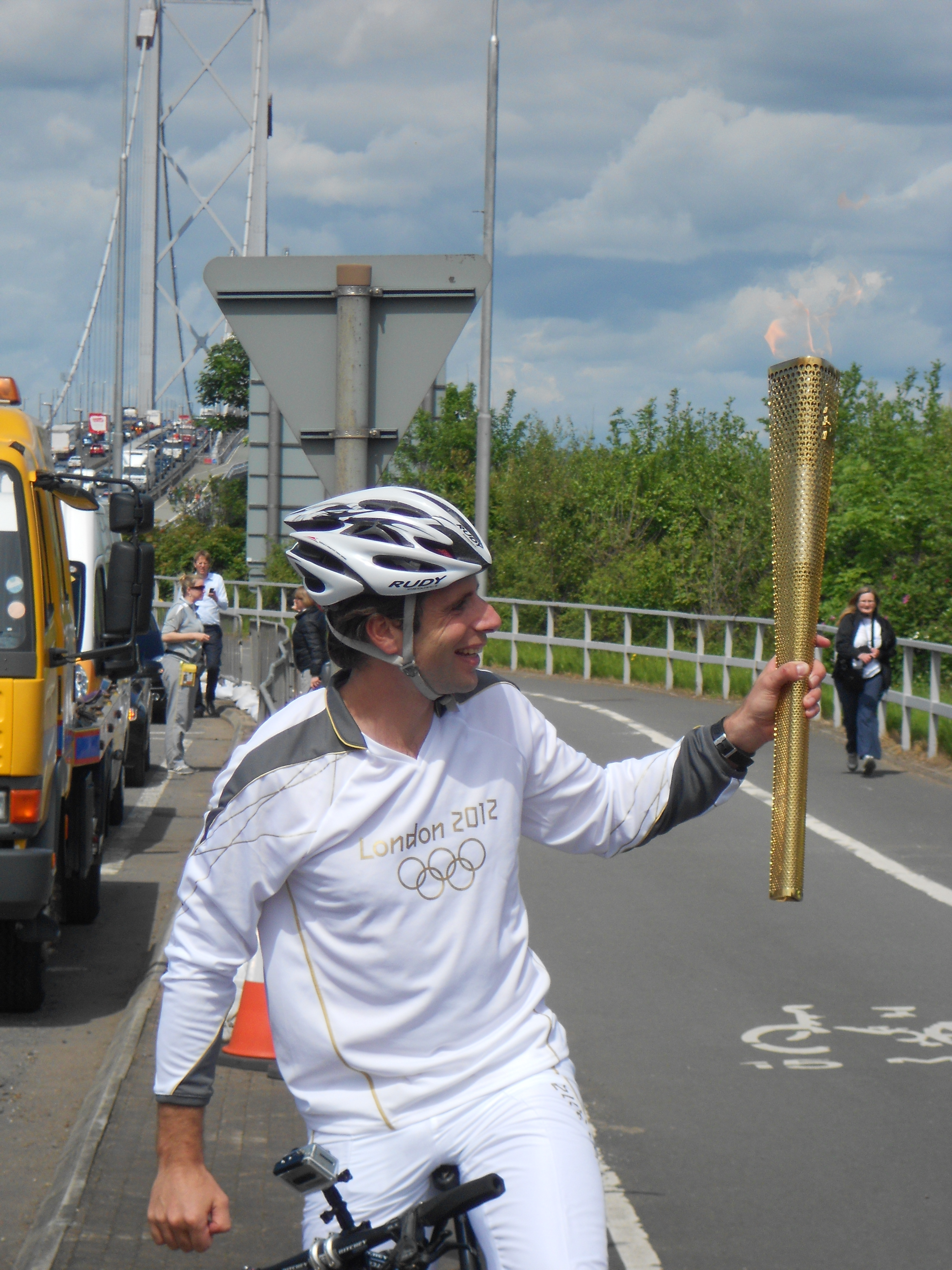
Beaumont carrying the Olympic torch

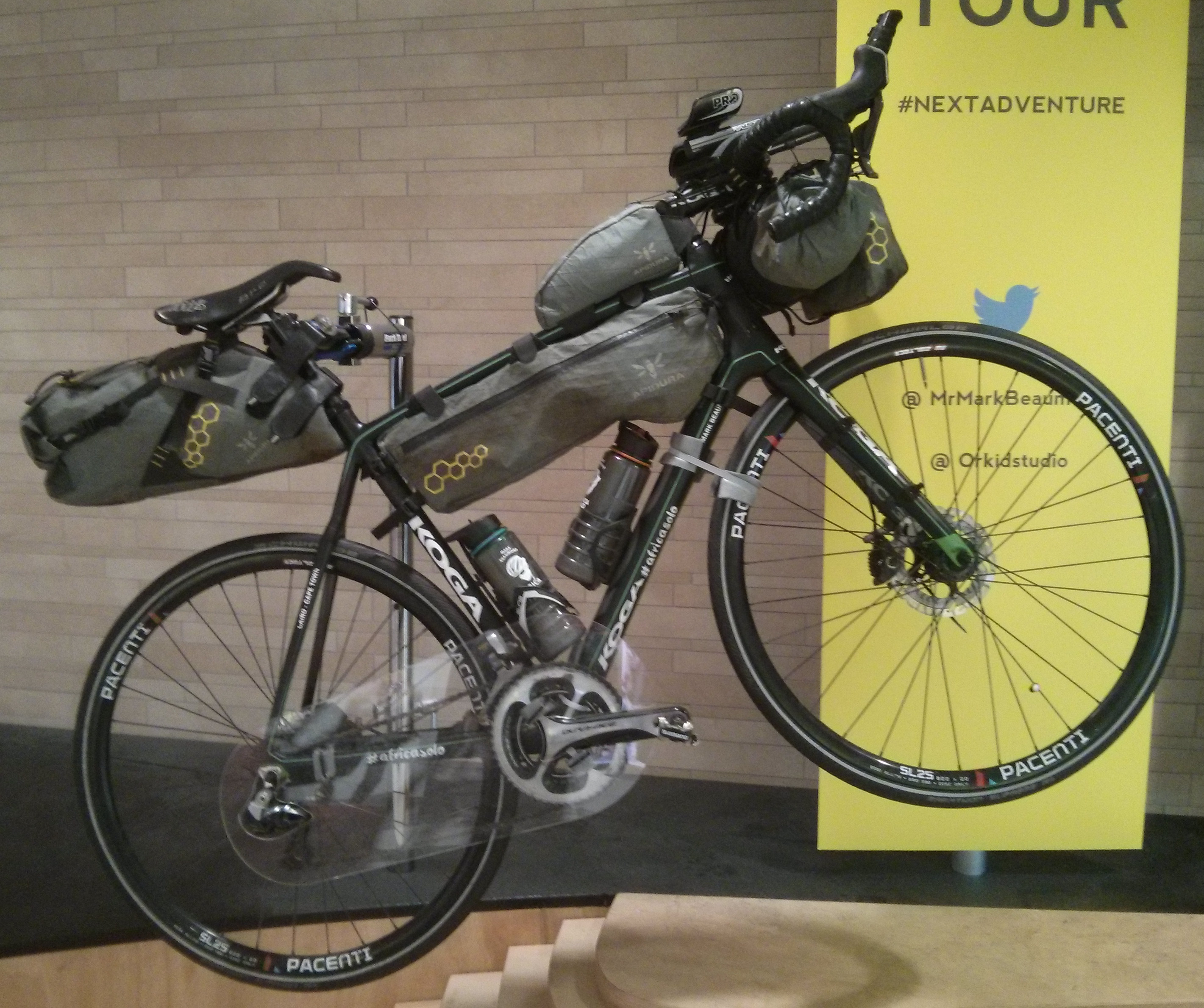
Beaumont's Cairo to Cape Town bicycle

Beaumont was the first torchbearer on day 26 of the 2012 Summer Olympics torch relay.

In May 2015, Beaumont set a new record in his "Africa Solo" challenge, cycling from Cairo to Cape Town in 42 days, and beating the previous record by 17 days. The bike he rode for this and the subsequent North Coast 500 challenge was a Koga Solacio which is on display at Edinburgh Airport.

In November 2015, Beaumont set the record for completing the North Coast 500 (a 518.7-mile route around Scotland) by bicycle in 37 hours 56 minutes and 44 seconds. This effort was later beaten in 2016 by James McCallum, who completed the route in 31 hours. In 2022 he reclaimed the record set by Robbie Mitchell in 2021, by finishing the route in 28 hours and 35 minutes.

In June 2018, Beaumont attempted the hour record (paced) on the penny-farthing, which at the time had stood for 132 years. Beaumont came just under a mile short of the record, but did manage to set a new British record for the category.

== Media ==
=== Television ===
- The Man Who Cycled the World: A four-part BBC documentary broadcast in August 2008. The content was based on Beaumont's video diaries of the journey. The documentary was nominated for a Scottish BAFTA.
- The Man Who Cycled The Americas: This three-part BBC documentary was broadcast on 10 May 2010.

=== Literature ===
- The Man Who Cycled the World: Beaumont's first book, and the best selling cycling book in the UK for 2010 and 2011
- The Man Who Cycled The Americas
- Africa Solo: My World Record Race from Cairo to Cape Town
- Around the World in 80 Days: My World Record Breaking Adventure
- Endurance: How to Cycle Further

Academic offices
Preceded by Brian Cox	Rector of the University of Dundee; 2016–2019	Succeeded by Jim Spence
