= Cristina Spínola =

Spanish journalist

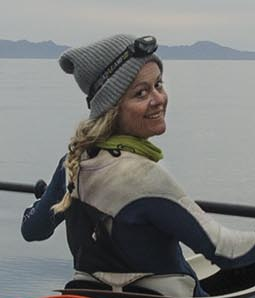
- Kayaking off Loreto, Baja California Sur in January 2018
- Born: Cristina García Spínola de Brito; 27 June 1976 (age 50); Santa Brígida, Las Palmas, Canary Islands, Spain
- Education: Complutense University of Madrid
- Occupations: Journalist, athlete, writer, YouTuber
- Website: www.solaenbici.com

Cristina García Spínola de Brito (born 27 June 1976) is a Spanish journalist, athlete, television reporter, writer, and YouTuber. She is the first Spanish woman to ride around the world on a bicycle without technical support.

== Career ==
Cristina García Spínola was born in 1976 in Santa Brígida, a community of Las Palmas, Gran Canaria. She graduated in journalism at the Complutense University of Madrid in 1999. From 1994 to 1998 she worked as a journalist at La Provincia – Diario de Las Palmas. From 1999 to 2009, she was a reporter and presenter at Antena 3 TV, Televisión Española (TVE), and Televisión Canaria.

At TVE she began her activism for women's rights. In 2005, she presented a current events program where most of the cases involved gender violence and were very brutal. She realized that her journalistic vocation should be accompanied by a social commitment, and she started campaigning for women's rights by bicycle. In 2005 she traveled alone on her bicycle through the seven Canary Islands with "La ruta por la igualdad", an initiative that allowed her to pedal from El Hierro to Lanzarote promulgating gender equality. This adventure culminated in the book Sola, Ruta por la Igualdad (2006), and opened up the possibility of a more extensive journey under the same motto. Her 2016 book Taller de Felicidad, Claves para Crear la Vida que Quieres (Happiness Workshop, Keys to Creating the Life You Want) tell of her experience of personal development, how she overcame her limits to take the first step, and start a life of travel. Her 2018 book Sola en bici: Soñé en grande y toqué el cielo (Alone on a Bike, I Dreamed Big and Touched the Sky) tells of her tour around the world by bicycle, mostly solo, which took place from 2014 to 2017, and that led her to travel about 30,000 km through 27 countries.

=== Around the world by bicycle ===
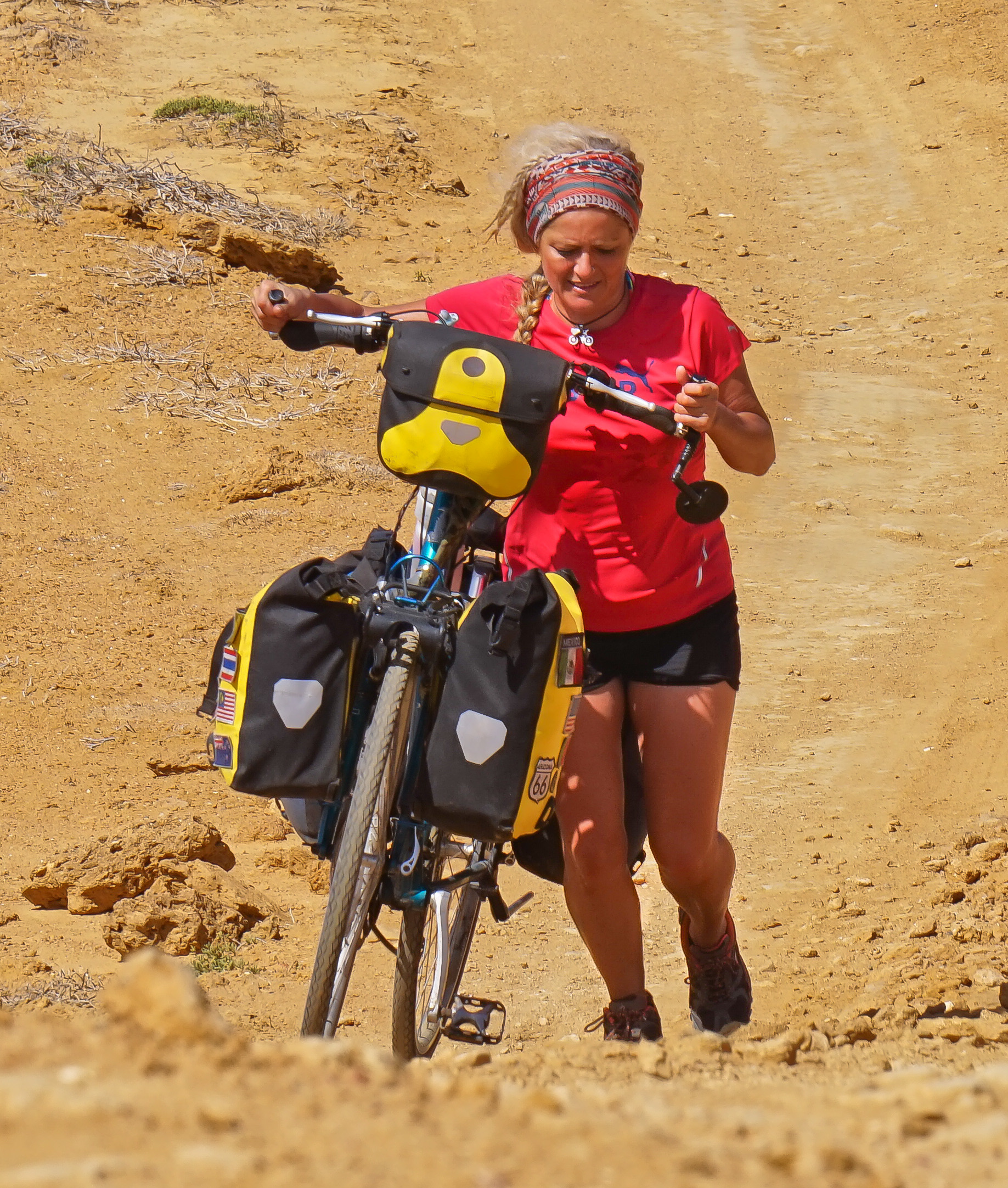
In Punta Gallinas, Colombia in 2015

In March 2014 Cristina Spínola flew to South Africa with her bicycle in a crate. From there she started pedaling to Ethiopia, passing through Mozambique, Malawi, Tanzania, and Kenya. In Addis Ababa she took a plane, and since she was not traveling with a man, in Saudi Arabia she was not given the necessary visa to cross the Middle East. She crossed the Indian Ocean to Mumbai, crossed India to Nepal, from there to Southeast Asia, then Singapore, Indonesia, and New Zealand. From there she flew to Los Angeles. Cycling from Los Angeles to the Strait of Magellan took her three years and one month.

The purpose of Spínola's trip was to promote equality between men and women and the empowerment of women in all spheres of society. Her intention was to be the inspiration that some women need to rid themselves of the chains imposed by society, so that the only chains present in their lives are those of their bicycles. During her tour of the world by bicycle she escaped an attempted rape, an attack with a machete, and having a rifle pointed at her. On 21 April 2017, she successfully finished her journey in Ushuaia, Argentina, becoming the first Spanish woman to go around the world on a bicycle without technical support, pedaling for three years and one month in 27 countries and traveling 30,000 km.

=== 45 days alone in a kayak ===
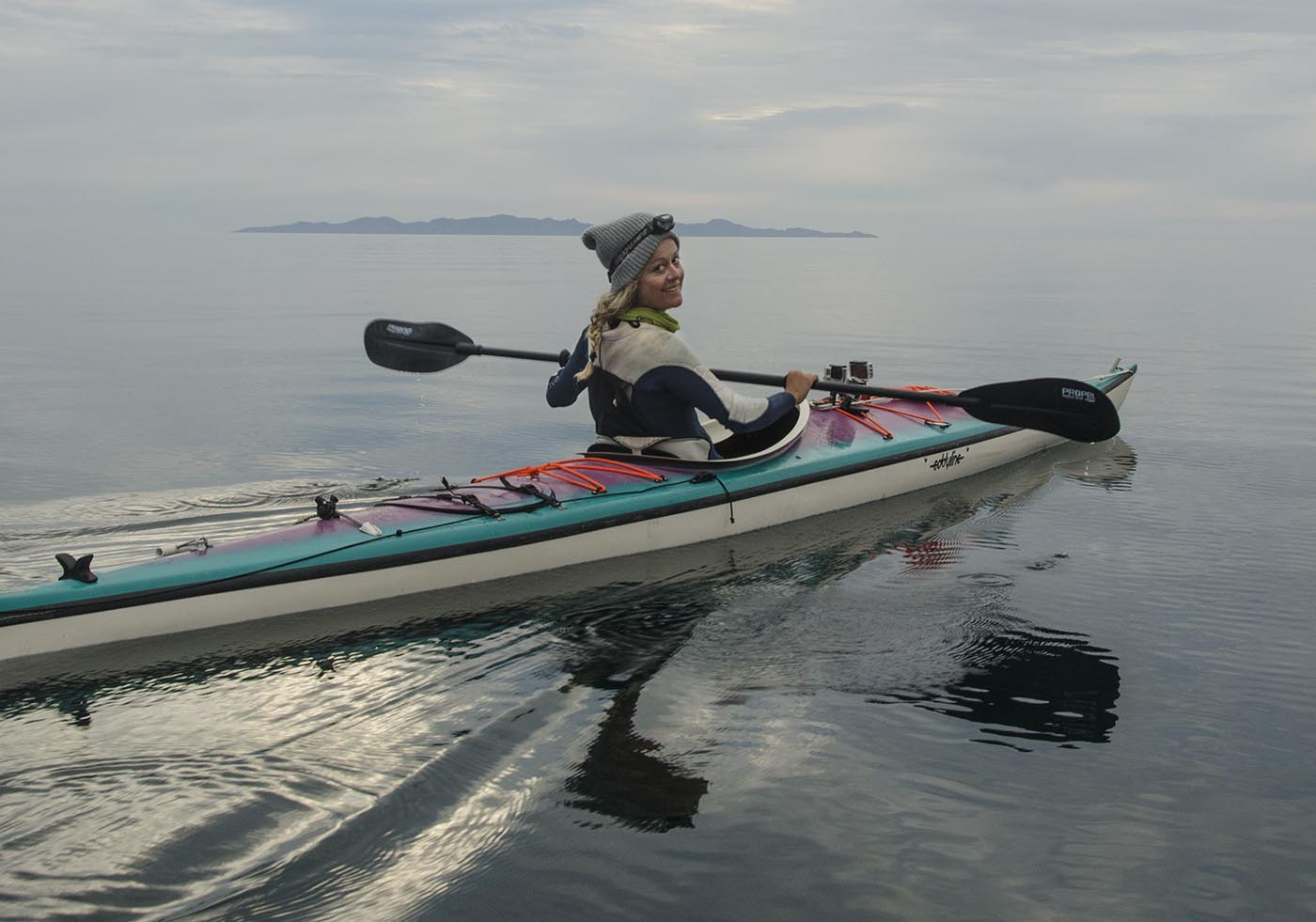
45 days alone in a kayak in the Gulf of California

In late December 2017, Spínola undertook another great challenge – to travel the Baja California Peninsula from north to south alone aboard a kayak. Although her intention was to complete this voyage in two months, bad weather and the lack of water extended it to three months, with 45 days of navigation. She again had no technical support, randomly staying overnight on the coast of the Mexican peninsula and facing shortages of food and water in desert areas.

== Works ==
- Sola, Ruta por la Igualdad (Cabildo de Gran Canaria, 2006), ISBN 9788460988458
- Taller de Felicidad, Claves para Crear la Vida que Quieres (2016), ISBN 9781530280087
- Sola en bici: Soñé en grande y toqué el cielo (Ediciones Casiopea, 2018), ISBN 9788494724763

== Awards and recognitions ==
- 2015: Recognition of Women United for Gender Equality Towards Integral and Sustainable Development
- 2018: "40 Years of Revista Viajar" Award
