= Vedangi Kulkarni =

Indian adventurer

- Born: 1998 (age 27–28); Pune, India
- Known for: Endurance cycling

Vedangi Kulkarni (born 1998) is an Indian endurance cyclist. In 2018 at the age of 20, she became the youngest woman to cycle the globe.

== Biography ==
Kulkarni comes from Pune, India. She studies sports management at Bournemouth University, United Kingdom.

== Record attempt ==
Preparations for the record attempt began in 2016. The journey began in Perth, Australia in June 2018 and ended in Kolkata, India. It involved cycling a total of 29,000 km in 159 days, pedalling over 300 km a day, spanning 14 countries. Some hurdles she faced along the journey involved being chased by a grizzly bear in Canada, camping alone for multiple nights in the Russian snow, and being robbed at knife-point in Spain. She did not have anyone accompanying her for 80 percent of the journey. Kulkarni encountered temperatures ranging from -20 degrees Celsius to 37 degrees Celsius.
