= IncaDivide Race =

Ultra-distance cycling race

The IncaDivide Race is a yearly, self-supported, ultra-distance cycling race across the territory of the Incas in South America and organized by the French organization BikingMan. The first edition took the participants through Ecuador and Peru in 2017. This is the first self-supported race to take place in South America. The inaugural edition route was about 3,500 kilometres (2,200 mi) long and went along some sections of the Qhapaq ñan, the legendary inca road network that was built by the Inca civilization. The main challenge of the race lies in its high altitude route and the challenging weather conditions of the Andes. All cyclists have to cycle across the Andes Cordillera with high passes above 4,000 metres (13,000 ft) on remote andean tracks and random road conditions. The inaugural race was held the 1st of July 2017. 17 athletes attempted to complete it but only 6 could reach the finish line. The fastest rider took less than 17 days to cycle from Quito to Cuzco.

It is an ultra bikepacking race where riders must strategically choose how much time to devote to riding, resting, and refueling each day. They must ride self-supported and carry their own repair equipment, clothing and fueling. It is not a stage race, the clock never stops from the moment the riders leave the start to the moment that they reach the finish. Orienteering plays a major role as most of the route has to be completed in high mountains with different dirt roads options.

Being self-supported means that drafting is not allowed, receiving any form of support from other racers, friends, or family is not allowed; all food, accommodation, repairs, etc., must be purchased from commercial sources if they can find any on the road. The organizer provides a survival map with basic information on the route (recommended route, paved and unpaved sections), a GPS tracking system to control progression and potential cheating and a road book to learn the basics of the local culture of Ecuador and Peru.

== Organization and live tracking ==
The race's founder and main organizer is Axel Carion, who owns the world record of cycling the whole length of South America by bicycle. He has cycled twice across the Andes Cordillera and spent 234 days in the Andes during two bicycle expeditions in 2015 and 2017.

Rider positions are monitored using GPS satellite-based tracker devices mounted on participants' bikes that upload their positions to the website for the participants and followers to view. Each participant can use an SOS function to warn the organization, in case of a life-threatening situation.

A media car, during the race, is dedicated to share live content from the racers' experience in the Andes and produces images and videos of their performance. Some sections of the race were so remote in 2017 that the media car had troubles to follow-up with the leaders of the race.

== Rules and results ==
Rules are listed on the official website. The idea of self-supported or unsupported bicycle racing is a key component, and any type of bicycle is allowed, including recumbent bicycles. One of the rider of the inaugural edition, Bernard Cauquil, winner of the Suntrip race in 2015 was riding a recumbent bicycle.

The main results are summarized in the table below. It is notable that only one woman racing SOLO has completed the race so far. A great variety of bicycles was displayed at race start (road, cyclo-cross, mountain bicycle) revealing the strategy of the racers. The route is a mix of paved and very challenging unpaved roads. The bicycle strategy plays a major role to finish the race.

In 2018, only one athlete has completed the full "mandatory route" of 1800 km and 31000m: Marco Beligni ITA 174h 52min. Other athletes made the decisions to cut the route between checkpoints to reach the finishline by the shortest distance.

In 2019, 44 participants took the start of the third edition, following an 8-shaped race course with a length of 1650 km. Again crossing the Huascarán National Park National Park, they rode up to nearly 5,000m of altitude, passing by the Pasto Ruri glacier. Only 12 of them managed to reach the finishline before the 10-days time-limit.

Year	Distance	Total elevation	Start of the race	Finish-line	Starters	Finishers	1st (time)	2nd	3rd	1st female (time)
2017	3,500 kilometres (2,200 mi)	63,000 metres (207,000 ft)	Quito (Ecuador)	Cuzco (Peru)	17	6	Rodney Soncco (Peru) (16d 21h)	Felipe Borja (19d 14h) (Ecuador)	Mario Villegas (20d 10h) (Ecuador)	Yoshie Yabu (24d 7h) (Japan)
2018	1,800 km (1,120 mi)	31,000m (101,700 ft)	Trujillo (Peru)	Trujillo (Peru)	35	22	Rodney Soncco (Peru) (127 hours and 22 minutes)	Michelangelo Pacifico (Italy) (145h10min)	Niel Copeland (United Kingdom) (145h58min)	N/A
2019	1,650 km (1,025 mi)	32,500m (106,600 ft)	Trujillo (Peru)	Trujillo (Peru)	44	12	Sofiane Sehili (France) (135 hours and 35 minutes)	Rodney Soncco (Peru) (150 hours and 39 minutes)	Giona Uccelli (Italy) (157 hours and 44 minutes)	Victoria De Sa (riding in Pair with Bruno Rosa) (Brazil) (210 hours 09 minutes)

== History and highlights of the race ==
The IncaDivide idea was born while its founder Axel Carion, from BikingMan, was cycling the Bolivian South Lipez on a loaded touring bike (60 kg) at nearly 5,000 metres (16,000 ft) having to carry his own food and water for 7 days without villages. He wanted to share the experience of riding a bicycle at high altitude. Peru hides some the best road conditions of the Andes, several high passes above 4,400 metres (14,400 ft) and one of the highest paved roads on the planet.

The IncaDivide name was a tribute to the popular Tour Divide mountain bike race. The self-supported nature of the IncaDivide makes it very different from supported ultra-distance events like the Race Across America (RAAM), in which each racer has a large support crew with multiple vehicles. All such support is prohibited to keep the carbon footprint of the race to a minimum. Ultra-distance audax and randonneuring cycling events are different from IncaDivide as drafting is allowed in those, there is no classification and the event organizers often provide support at the control points.

The high altitude of the Andes Cordillera, the weather conditions with important temperature variations (from −5 °C (23 °F) to 40 °C (104 °F)), the remoteness of several sections and its natural wilderness of the IncaDivide makes it a supreme challenge for experienced athletes. The 2017 route implied to battle the Andes Cordillera of Ecuador and the avenue of the volcanoes and the Amazon rainforest difficult climate. The high altitude experience really started once the racers had reached Cajamarca in Peru. They had to cycle through the Canyon del Pato (37 tunnels), along the Cordillera Bianca to reach the Yanashalla pass at 4,710 metres (15,450 ft). The Junin region, known for it lake (the largest one in Peru) was a challenging section with its semi-wild pampa. Reaching Cusco finally consisted in battling 5 passes in the Huancayo province.

Checkpoints locations vary every year and are selected because of their strong historical link with the Inca empire and/or cultural link with the actual Peruvian culture. In 2017, Vilcabamba (CP1) is the village where the Incas established the small Neo-Inca State before being conquered by the Spanish in 1572. Cajamarca (CP2) is a city where the Inca emperor Atahualpa was captured during the battle of Cajamarca in 1532. Huaraz (CP3) is the capital city of Ancash region and is famous around the world for its Cordillera Blanca and its peaks above 6,000 metres (20,000 ft) in the Huascarán National Park. A bonus loop suggested by the organization, in the inaugural edition, was to ride up to Punta Olimpica pass at 4,736 metres (15,538 ft). It remained unbeaten in 2017. Huancayo (CP4), situated in the Mantaro Valley, at an altitude of 3,271 metres (10,732 ft) was a central stop on the Inca Camino Real. The finish-line Cusco, situated in southeastern Peru, was the capital city of the Inca Empire.

Year	Start of the race	Checkpoint 1 (CP1)	Checkpoint 2 (CP2)	Checkpoint 3 (CP3)	Checkpoint 4 (CP4)	Finish-line
2017	Quito (Ecuador)	Vilcabamba (Ecuador)	Cajamarca (Peru)	Huaraz (Peru)	Huancayo (Peru)	Cusco (Peru)
2018	Trujillo (Peru)	Cajamarca (Peru)	Huaraz (Peru)	Casma (Peru)	N/A	Trujillo (Peru)
2019	Trujillo (Peru)	Cajamarca (Peru)	Carhuaz (Peru)	Carhuaz (Peru)	N/A	Trujillo (Peru)
