= Steffen Streich =

German bicyclist

Steffen Streich is a German ultra-endurance bicycle racer living in Greece, who won the 2015 "Trans Africa Bicycle Race".

== Biography ==
Streich, who was born in East Berlin, Germany lives and trains on the island of Lesbos in Greece. In 2015, Streich won the Trans Afrika Bicycle Race from Beitbridge to Cape Town with a time of 8 days 19 hours and 28 minutes, setting a new record for the event. In 2016, Streich was leading the Trans Am Bike Race with 110 miles to go. Unfortunately, on the final morning he woke and in confusion, started out in the wrong direction. He realized his error when he encountered Lael Wilcox, an American woman who had been forty miles behind. The two met in Bumpass, Virginia. Streich realized his mistake and turned, and offered to ride with Wilcox to the end, and helped her when she missed a turn. From that point, Wilcox sprinted away to become the first woman to win a major ultra-distance bikepacking race. Streich competed in the 2017 Indian Pacific Wheel Race, a 5,500 kilometer race across Australia. On the fourteenth day of the race, the second-placed rider Mike Hall was struck by a car and killed, causing the race to be cancelled. Streich was in eight place at the time and was one of only a handful of people who decided to complete the course.

In 2018 Streich won the inaugural North Cape-Tarifa bicycle adventure, a 7400 km self supported race from the North Cape to Tarifa. After a race between the leaders Samuli Mäkinen, Kai Edel and Streich till Germany, Streich was in the lead till Col du Galibier. In La Grave France Kai Edel took over the lead and Streich in second position. At the top of Pico del Veleta, Streich took back the lead and finished in 21 days and 57 minutes, 12 hours and 5 minutes before Kai Edel. Streich cycled the last stretch of 757 km, 12,512 m vertical climbing into Tarifa in 44h.
