= Kristof Allegaert =

Belgian cyclist

- Born: 1976 (age 49–50)
- Occupation: Secondary school teacher
- Known for: Winner of ultra-distance bicycle races
- Website: allegaertk.wordpress.com

Kristof Allegaert is a Belgian cyclist who specializes in ultra-distance cycling races and lives in Kortrijk, Belgium.

== Randonneur events ==
In 2011 Allegaert attempted to break the record for the Tour de France Randonneur, an unsupported amateur version of the Tour de France. The previous record had been set by Patrick Plaine (13 days, 9 hours and 20 minutes) in 1978. After running into some delays, Allegaert believed that he would fail, but a motivational speech by his wife got him back on the bike. He eventually finished the 4800 km route in a record time of 13 days, 2 hours and 15 minutes.

== Race results ==
Year	Event	Position	Time	Approximate Distance
2013	Transcontinental Race	1st	7 days 13 hours 45 mins	3200 km
2014	Transcontinental Race	1st	7 days 23 hours 0 mins	3600 km
2015	Red Bull Trans Siberian Extreme	1st	13 days 6 hours 57 mins	9200 km
2016	Transcontinental Race	1st	8 days 18 hours 2 mins	3800 km
2017	Indian Pacific Wheel Race	1st	n/a	5500 km

In 2013, 2014 and 2016, Allegaert won the self-supported Transcontinental Race across Europe. The races were about 3,200 to 3,800 km long and the clock never stops from the start to the finish. Allegaert finished each race more than 24 hours ahead of the second-placed rider. During the 2014 race, Allegaert took a ferry across the Bay of Kotor in Montenegro that was not allowed in the race rules, before climbing up to the checkpoint on Mount Lovćen. He therefore had to return to the point of the infringement and ride an allowable route, which cost him over 5 hours, but he still maintained a comfortable lead.

In 2015, Allegaert won the supported Red Bull Trans Siberian Extreme race, which is almost 9,200 km and divided into stages of between 300 and 1,400 km. The total time does not include stops between stages.

In 2017, Allegaert led for most of the 5,500 km-long Indian Pacific Wheel Race. The race was cancelled on the morning of the 14th day due to the second-placed rider, Mike Hall, being fatally struck by a car. After being informed of the incident with less than 300 km remaining, Allegaert chose to honor the memory of his comrade by riding almost to the finish line at Sydney Opera House, stopping within sight of it but never actually reaching it.

Reports often state that Allegaert only stops 1–2 hours per day total during unsupported races. However, he often turns his tracker off before overnight stops and turns it back on afterwards and these pauses are not recorded by the automated systems. In reality, he typically stops for an average total of 4–6 hours per 24 hours during these events.

== Equipment ==
2018, Allegaert is currently riding a Curve Cycling Belgie Disc Titanium road bike with Campagnolo gearing and uses Apidura bags.

2014-2017 Allegaert has been riding a Jaegher Interceptor steel road bike with Campagnolo gearing.
