= Transcontinental Race =

Annual European ultra-distance cycling race

Race details
- Date: July/August
- Region: Europe
- Nickname: TCR
- Discipline: Road
- Type: Self-supported, ultra-distance
- Web site: www.lostdot.cc/tcr

History
- First edition: August 3, 2013
- Editions: 11
- First winner: Kristof Allegaert (BEL)
- Most wins: Kristof Allegaert (BEL) 3 wins
- Most recent: Robin Gemperle (SUI)

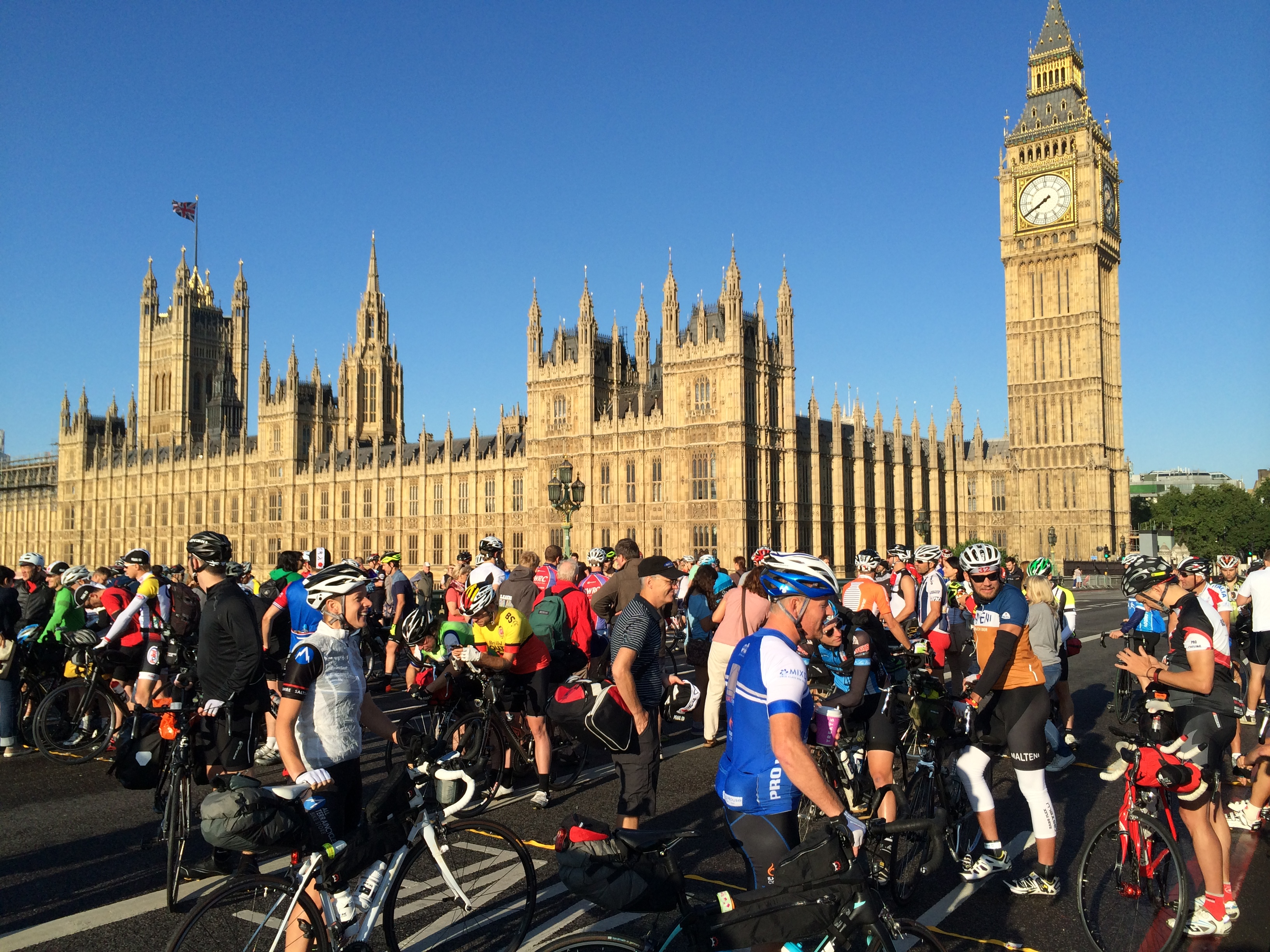
Start of the 2014 Transcontinental Race in front of the Houses of Parliament in London

The Transcontinental Race (TCR) is an annual, self-supported, ultra-distance cycling race across Europe. It is one of the world's toughest ultra-endurance races. The route and distance varies for each edition between about 3,200 and 4,200 km, with the winners generally taking 7 to 10 days. Interest in the race grew rapidly from 30 people starting the first edition of the race in 2013 to over 1,000 people applying for a place in the fourth edition in 2016, 350 of whom were successful; since then, these numbers have been reasonably stable.

It is not a stage race, the clock never stops from the moment the riders leave the start to the moment that they reach the finish, so it is a long individual time trial. Riders must therefore strategically choose how much time to devote to riding, resting, and refuelling each day. Being self-supported or unsupported means that drafting is not allowed, receiving any form of support from other racers is not allowed, nor is it from friends or family; all food, accommodation, repairs, etc., must be purchased from commercial sources.

== Route ==
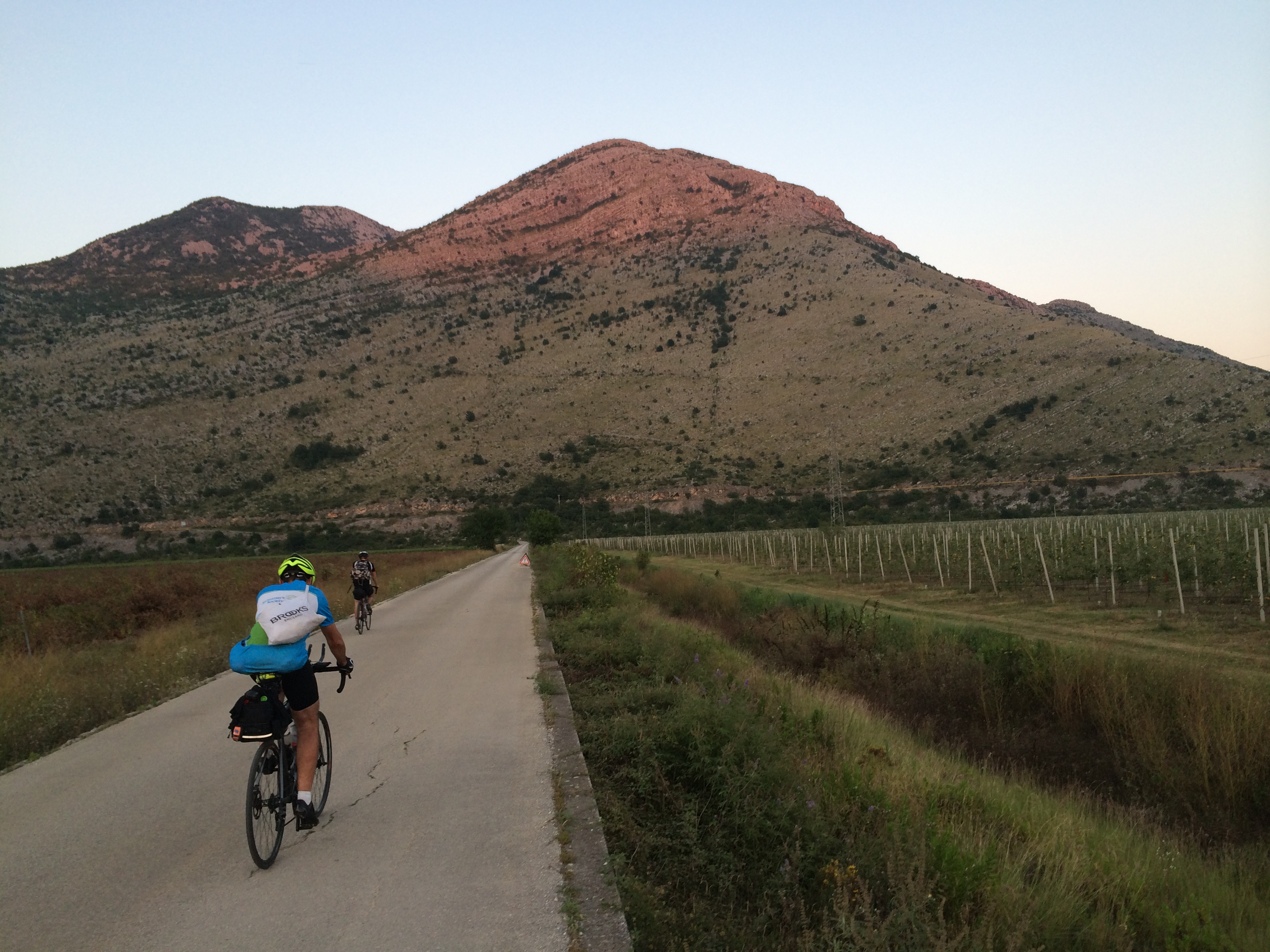
TCR racers in Bosnia

Despite being an individual time trial, there is a mass start, which has most often been in northwestern Europe, two to four intermediate control points must then be reached, and the finish has most often been around southeastern Europe. The 2019 edition went from east to west.

Edition	Approximate Distance (km)	Approximate Ascent (m)	Start	Control point 1	Control point 2	Control point 3	Control point 4	Control point 5	Finish
1. 2013	3,200	30,000	London, UK	Geraardsbergen, Belgium	Stelvio Pass, Italy	—N/a	—N/a	—N/a	Istanbul, Turkey
2. 2014	3,600	30,000	London, UK	Paris, France	Stelvio Pass, Italy	Mount Lovćen, Montenegro	—N/a	—N/a	Istanbul, Turkey
3. 2015	4,200	35,000	Geraardsbergen, Belgium	Mont Ventoux, France	Strada dell'Assietta, Italy	Vukovar, Croatia	Mount Lovćen, Montenegro	—N/a	Istanbul, Turkey
4. 2016	3,800	45,000	Geraardsbergen, Belgium	Clermont-Ferrand, France	Furka Pass, Switzerland	Passo di Giau, Italy	Durmitor Massif, Montenegro	—N/a	Çanakkale, Turkey
5. 2017	4,000	35,000	Geraardsbergen, Belgium	Schloss Lichtenstein, Germany	Monte Grappa, Italy	Tatra Mountains, Slovakia	Transfăgărășan, Romania	—N/a	Meteora, Greece
6. 2018	3,900	35,000	Geraardsbergen, Belgium	Bielerhöhe Pass, Austria	Mangartsko Sedlo, Slovenia	Karkonosze Pass, Poland	Bjelašnica, Bosnia and Herzegovina	—N/a	Meteora, Greece
7. 2019	4,000	40,000	Burgas, Bulgaria	Buzludzha, Bulgaria	Besna Kobila, Serbia	Passo Gardena, Italy – Arlberg Pass, Austria	Alpe d'Huez, France	—N/a	Brest, France
8. 2022	4,500	40,000	Geraardsbergen, Belgium	Krupka, Czechia	Passo di Gavia, Italy	Durmitor National Park, Montenegro	Drumul Strategic, Transalpina, Romania	—N/a	Burgas, Bulgaria
9. 2023	3,900	50,000	Geraardsbergen, Belgium	Passo dello Spluga, Italy	Zgornje Jezersko, Slovenia	Peshkopi, Albania	Meteora, Greece	—N/a	Thessaloniki, Greece
10. 2024	4,000	43,000	Roubaix, France	Mangartsko Sedlo, Slovenia	Bjelašnica, Bosnia	Prevallë, Kosovo	Çanakkale, Turkey	—N/a	Istanbul, Turkey
11. 2025	4,900	45,000	Santiago de Compostela, Spain	Picos de Europa, Spain	Col du Tourmalet, France	Strada dell'Assietta, Italy	Siena-Pacentro, Italy	Burrel, Albania	Constanța, Romania
12. 2026	4,700	-	Trondheim, Norway	Flåm, Norway	Tatras Mountains, Slovakia	Sarajevo, Bosnia and Herzegovina	Leskovik, Albania	—N/a	Kalamata, Greece

Apart from some sections of "parcours" or route that must be ridden near the start, some control points, and the finish, participants are mostly free to choose their own route that they have independently planned. Even so, many riders use the same roads as each other, particularly when choices are limited. All local laws must be adhered to regarding which roads cyclists are allowed to use and the organizers may ban additional roads that they believe are too dangerous.

For the sake of time and efficiency, nearly all participants ride solely on paved, public roads, and so nearly all use road bikes. However, due to routing errors, adventurous planning, or more challenging parcours being chosen by the organizers, some off-road sections are occasionally used.

During the first 7 editions of the race, the most-often used country for the location of a start, control point, or finish was Italy, which featured in 6 editions. Tied for the second-most often visited country are Belgium and France, each with 5 visits, followed by Turkey with 4 and Montenegro with 3. The race visited Asia just twice, with the finish line being on the Asian side of the Dardanelles strait in Turkey for the 2016 edition and on the Asian side of Istanbul for the 2024 edition—which also used the 2016 finish point as CP4.

== Following the race ==
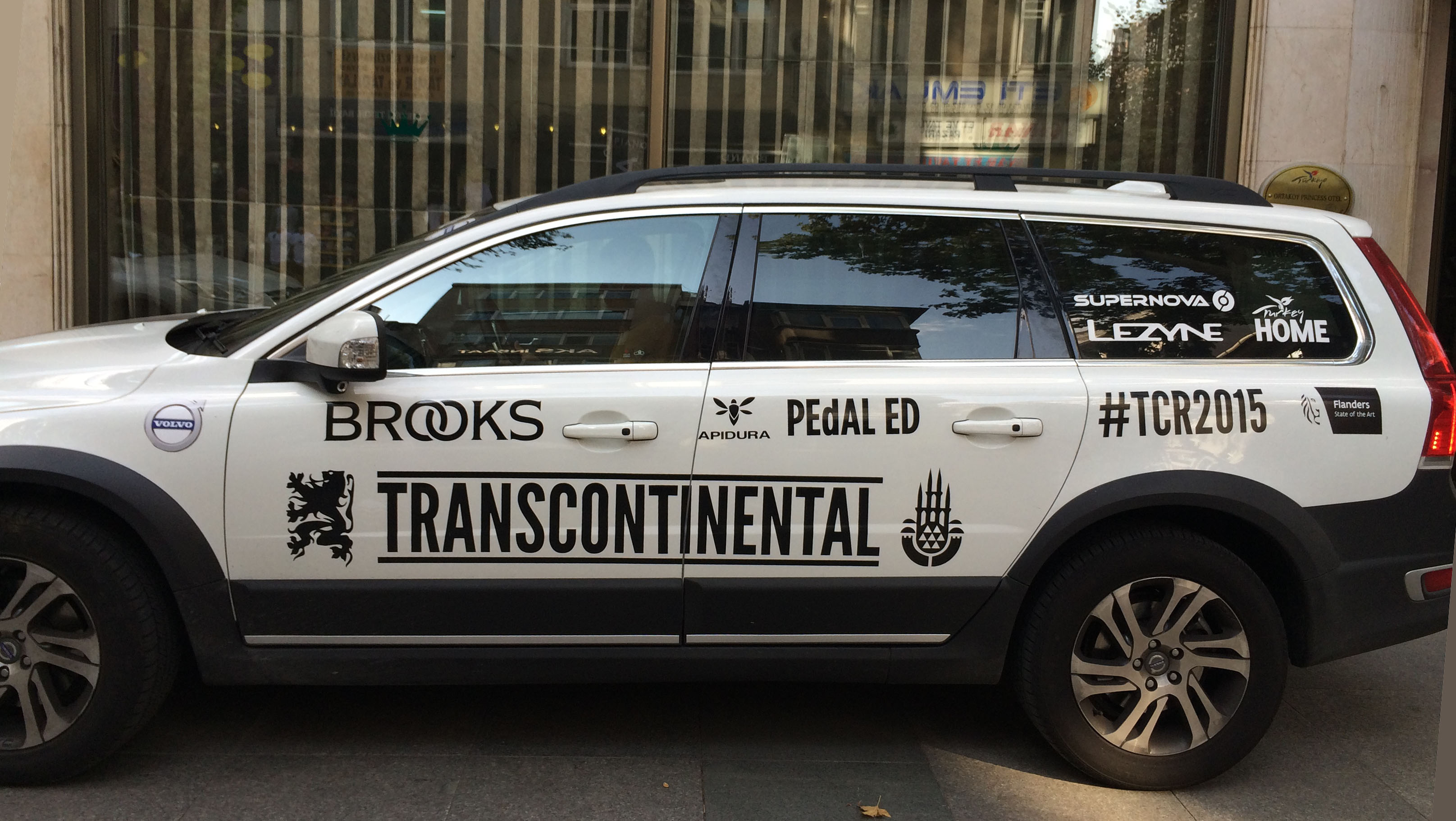
Volvo race vehicle for the 2015 TCR

Racer positions are monitored using GPS satellite-based tracker devices mounted on all participants' bikes that upload their positions every 5 minutes. This information is then posted on the Follow My Challenge website for racers and followers to view. Many participants also update followers on their progress using social media websites.

During the race, volunteers are stationed at each control point to register the passage of each rider. Volunteer "dot watchers" remotely follow the progress of each racer's tracker position and inform the organizers of possible rule violations (e.g., individual riders appearing to ride together for extended periods or people riding on prohibited roads).

== Rules ==
Rules are listed on the official website and in the Race Manual. The idea of self-supported or unsupported bicycle racing is a key component. Drafting is not allowed, receiving any form of support from other racers is not allowed (which includes sharing food and equipment), and neither is receiving support from friends, family, etc. (again including food and equipment). Social/emotional support is allowed, but information should not be shared between different racers or between racers and their supporters once the race has begun. All supplies, accommodation, repairs, etc., must be purchased from commercial sources that are equally available to all participants. Since the 2015 edition, in addition to the solo race category, a pairs category has existed in which riders may draft the other person in the pair and they may share equipment. The rules concerning the type of bicycle that can be used and the equipment that must be carried are minimal. To ensure that everyone is riding somewhat similar equipment, recumbent bicycles are not allowed and neither are tandem bicycles.

== Results ==
The main results are summarized in the table below:

Year	1st Overall (Time)	1st Woman	2nd Overall	3rd Overall	1st Pair
2013	Kristof Allegaert (Belgium) (7d 14h)	Juliana Buhring (United Kingdom) (Germany)	Richard Dunnett (United Kingdom)	Matt Wilkins (Australia)	—N/a
2014	Kristof Allegaert (Belgium) (7d 23h)	Pippa Handley (United Kingdom)	Josh Ibbett (United Kingdom)	Richard Dunnett (United Kingdom)	—N/a
2015	Josh Ibbett (United Kingdom) (9d 23h)	Jayne Wadsworth (United Kingdom)	Alexandre Bourgeonnier (France)	Tomáš Navrátil (Czech Republic)	Timothy France (United Kingdom) & Neil Phillips (United Kingdom)
2016	Kristof Allegaert (Belgium) (8d 15h)	Emily Chappell (United Kingdom)	Neil Phillips (United Kingdom)	Carlos Mazón (Spain)	Andrew Boyd (United Kingdom) & James Stannard (United Kingdom)
2017	James Hayden (United Kingdom) (9d 2h)	Melissa Pritchard (United States)	Björn Lenhard (Germany)	Jonas Goy (Switzerland)	Anders Syvertsen (Norway) & Eivind Tandrevold (Norway) (13d 21h 05m)
2018	James Hayden (United Kingdom) (8d 23h 59m)	Ede Harrison (United Kingdom) (13d 19h 32m)	Matthew Falconer (United Kingdom) (9d 23h 42m)	Björn Lenhard (Germany) (10d 0h 36m)	Luca Somm (Switzerland) & Oliver Bieri (Switzerland) (14d 08h 23m)
2019	Fiona Kolbinger (Germany) (10d 2h 48m)	Fiona Kolbinger (Germany)	Ben Davies (United Kingdom) (10d 13h 10m)	Job Hendrickx (Netherlands) (10d 15h 48m)	Espen Landgraff (Norway) & Emmanuel Verde (Norway) (13d 13h 46m)
2022	Christoph Strasser (Austria) (9d 15h 00m)	Fiona Kolbinger (Germany) (10d 13h 44m)	Adam Bialek (Germany) (9d 23h 22m)	Pawel Pulawski (Poland) (10d 2h 06m)	Théo Daniel (France) & Stephane Ouaja (France) (12d 2h 12m)
2023	Christoph Strasser (Austria) (8d 16h 30m)	Jaimi Wilson (United Kingdom) (11d 7h 39m)	Robin Gemperle (Switzerland) (8d 22h 47m)	Tim de Witte (Belgium) (9d 10h 12m)	Sherry Cardona (Colombia) & Gereon Tewes (Germany) (10d 21h 42m)
2024	Robin Gemperle (Switzerland) (8d 23h 59m)	Jana Kesenheimer (Germany) (11d 3h 57m)	Christoph Strasser (Austria) (9d 4h 32m)	Tim de Witte (Belgium) (9d 13h 11m)	Sherry Cardona (Colombia) & Gereon Tewes (Germany) (11d 12h 56m)
2025	Victor Bosoni (France) (10d 18h 44m, 2h 6m time penalty)	Jana Kesenheimer (Germany) (12d 3h 56m, 24m time penalty)	Martin Moritz (Germany) (10d 23h 48m)	David Tschan (Switzerland) (11d 3h 21m)	Matthew Garthwaite & Oliver Hayward (13d 16h 47m)
2026	Robin Gemperle (Switzerland) (10d 8h 55m)				

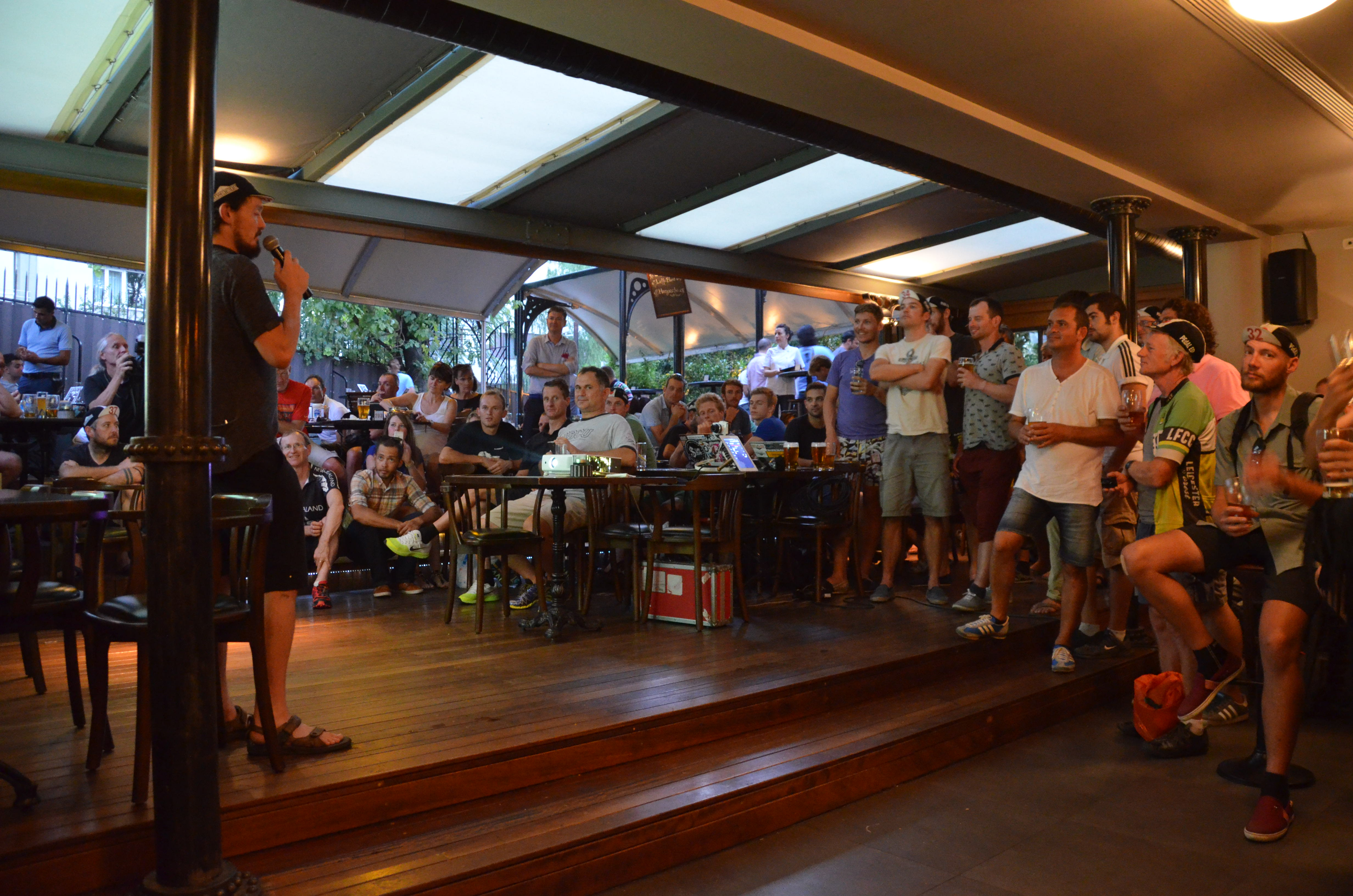
Finish party for the 2014 TCR, with Mike Hall on the microphone

Many people who are not competing to win tend to have the goal of arriving before the finish party at the end of the 15th or 16th day. Since 2016, a distinction has been made between people finishing in the "general classification" and those that are simply "finishers". To be awarded a place in the general classification, riders must adhere to the principles of being self-supported and also pass each of the checkpoints before it officially closes, which requires riding approximately 250 km per day.

Full results from all editions can be found on DotWatcher.cc.

== Organization ==
The race was founded by the English cyclist Mike Hall, who won several similar events: In 2012 he set the Around the world cycling record, in 2013 and 2016 he won the Tour Divide, and in 2014 he won the TransAm Bicycle Race.

Mike Hall was the main organizer from 2013 until 2016, with The Adventurists helping to organize the first edition. After Mike Hall's death in early 2017, the remaining members of the Transcontinental Race team created the Lost Dot organization to administer the race.

== Criticisms and risks ==
Contact between the organizers and participants is minimal outside of the checkpoints (although an emergency number is provided to all riders) and not all checkpoints are staffed 24 hours per day. Riders' satellite trackers can also fail, which is typically due to the tracker's batteries going flat despite riders being encouraged to carry spares and to change them at certain intervals. Many forms of cheating are possible due to the lack of monitoring, including the use of performance-enhancing substances. The organizers hope that an honor system is sufficient to curb violations, and in 2015 an online form was created for people to submit reports of rule-breaking. It is impossible to know how big a problem cheating actually is, but it is hoped that it is low since winning has no monetary value.

Organizers have given a thorough explanation about the process used for selecting which applicants are awarded a place. Previous volunteers are given preference, followed by applicants who improve the demographic diversity. The remainder who display sufficient understanding of the requirements and risk in their application are entered into a simple lottery.

Up to half of the riders who start the race may not reach the finish for various reasons, but this proportion varies every year. This indicates that the degree of difficulty is high, that some riders may not have prepared sufficiently for this type of race, and that so many different things can go wrong in an event of this length.

In 2017, Frank Simons was killed in a hit and run collision 5 hours after starting the race in Belgium. Other serious accidents have occurred leading to participants receiving hospital treatment.

The frequency of such incidents should be contrasted with the distances ridden, with an estimated 2,000,000 km being ridden in total by participants during the first six editions of the race. The organizers have improved safety by stating which roads are not allowed and imposing penalties on participants who ride on them. For 2016, the finish was moved away from Istanbul due to safety concerns. also, the control points for 2016 were chosen to keep riders away from areas that have been found to be particularly dangerous in the past.

== Similar races ==
This form of ultra-distance, unsupported bike racing first became popular with the Tour Divide mountain bike race, which was first held as a mass-start event in 2008 and goes over the Rocky Mountains from Alberta, Canada, through the USA and finishes at the Mexican border in New Mexico. The Trans Am Bike Race started in 2014 is more similar because it is primarily on paved roads, but it uses the TransAmerica Trail as a fixed route from the Pacific coast in Oregon, USA, to the Atlantic Coast in Virginia. Following the success of these events, many others were launched in subsequent years.

In Europe, the Transiberica, the Three Peaks Bike Race, and the Race Through Poland, all established in 2018, are major free-route unsupported races, covering distances from 1,500 up to 3,000 km.

The self-supported nature of the TCR makes it very different from supported ultra-distance events like the Race Across America (RAAM), in which each racer has a large support crew with multiple vehicles. All such support is prohibited in the TCR and similar races that are described as self-supported or unsupported. Ultra-distance audax and randonneuring cycling events are somewhat similar, except that drafting is allowed in those and the race organizers may provide support at the control points.
