= Sarah Hammond =

Australian cyclist

Sarah Hammond is an Australian ultra-endurance bicycle racer who in 2014 became the first woman to Everest by riding the equivalent of the height of Mount Everest in a 24-hour period and has won the Race to the Rock for three consecutive years.

== History ==
Hammond is from Melbourne, Australia, where she was associated with a local cycling group known as Hells 500, the group that created the Everesting challenge. After her first Everest in 2014, she attracted the attention of ultra-endurance cyclist, Jesse Carlsson, who suggested her endurance would have indicated a proficiency in the sport. In 2016, she entered her first endurance race, the 7,000 kilometer Trans Am Bike Race. She was the first woman to lead the race, and did so for over a week, before lost time due to a wrong turn left her in a sixth-place finish. A few months later, she won the inaugural Race to the Rock, a 3,000 kilometer ultra endurance race from Adelaide, Australia to Uluru (also known as Ayers Rock). She was the only female participant, and was in the lead at William Creek. When she became aware of the conditions ahead at Oodnadatta, she continued through the night without sleep. Due to this effort, she managed to cross flooded roads and mud pits before they became completely impassable. Conditions continued to deteriorate, and Hammond was the only participant to complete the race. In 2017, once again the only female participant, she again won the race, being one of five cyclists to overcome the difficulties of the trail and complete the race. She won the race, billed by Carlsson as "the race so hard no man has ever won it", for the third consecutive year in 2018.
