= Jesse Carlsson =

Australian BMX world champion

Jesse Carlsson is an Australian BMX age-group world champion, theoretical physics PhD, ultra-distance cycling competitor and businessman.

== Ultra-distance racing ==
=== Tour Divide ===
Carlsson placed second in the 2013 Tour Divide.

=== Trans Am Bike Race ===
In 2015, Carlsson won the Trans Am Bike Race, a 4,250 mile race across the United States in a time less than 19 days, more than 35 hours ahead of the next finishers.

=== Race to the Rock ===
In 2016, Carlsson designed and promoted an ultra-endurance race from Adelaide, Australia to Uluru, called the Race to the Rock. Although Carlsson, as a competitor in the first edition of the race took an early lead, he was forced to retire when he broke his wrist.

=== Indian Pacific Wheel Race ===
In 2017, Carlsson designed the Indian Pacific Wheel Race, a 5,500 kilometer road race across the continent of Australia. In the course of the first race, Mike Hall was killed by a motorist. Carlsson was a competitor in the event, but had to withdraw due to injury. Due to the tragic death of Hall, the event was cancelled in progress. In 2018, Carlsson organized a second edition of the race, before cancelling it due to legal issues from the tragedy. In the end, many riders came and rode as a tribute to Hall, without an official race being held.

== Business ==
Carlsson is a director of Curve Cycling.
