= Nathalie Baillon =

French ultra-distance cyclist

Nathalie Baillon is a French ultra-distance cyclist.

In 2023, she became the first woman to cross Europe from South to North, covering more than 6,400 km in 19 days, at an average speed of about 14.3 km/h, including stops.

She won the 2025 Tour Divide women’s race, arriving in Antelope Wells after 16 days, 10 hours, and 17 minutes, finishing 21st overall in a field of over 200 competitors. In August 2025 she wins the overall ranking of "Les Geants", a 400 km and +10,500m gravel race, in 28h and 7 minutes. The event had a 42% finisher rate within the 48-hour time limit.

== Palmarès ==
Year	Event	Place	Distance, Elevation	Duration	Women's Position	Overall Position
2019	Race Across France 2600	France	2,600 km, +36,000 m	8d 07h 19m	1st (unsupported solo)	8th
2020	BikingMan Corsica	France	850 km, +15 000 m	2d 11h 8min	1st	4th
2021	B-Hard Ultra Race	Bosnia	1 200 km, +15 000 m	2d 10h 9min	1st	2nd
2021	BikingMan Euskadi	Pyrenees	1 000 km, +23 000 m	3d 8h 13min	1st	7th
2021	Wish One Gravel Race Aubrac	France	170 km	-	1st	–
2022	24 h du Mans vélo	France	837 km	24h	1st	4th
2022	Ultr'Arverne	France	780 km, +15 000 m	-	1st	2nd
2022	Trans Balkan Race	Balkan	1 300 km, +27 000 m	7d 14h 55min	2nd	16th
2022	Haute Route Davos	Switzerland	265 km, +6750 m (3 stages)	7h 19min	2nd	43rd
2023	Silk Road Mountain Race	Kyrgyzstan	1 880 km, +27 700 m	8d 16h 18min	1st (woman tie)	14th
2023	Tarifa → North Cape	Europe	6 300 km	18d 15h 27min	women's WR	–
2024	Atlas Mountain Race	Morocco	1 337 km, +21 140 m	5d 0h 2min	2nd	22nd
2024	Ultr’Arverne	France	778 km, +14 500 m	-	1st	5th
2024	Badlands	Spain	760 km, +15 000 m	2d 12h 19min	4th	20th
2024	Canyon Gravel Roc	France	69,6 km, +1 660 m	3h 09min 13s	3rd	–
2025	Tour Divide	USA	4 353 km, +33 296 m	16d 10h 17min	1st	21st
2025	Les Géants Gravel	France	400 km, +10 500 m	1d 4h 07min	1st	1st
