= Trans Am Bike Race =

Annual cycling event in the United States

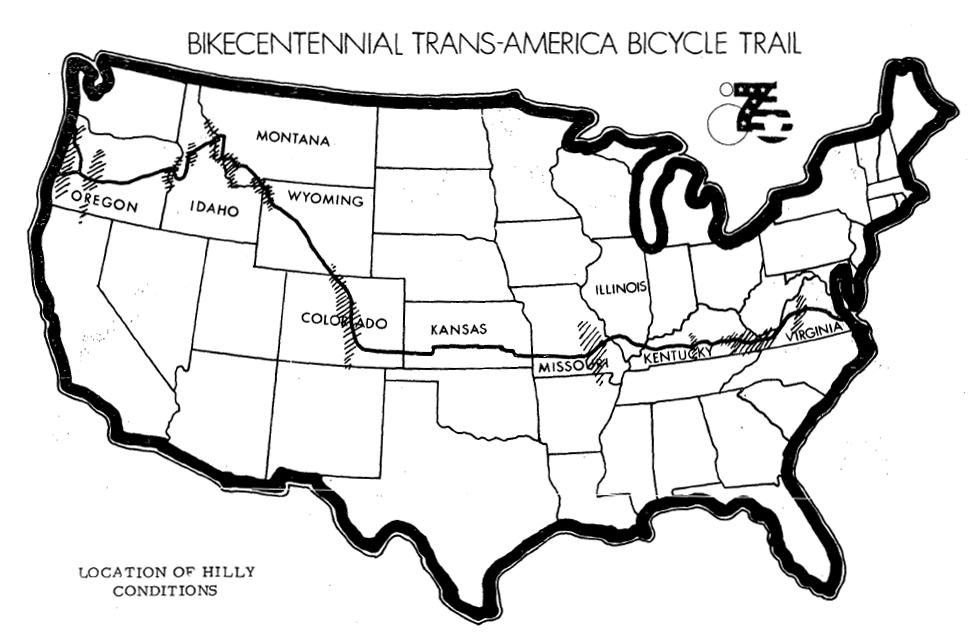
Bikecentennial Route

The Trans Am Bike Race (TABR) is an annual, self-supported, ultra-distance cycling race across the United States. The route is about 4,200 miles (6,800 km) long and uses the TransAmerica Bicycle Trail that was developed by the Adventure Cycling Association for the Bikecentennial event in 1976. The route runs from the Pacific coast in Astoria, Oregon to the Atlantic coast in Yorktown, Virginia, passing through ten states. The inaugural race was in 2014, which 25 people completed, the fastest of whom took less than 18 days.

It is not a stage race; the clock never stops from the moment the riders leave the start to the moment that they reach the finish, so it is a long individual time trial. Riders must therefore strategically choose how much time to devote to riding, resting, and refueling each day. Being self-supported or unsupported means that drafting is not allowed, receiving any form of support from other racers, friends, or family is not allowed; all food, accommodation, repairs, etc., must be purchased from commercial sources.

== Organization and following the race ==
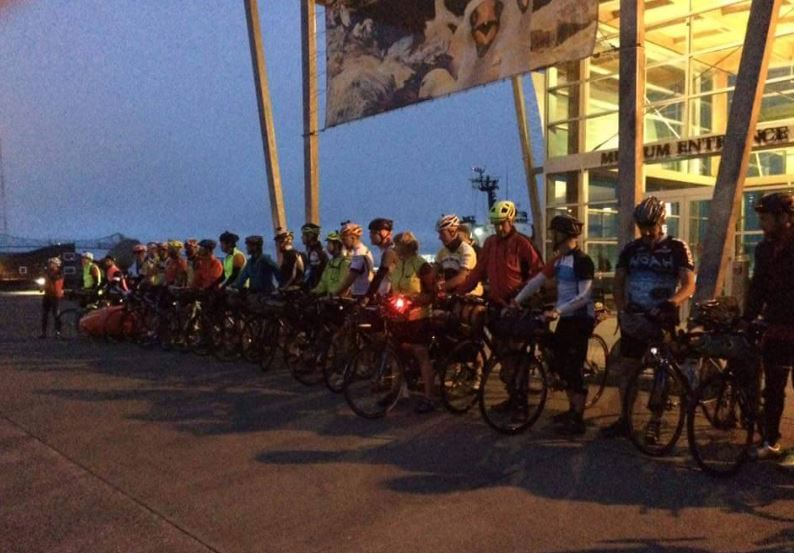
Trans Am Bike Race 2015 start

The race's founder and main organizer is Nathan Jones, who also participated in the 2014 event, finishing in 13th place, and rode the Tour Divide mountain bike race in 2010 and 2011.

Rider positions are monitored using GPS satellite-based tracker devices mounted on participants' bikes that upload their positions to the Trackleaders website for the participants and followers to view. Many participants also update followers on their progress using social media websites.

A feature-length documentary, called Inspired to Ride was made about the inaugural edition, in 2014. The focus of the film was on the male and female winners, Mike Hall and Juliana Buhring, but many of the other racers were also featured, including the actor Brian Steele. The film was made by many of the same people who were involved in the Ride The Divide movie about the similar Tour Divide mountain bike race, including Mike Dion and Hunter Weeks.

== Rules and results ==
Rules are listed on the official website. The idea of self-supported or unsupported bicycle racing is a key component, and any type of bicycle is allowed, including recumbent bicycles.

The main results are summarized in the table below. It is notable that only two women had completed the race, both in 2014, before Lael Wilcox won the 2016 edition with a come from behind finish to overtake the long-standing leader, Steffen Streich in the final day. In 2016, there was a new pairs category and participants were able to ride the route in either direction (west to east or east to west).

The current record is held by Abdullah Zeinab, who completed the 2019 race in 16 days, 9 hours, 56 minutes.

Year	Starters	Finishers	1st (time)	2nd	3rd	1st female (time)
2014 (Eastbound)	45	25	Mike Hall (United Kingdom) (17d 16h 17m)	Jason Lane (Canada) (18d 12h 30m)	Edward Pickup (United Kingdom) (19d 15h 10m)	Juliana Buhring (United Kingdom) / (Germany) (20d 23h 46m) (4th total)
2015 (Eastbound)	41	24	Jesse Carlsson (Australia) (18d 23h 08m)	Evan Deutsch (United States) & Kim Raeymaekers (Belgium) (20d 10h 20m) (equal 2nd)		none finished
2016 Eastbound	58	45	Lael Wilcox (United States) (18d 0h 10m)	Steffen Streich (Greece) (18d 2h 18m)	Evan Deutsch (United States) (18d 7h 44m)	Lael Wilcox (United States) (18d 0h 10m) (1st total)
2016 Westbound	8	6	Jason Marshall (United States) (26d 15h 03m)	Thomas Lambolais (France)	Terry Roe & Ken Simpson (pair) (United States)	Adi Coventry-Brown (New Zealand) (37d 11h 31m)
2017 (Eastbound)	132	62	Evan Deutsch (United States) (17d 9h 8m)	Jon Lester (United States) (18d 12h )	Janie Hayes (United States) (19d 07h 41m)	Janie Hayes (United States) (3rd total)
2018 (Eastbound)	124	44	Peter Andersen (United States) (16d 20h 41m)	Indiana Schulz (United States) (17d 15h 25m)	Kraig Pauli (United States) (18d 14h 46m)	Tanja Hacker (Austria) (22d 20h 8m)
2018 (Velomobile)	2	2	Marcel Graber (Switzerland) (16d 6h 40m)	Dave Lewis (United States) (17d 20h 33m)	n/a	n/a
2019 (Eastbound)	74	46	Abdullah Zeinab (Australia) (16d 9h 56m)	Keith Morical (United States) (19d 11h 53m)	Omar Di Felice (Italy) /Jani Simula (Norway) (20d 09h 06m - Tie)	Lea Meszarosova (United Kingdom) (21d 10h 04m)
2021 (Eastbound)	42	19	Kraig Pauli (United States) (17d 8h 30m)	Evan Deutsch (United States) (18d 15h 00m)	David Tschan (Switzerland) (19d 14h 46m)	Brooke Barney (United States) (30d 11h 55m)
2022 (Eastbound)	46	27	Kraig Pauli (United States) (17d 9h 01m)	Ben Davies (18d 3h 53m)	Edward Tapp (18d 14h 40m)	De'anna Caligiruri (35d 00h 12m)
2023 (Eastbound)	46	25	Omar Di Felice (Italy) (18d 10h 13m)	Pawel Pulawski (Poland) (18d 14h 30m)	Henri Do (Canada) (19d 08h 55m)	Abby Moore (United States) (29d 20h 53m)

== Similar races ==
This form of ultra-distance, unsupported bike racing first became popular with the Tour Divide mountain bike race, which was first held as a mass-start event in 2008. The Tour Divide starts in Alberta, Canada, follows the Great Divide Mountain Bike Route through the US and finishes at the Mexican border in New Mexico. The Transcontinental Race started in 2013 and is the event that is most similar to the Trans Am Bike Race because it is on paved roads; however, that route varies every year with different start and finish locations being used and riders must choose their own route while visiting certain checkpoints. Similarly the Indian Pacific Wheel Race (IndyPac) was first held in 2017, racing across Australia, from the Freemantle Lighthouse, Perth, to the Opera House, Sydney. The Race to the Rock has been held in Australia, from Adelaide to Uluru since 2016. The first three editions have all been won by Sarah Hammond.

Another similar ride in the self-supported ultra-distance cycling category is the TransAtlanticWay (TAW). First held in 2016, the route runs from Derry to Cork and follows the scenic west Atlantic coast of Ireland. In 2018 the TAW became a ‘ride’ rather than a race after the death of ultra-cycling legend Mike Hall in 2017, differing it slightly from other self-supported races. It attracts competitive and casual cyclists alike, with its most recent fixture in 2023 being won by Donnacha Cassidy.

The BikingMan race series, bring athletes across the Andes Cordillera of Peru with IncaDivide race, in the Hajar mountains of Oman with BikingMan Oman and around Corsica. BikingMan races are self-supported but every athlete gets a survival map of a recommended route and can rest at the base camps of the checkpoints.

The self-supported nature of the TABR makes it very different from supported ultra-distance events like the Race Across America (RAAM), in which each racer has a large support crew with multiple vehicles. All such support is prohibited in the TABR and similar races that are described as self-supported or unsupported. Ultra-distance audax and randonneuring cycling events are somewhat similar except that drafting is allowed in those and the organizers often provide support at the control points.
