= Axel Carion =

French explorer

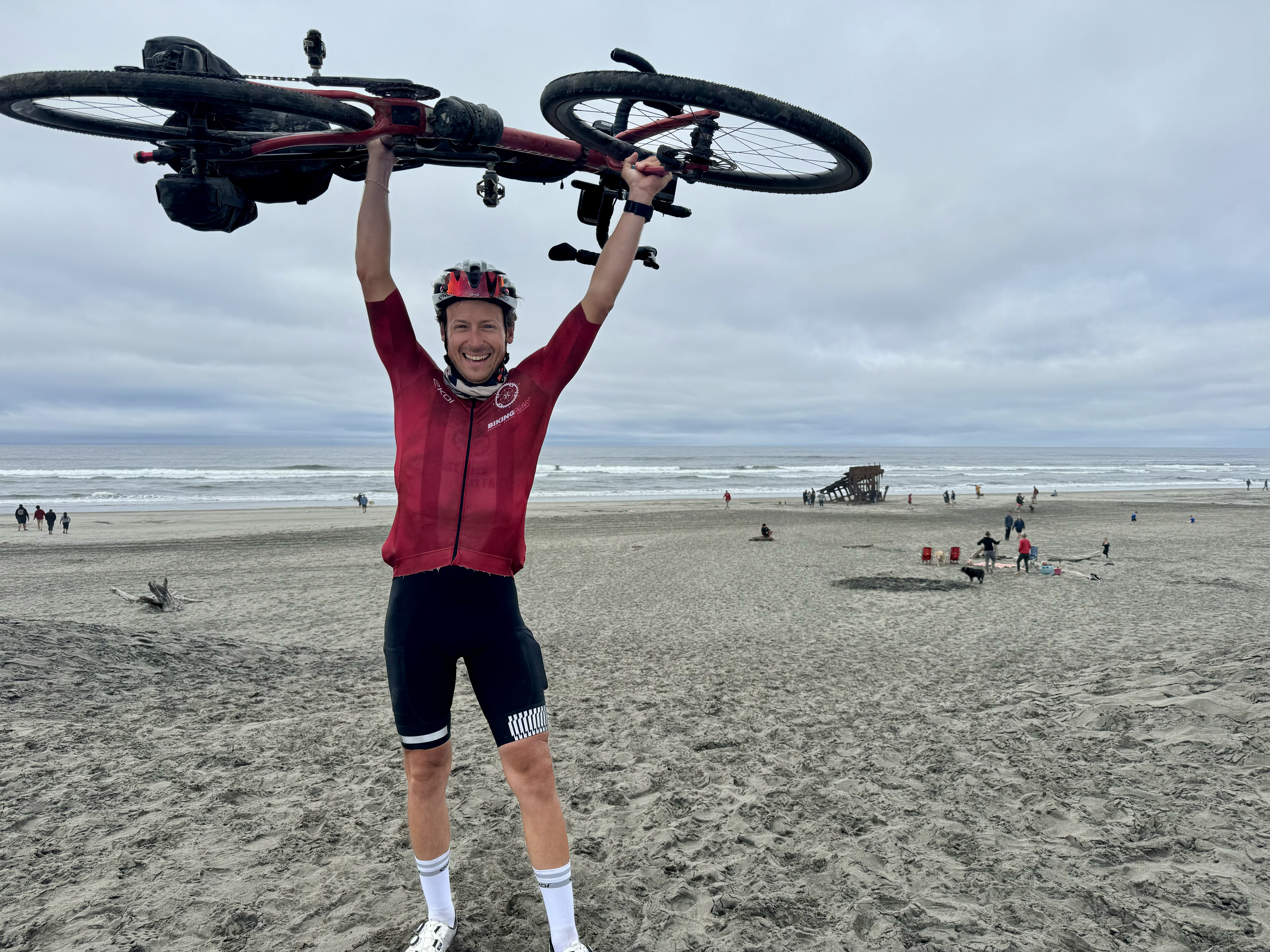
Axel Carion, Astoria (USA)

Axel Carion (Axel, Michael, Jacques), born July 26, 1985, in Chartres (France) is a French explorer, specializing in extreme ultra distance cycling and the organization of ultra cycling self-supported races. He has cycled twice the length of South America in 2015 and 2017 and owns the Guinness World Record for cycling, as a team, the length of South America, established in February 2017.

He is the founder of the BikingMan bikepacking World Series and ambassador of the French Riviera since 2020.

== Guinness World Record - 2017 ==
On January 1, accompanied with the Swede Andreas Fabricius, he attempted to settle the fastest cycle crossing of South America from Cartagena - Colombia to Ushuaia - Argentina. After 49 days, 23 hours and 43 minutes, the duo managed to reach Ushuaia in Tierra del Fuego. Self-supported, they had to manage food, accommodations, bike repairs and some remote sections of more than 100 km without a single village.

The highlight of the route was the Paso de Jama border crossing between Chile and Argentina where the athletes had to cycle at high altitude (4.800 above sea level) in the Atacama region.

== Human adventure award - 2017 ==
The team duo's expedition in South America, is listed for the 2017 VSD Human Adventure Award along with the explorers Mike Horn, Thomas Coville, Christian Clot, Philippe Croizon and the astronaut Thomas Pesquet.

== Uturuncu expedition, Uturuncu Volcano Climbing in Bolivia - 2018 ==
Axel is passionate about high-altitude cycling. In August 2018, he successfully attempted to reach the summit of one of the highest roads in the world: the Uturuncu Volcano at 5,800 meters.

== Expedition "Chaskis", in the footsteps of Inca runners - 2019 ==
In July 2019, Axel Carion accompanied by the German record holder Jonas Deichmann, managed to cycle the 1,900 kilometers of tracks between the Inca Valley and the Sierra Blanca in Peru. They perform the feat of crossing one of the highest road segment of Peru's "Qhapaq ñan" (network of Inca trails), nicknamed the "Peruvian Great Divide" in reference to the mountain range that crosses the United States from North to South (Continental Divide).

Their course was composed of 35 passes above 4,000 meters of altitude including 3 passes higher than the Mont Blanc. They linked the city of Cusco (capital of the eponymous region) to the village of Conococha which sits at the foot of the white mountain range, in 16 days.

They completed this feat in tribute to the Peruvian "Chaskis" runners, who traveled very long on foot to convey messages from the capital Cuzco to the borders of the Inca empire. This course is extremely demanding due to the prevailing climatic conditions (from +40 °C to −15 °C), the conditions of the rocky and muddy Andean tracks and the limited access to food for refueling.

== World record on the Jordan Bike Trail - 2020 ==
In February 2020, Axel Carion invited the German record holder Jonas Deichmann, to cycle the Jordan Bike Trail in record time. Starting in Um Qais (Northern Jordan), the JBT follows the ancient trade road and link the Sea of Galilee, the Dead sea and the Red sea and finished in Aqaba (Southern Jordan). It is 730 kilometers long, with 20,000m of ascent over 57 climbs. The two explorers completed this expedition in 120 hours battling freezing temperatures, snow, strong wind and extreme elevation of the trail. The fastest time before their successful attempt had been completed in 10 days.

== Fastest Known Time on the GT20 in Corsica - 2020 ==
In September 2020, Axel Carion accompanied by ultra-distance BikingMan athletes Anthony Duriani, Xavier Massart, Romain Level and Fabian Burri set the first fastest known time for crossing the Island of Beauty by following the route approved by the Corsica Tourism Agency : GT20. This course connects Bastia to Bonifacio via Cap Corse, the Agriates Desert, Balagne and the Regional Natural Park. After 592 kilometers and 11,000m of vertical gain, Axel and his team reached Bonifacio in 35h32min of cycling non stop without assistance and two full nights spent without sleeping.

== Main cycling expeditions ==
- 2011: Crossing the Carpathian Mountains (1,200 km) in Central Europe
- 2012: Crossing Central Europe (1,500 km)
- 2013: Crossing the Atlas and Anti-Atlas (1,500 km) in Morocco
- 2013: Crossing France from Mulhouse to Nice (1,000 km)
- 2015: Continental crossing of South America in 185 days (13,500 km)
- 2017: World record for crossing South America in 50 days (11,000 km)
- 2018: Ascent of Uturuncu volcano in Bolivia (5,800 m)
- 2019: World record for crossing the Peruvian Qhapaq ñan (royal inca trail) in 16 days
- 2020: World record for crossing the Jordan Bike Trail in 120 hours (730km, 20,000m of ascent)
- 2020: Fastest Known Time for crossing the GT20 in Corsica - 35h32min (592km, 11,000m of ascent)
- 2021: Tour de France (3,100 km)
- 2022: Crossing the Ho-Chi-Minh trail (2,700 km) in Laos and Vietnam
- 2024: Crossing the USA (5,800 km) in 25 days
