= Westfjords Way Challenge =

Ultra-distance cycling race in Iceland

Race details
- Region: Westfjords, Iceland
- Nickname(s): WWC
- Type: Endurance Cycling Event
- Organiser: Cycling Westfjords

History
- First edition: 2022
- Editions: 2 (as of 2023)
- First winner: Lael Wilcox (USA); Arnþór Gústavsson (ISL)

Westfjords Way Challenge is a five-day ultra-distance cycling stage race around the Westfjords of Iceland. It totals 954 km and each stage ranges from 211 to 255 km. The start and finish point are in Ísafjörður. The inaugural race was held in June 2022 and was won by Lael Wilcox and Arnþór Gústavsson. In contrary to the usual stage races, it is not all about racing. Every stage includes "cultural" stops and for all participants it is mandatory to stop at at least two of them for a minimum of 20 minutes. The time is neutralized during the visit and therefore does not count for the overall time. This is for connecting the participants with the country and landscape they are racing in. The stops can be a museum, a hot pot or a farm etc.

== Stages ==
=== Stage 1 ===
- Ísafjörður - Drangsnes - 254 km

=== Stage 2 ===
- Drangsnes - Fellströnd - 243 km

=== Stage 3 ===
- Fellströnd - Patreksfjörður - 246 km

=== Stage 4 ===
- Patreksfjörður - Ísafjörður - 211 km

== Winners ==
Year	Female winner	Female winner's time	Male winner	Male winner's time
2022	Lael Wilcox	40 hours 43 mins 42 sec	Arnþór Gústavsson	35 hours 56 mins 57 sec
2023	Weronika Szalas	44 hours 30 mins 47 sec	Arnþór Gústavsson	36 hours 57 mins 31 sec
2024	Hafdís Sigurðardóttir	38 klukkustundir 10 mínútur 49 sekúndur	Marian Broeker	36 klukkustundir 23 mínútur 25 sekúndur
