= Strada dell'Assietta =

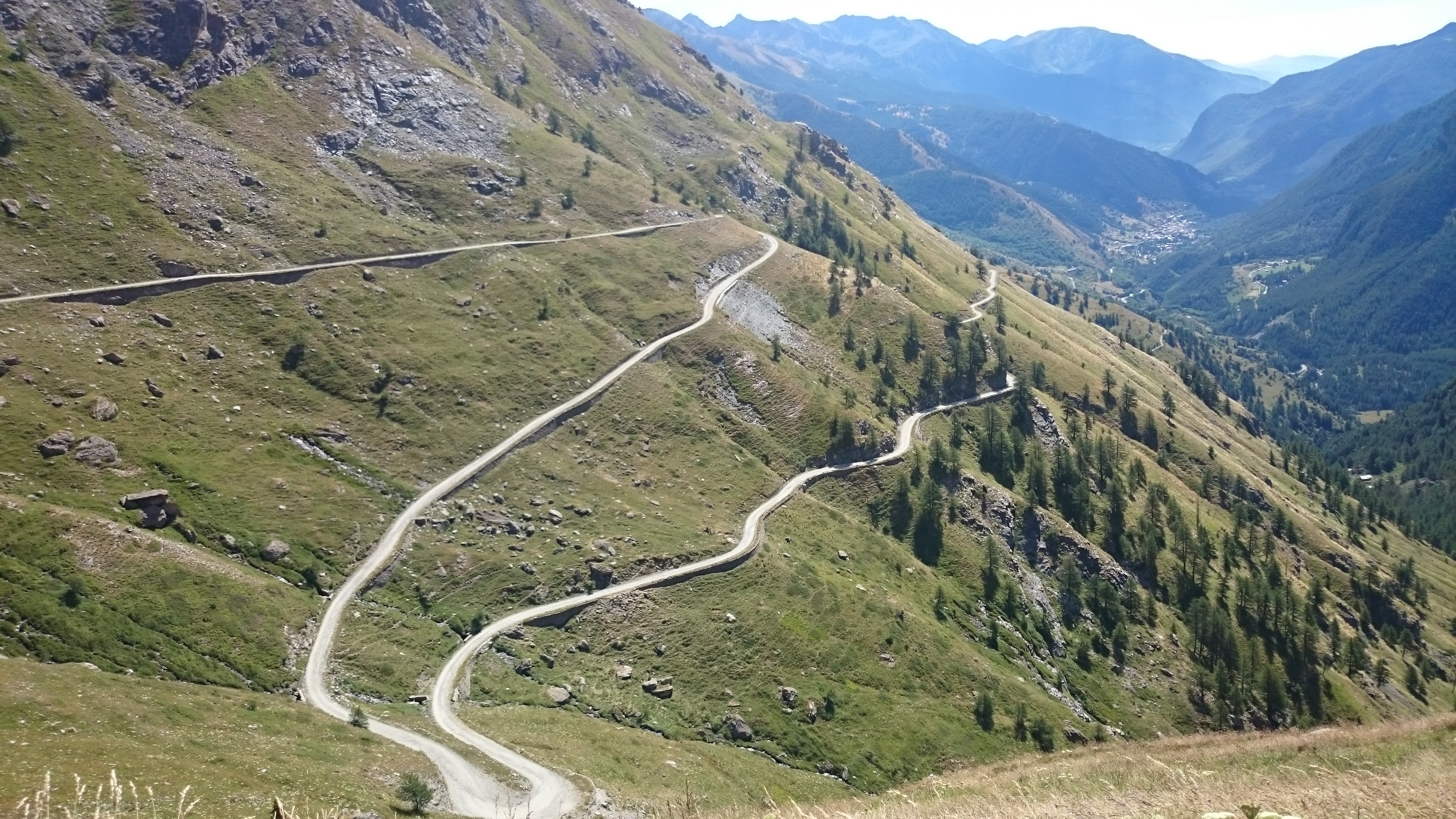
Strada dell'Assietta

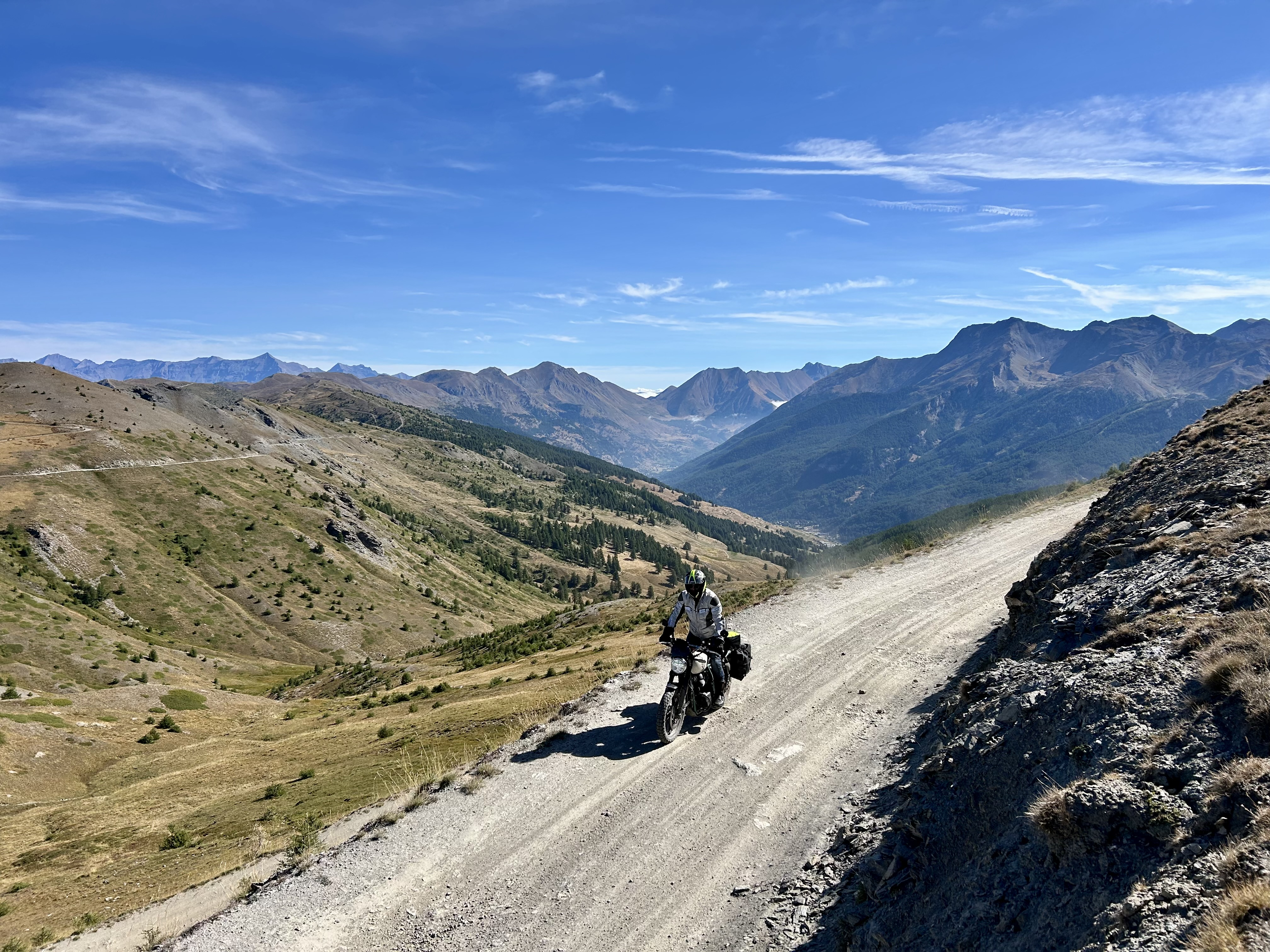
Strada Militare del Colle dell'Assietta

The Strada dell'Assietta, also known as Strada Provinciale (SP) 173 del Colle dell'Assietta, is a 34 km-long dirt road between Sestriere and the SP 172 at Pian dell'Alpe, near the Colle delle Finestre.

The road is almost entirely above 2000 metres altitude and so is only open from June 1 to October 31. It runs along the ridge that separates the Val Chisone and Susa valley and passes several mountain passes between these valleys including Colle dell'Assietta (2,474 m), Colle Blegier (2,381 m), Colle Costa Piana (2,313 m), Colle Bourget (2,299 m) and Col Basset (2,424 m).

The road was built in the late 1800s for military purposes, and the ruins of forts still remain. Today, some farmers use the road to access their land, but the primary use is by tourists, particularly people on touring motorbikes and mountain bikes. The surface is rough dirt and rock and is generally only wide enough for one vehicle.

The eastern end of the road is very close to the Colle delle Finestre (a road that is also mostly unpaved on the northern side), which has been featured in several professional cycling races, including Stage 20 of the 2015 Giro d'Italia. The Strada dell'Assietta itself hasn't been used in any professional races, but is the focus of the mountain bike race the Tour dell'Assietta, and it was used as the second checkpoint in the 2015 and also included as a parcours in the 2025 Transcontinental Race (a non-stop, unsupported bicycle race across Europe normally done on road bicycles).
