= Lael Wilcox =

American ultra-distance cyclist (born 1986)

Personal information
- Born: July 18, 1986 (age 40) Anchorage, Alaska, US
- Education: University of Puget Sound
- Occupation: Sport cyclist
- Spouse: Rugile "Rue" Kaladyte
- Website: www.laelwilcox.net

Sport
- Country: United States
- Sport: Sport cycling

Lael Wilcox (born July 18, 1986) is an ultra-endurance bicycle racer who won the Trans Am Bike Race in 2016, and set Tour Divide's women's course record on an individual time trial (ITT) in 2015. She was the first American to win the Trans Am. She also set the overall course record with her time on the Baja Divide route.

== Early life and personal life ==
Wilcox was born on July 18, 1986, and grew up in Anchorage, Alaska. She graduated from the University of Puget Sound in 2008 with degrees in natural science and French literature.

Wilcox started bicycling in 2008 at age 20, when she and her then boyfriend, Nicholas Carman, decided to tour the world. Working stints to collect money, the two set out on a bicycle tour of over thirty countries. They started in North America, then traveled in Eastern Europe, the Middle East, and Africa, logging over 100,000 miles (160,000 km).

Wilcox and Carman separated in 2017. In May 2021, Wilcox married Rugile "Rue" Kaladyte, a photojournalist who has documented many of Wilcox's rides.

== Initiatives and sponsorships ==
In the 2015–2016 winter and spring, Wilcox and Carman co-developed the off-pavement bikepacking Baja Divide route, which runs from San Diego, California through San Jose del Cabo and on to La Paz, Baja California Sur, Mexico.

As of 2016, Wilcox and Carman, along with Wilcox's mother, Dawn Wilcox, taught biking skills and repaired bicycles for elementary school children in Anchorage. They also ran a program to collect bikes to donate to schoolchildren. As of 2018-2019, Lael co-leads Anchorage GRIT to get more local girls on bikes, and talks about it and other programs. In 2018 Wilcox began the Lael Rides Alaska Women's Scholarship.

As of 2018 through 2020, Wilcox has general sponsorships from Specialized and Revelate Designs.

== Racing ==
Wilcox first became interested in racing in 2014 when she and Carman were in Israel. The pair heard about and entered the Holyland Challenge, a 1000-mile unsupported race across the country. She was both the youngest rider and the only woman. She led the race by 25 miles the first day, and although she did not win the race, she was firmly focused on endurance racing.

=== Trans Am ===
In 2016, Wilcox participated in the 4,400-mile (7,100 km) Trans Am Bike Race that crosses the United States from west to east. As a small woman dressed in non-cycling clothes and with very little road-racing experience, she was not expected to compete, much less win. She averaged 235 miles per day for 18 days, averaging less than 5 hours of sleep per night. On the final morning, she trailed Steffen Streich by 40 miles. That morning, Streich awoke and mistakenly started riding west. Wilcox met Streich in Bumpass, Virginia. Streich suggested they ride to the finish together, and Wilcox responded, "[t]his is a race," and sprinted the final 130 miles (210 km) to the coast to become the first woman and the first American to win the race. Wilcox sprinted the final hours to win the race in 18 days and ten minutes.

=== Tour Divide ===
In 2015, Wilcox, still considered relatively inexperienced at road racing, broke the women's record on the Tour Divide by more than two days. She covered the 2,745-mile (4,418 km) race in 15 days, 10 hour and 59 minutes in an individual time trial.

=== Baja Divide ===
In 2015, Wilcox set the women's record for the fastest time on the Baja Divide route. In 2017, she broke the men's record as well.

=== Navad 1000 ===
In 2018, Wilcox became only the second female to complete Switzerland's Navad 1000 bikepacking race, finishing in second place. The race features 627 miles distance and 99,770 feet of climbing. Lael's race was commemorated in the film I'm Not Stopping produced by Rugile Kaladyte.

=== Westfjords Way Challenge ===
In June 2022, Wilcox became the inaugural winner of the Westfjords Way Challenge.

=== Round the world ===
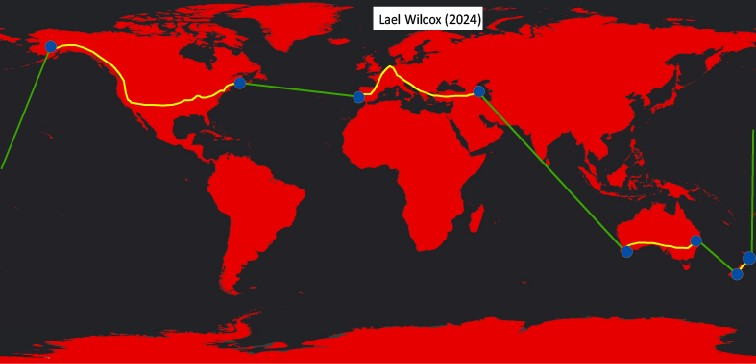
Route followed by Lael Wilcox when circumnavigating the world by bike in 2024.

On 26 May 2024, Wilcox started an 18,020-mile (29,000 km) journey round the world, starting in Chicago, which she intended to complete in about 110 days. She finished on September 11, 2024, having taken 108 days, 12 hours and 12 minutes to cycle 18,125 miles, beating Jenny Graham's record by more than a fortnight.

=== Lael Rides Around the World Faster ===
Having set the women's world record in 2024 by riding 18,125 miles with 630,000 feet of climbing in 108 days, 12 hours and 12 minutes, Wilcox began a second circumnavigation attempt on 7 June 2026, targeting the overall record held by Mark Beaumont of 78 days, 14 hours and 40 minutes.

Unlike her 2024 ride — an unsupported effort on a mountainous route averaging around 15 mph for 12 hours per day — the 2026 attempt employs a support crew to manage food, accommodation, and logistics along a flatter route. In preparation, Wilcox spent time in the wind tunnel at Specialized's headquarters in Morgan Hill, California, and shaved her head to reduce aerodynamic drag.

Wilcox departed from Buckingham Fountain in Chicago, Illinois, at 4:00 a.m. on 7 June 2026, with a target finish of no later than 6:40 p.m. on 24 August 2026, passing through the United States, Canada, Portugal, Spain, France, Belgium, the Netherlands, Germany, Poland, Slovakia, Hungary, Romania, Bulgaria, Turkey, Kazakhstan, Thailand, Malaysia, Singapore, Australia, and New Zealand before returning to Chicago. She planned to average 231 miles (372 km) per day, targeting approximately 240 miles (386 km) on each riding day to account for transfers. Wilcox's wife, Rugile Kaladyte, is again documenting the attempt through photography and video for a feature-length film.

Wilcox abandoned her attempt 14 days into her attempt, on June 21 2026, due to the extreme heat in Europe.
