= BikingMan =

French-based ultra distance cycling event organizer

Race details
- Date: April (Corsica) / May (Brazil, France) / June (France) / September (France) / October (France) / Nov-Dec (Oman)
- Region: Asia (Laos, Taiwan) / Europe (Corsica, France, Portugal) / Middle-East (Oman) / South American (Brazil, Peru)
- Discipline: ultra distance cycling
- Competition: BikingMan Race Series
- Type: Multi-day self-supported unstaged races
- Organiser: BikingMan
- Race director: Axel Carion

History
- First edition: July 1, 2017
- Editions: 14 (as of December 2020)
- First winner: Rodney Soncco (PER) - IncaDivide 2017
- Most wins: Rodney Soncco (PER) - 6 wins
- Most recent: Anthony Duriani (FRA) - BikingMan Corsica 2020

BikingMan is a French-based organization that organises unstaged, self-supported, ultra distance cycling events, in South America, Europe, the Middle East and Asia. It was founded in 2016 by Axel Carion, who came back from cycling across South America in 2015 and wanted to share the experience of cycling unknown places in survival conditions for endurance athletes.

== Self-supported ultra cycling ==
The self-supported nature of the BikingMan races makes it different from supported ultra-distance events like the Race Across America (RAAM), in which each racer has a large support crew with multiple vehicles and where pure performance cycling is needed to finish these races. The carbon footprint of the races are kept to a minimum, support cars outside BikingMan organizations media cars, are strictly forbidden.

Being self-supported means that drafting is not allowed, receiving any form of support from other racers, friends, or family is not allowed; all food, accommodation, repairs, etc., must be purchased from commercial sources if they can find any on the road. The organizer provides a mandatory route, a GPS tracker to monitor each participant's progress and prevent cheating, as well as a road book. Riders must strategically choose how much time to devote to riding, resting, and refueling each day.

It is not a stage race, the clock never stops from the moment the riders leave the start to the moment that they reach the finish. Orienteering plays a major role as most of the races' locations are unknown to most participants.

== Rules of BikingMan races ==
The complete rule set is available in the race manual of every race.

1. Athletes are self-supported and need to handle their fueling, repairs and rest during the race
2. All athletes must ride from the start location to the finish location while crossing the mandatory checkpoints in the right order
3. Every athlete needs to stamp her/his progression at every staffed checkpoint in the opening time windows
4. Drafting and riding as a pack are forbidden
5. Every athlete needs to carry a GPS tracking system to trace her/his progression
6. External assistance of any kind is forbidden
7. No support cars are allowed
8. SOLO or pair riders can attempt the races

== How to follow the race ==
BikingMan events are all covered by a limited number of media cars from the organization. The events are therefore presented live on social networks, namely the Instagram and Facebook accounts of the organization. During races, and on a daily basis, a story-based article is published on the Exposure page of the organization, as well as an additional article for the leaderboard once the race is completed. All participants are equipped with a GPS tracker, which allows to share their position on a live-tracking website.

== Season 2017 ==
In 2017 was held the first BikingMan event; the IncaDivide race, which took 17 athletes in the Andes mountains of Ecuador and Peru. A brutal race where the main challenge for every racer was to battled against high altitude cycling conditions of the Andes.

=== Calendar of the races ===
Race Name	Start location	Finish location	Dates	Distance (km)	Total elevation gain (m)	Mandatory Checkpoints	Time limit
IncaDivide 2017	Quito (Ecuador)	Cuzco (Peru)	July 1, 2017	3500	63000	4	25 days 600 hours

=== Results ===
Race Name	Starters	Finishers	1st Female	1st Male	1st Pair
IncaDivide 2017	17	6	Yoshie Yabu (Japan) in 24d7h	Rodney Soncco (Peru) in 16d21h	N/A

== Season 2018 ==
In 2018, BikingMan introduced the 1st ultra cycling championship which gathered athletes from around the globe to race the Hajar mountains of Oman, across the Andes Cordillera of Peru with IncaDivide race, around Corsica and in Taiwan.

On the "Sprint" BikingMan 2018 races (Oman and Corsica), base camps were built at the checkpoints where athletes could rest. Compulsory stops at staffed checkpoints ensure athletes timestamp their progression, validate their physical state and eventually scratch the athletes who don't respect the closing times of every checkpoint.

=== Calendar of the races ===
Race Name	Format	Start location	Finish location	Dates	Distance (km)	Total elevation gain (m)	Mandatory Checkpoints	Time limit
BikingMan Oman 2018	Sprint	Barka city (Oman)	Old Muscat (Oman)	February 25, 2018	1050	7500	3	5 days 120 hours
BikingMan Corsica 2018	Sprint	Bastia (Corsica) (France)	Bastia (Corsica) (France)	April 29, 2018	700	13000	3	5 days 120 hours
IncaDivide 2018	Divide	Trujillo (Peru)	Trujillo (Peru)	July 1, 2018	1800	31000	4	12 days 288 hours
BikingMan Taiwan 2018	Sprint	Taipei (Taiwan)	Taipei (Taiwan)	October 22, 2018	1150	18000	3	5 days 120 hours

=== Results ===
Race Name	Starters	Finishers	1st Female	1st Male	1st Pair
BikingMan Oman 2018	44	34	Juliana Buhring (Germany) in 49h53min	Rodney Soncco (Peru) in 46h17min	Oman Cycling (Mohamed Al Chandoubi/Hatem Al Booshri) (Oman) in 71h30min
BikingMan Corsica 2018	83	59	Ivana Furlan (Italy) in 40h24min	Mikael Flockhart (Sweden) in 29h35min	Antony Duriani / Loic Leonardi Giacometti (Corsica) (France) in 45h41min
IncaDivide 2018	35	22	N/A	Rodney Soncco (Peru) in 127h22min	Yanis Hernandez / Eddy Marquez (Venezuela) in 221h34min
BikingMan Taiwan 2018	28	23	Perrine Fages (France) in 119h32min	Rodney Soncco (Peru) in 57h58min	Romain Level / Simon Noel (France) in 81h30min

==== 2018 Championship ranking ====
Participants enter the season ranking once they have completed, as finishers, 2 BikingMan series races.

Position	Female Rider	Male Rider	Pair Riders
1st	Perrine Fages (France)	Rodney Soncco (Peru)	Mohamed Al Chandoubi / Hatem Al Booshri (Oman)
2nd	N/A	Niel Copeland (UK) (United Kingdom)	Reinhard Mink / Anne Wursthorn (Germany)
3rd	N/A	Michelangelo Pacifico (Italy)	N/A
4th	N/A	Robbie Ferri (UK) (United Kingdom)	N/A
5th	N/A	Marcus Leach (UK) (United Kingdom)	N/A
6th	N/A	Marco Beligni (Italy)	N/A
7th	N/A	Marcel Esser (Netherlands)	N/A
8th	N/A	Rodrigue Lombard (France)	N/A
9th	N/A	Xavier Massart (Belgium)	N/A
10th	N/A	Fabian Burri (Switzerland)	N/A

== Season 2019 ==
The 2019 season introduced 2 new events: Laos in May, and Portugal in September, bringing the series to a total of 6 events, all parts of the 2019 championship.

=== Calendar of the races ===
Race Name	Format	Start location	Finish location	Dates	Distance (km)	Total elevation gain (m)	Mandatory Checkpoints	Time limit
BikingMan Oman 2019	Sprint	Barka city (Oman)	Old Muscat (Oman)	February 24, 2019	1035	7200	2	5 days 120 hours
BikingMan Corsica 2019	Sprint	Biguglia (Corsica) (France)	Biguglia (Corsica) (France)	April 29, 2019	700	13000	3	5 days 120 hours
BikingMan Laos 2019	Sprint	Luang Prabang (Laos)	Luang Prabang (Laos)	May 20, 2019	780	11000	2	5 days 120 hours
IncaDivide 2019	Divide	Trujillo (Peru)	Trujillo (Peru)	August 14, 2019	1650	23500	3	10 days 240 hours
BikingMan Portugal 2019	Sprint	Faro (Portugal)	Faro (Portugal)	September 23, 2019	950	10000	2	5 days 120 hours
BikingMan Taiwan 2019	Sprint	Taipei (Taiwan)	Taipei (Taiwan)	November 4, 2019	1150	18000	2	5 days 120 hours

=== Results ===
Race Name	Starters	Finishers	1st Female	1st Male	1st Pair
BikingMan Oman 2019	75	69	Jasmijn Muller (Netherlands) in 45h37	Rodney Soncco (Peru) in 38h17min	Cristian Auriemma (Italy) / Jeff Webb (Canada) in 58h59min
BikingMan Corsica 2019	67	61	Helle Bachofen Von Echt Muller (Denmark) in 41h03	Rodney Soncco (Peru) in 30h52min	Hatim Al Booshri & Mohammed Al Shandoudi (Oman) in 40h07min
BikingMan Laos 2019	15	11	N/A	Jason Black (Ireland (Republic of Ireland) ) in 51h52min	Romain Level & Simon Noel (France) in 69h10min
BikingMan Peru / IncaDivide 2019	44	12	N/A	Sofiane Sehili (France) in 135h35min	Victoria De Sa & Bruno Rosa (Brazil) in 210h09min
BikingMan Portugal 2019	75	64	Helle Bachofen Von Echt (Denmark) in 62h40	Romain Wartel (France) in 40h12min	Hatim Al Booshri & Mohammed Al Shandoudi (Oman) in 56h30
BikingMan Taiwan 2019	22	14	Julie Melville (Canada) in 114h41	Bryce Bénat (France) in 71h47min	Cristian Auriemma (Italy) / Jeff Webb (Canada) in 74h16

=== 2019 Series Ranking ===
Final 2019 Rankings after the race in Taiwan - as of November 15, 2019.

Participants enter the season ranking once they have completed, as finishers, 2 BikingMan races

Current Rank	Female Category	Male Category	Pair Category
1st Rank	Helle Bachofen Von Echt (Denmark)	Rodney Sonnco (Peru)	Hatim AL BOOSHRI & Mohammed AL SHANDOUDI (Oman)
2nd Rank	Julie Melville (Canada)	Guillaume Chaumont (Belgium)	Jeff Webb (Canada) & Cristian Auriemma (Italy)
3rd Rank	Eleonora Balbi (Switzerland)	Jonas Deichmann (Germany)	Musaab AL BOOSHRI & Mshari AL KHALILI (Oman)

== Season 2020 ==
The 2020 season will be composed of 6 events with new routes unveiled on Oman, Corsica, Peru and Laos. Brazil will be part of the series for its first time. The crown jewel event incadivide will unveil a course in the sacred valley of the Incas around Cusco city.

=== Impact of the COVID-19 Pandemic ===
Following the global pandemic and many locked-down countries, the race calendar has been modified by the race organisation to adapt to the situation with the races in Brazil, Peru and Laos canceled, while the 2020 edition of BikingMan Corsica, initially scheduled for April 2020, is planned for October 2020. The 2020 series will therefore be composed of 3 events out of the 6 initially planned.

=== Calendar of the races ===
Race Name	Format	Start location	Finish location	Dates	Distance (km)	Total elevation gain (m)	Mandatory Checkpoints	Time limit
BikingMan Oman 2020	Sprint	Muscat (Oman)	Muscat (Oman)	February 22, 2020	1,060	8,700	2	5 days 120 hours
BikingMan Portugal 2020	Sprint	Faro (Portugal)	Faro (Portugal)	September 21, 2020	950	12,000	2	5 days 120 hours
BikingMan Corsica 2020	Sprint	Bigulia (Corsica) (France)	Biguglia (Corsica) (France)	October 26, 2020	850	15,000	2	5 days 120 hours
BikingMan Brazil 2020	Sprint	Taubaté (Brazil)	Taubaté (Brazil)	Canceled	1,000	17,000	2	5 days 120 hours
IncaDivide 2020	Divide	Cusco (Peru)	Cusco (Peru)	Canceled	1,600	38,000	3	14 days 336 hours
BikingMan Laos 2020	Sprint	Luang Prabang (Laos)	Luang Prabang (Laos)	Canceled	920	17,000	2	5 days 120 hours

=== Results ===
Race Name	Starters	Finishers	1st Female	1st Male	1st Pair
BikingMan Oman 2020	80	67	Elizabeth Dunne (Ireland (Republic of Ireland) ) in 70h47	Laurent Boursette (France) in 43h36min	Cristian Auriemma (Italy) / Jeff Webb (Canada) in 53h32min
BikingMan Portugal 2020	66	60	Nadia Chenaoui (France) in 78h07	Laurent Boursette (France) in 37h33min	Cédrick Guerin / Christophe Gouyon (France) in 58h51min
BikingMan Corsica 2020	116	99	Nathalie Baillon (France) in 59h08	Anthony Duriani (France) in 55h15min	Bruno Laval / Julien Merle (France) in 73h38min

== Season 2021 ==
The 2021 season has been announced with 7 events focusing mostly on Europe (4 events in France + Portugal) + Brazil and Oman. Brazil will be part of the series for its first time after the canceled 2020 edition.

=== Calendar of the races ===
Race Name	Format	Start location	Dates	Distance (km)	Total elevation gain (m)	Mandatory Checkpoints	Time limit
BikingMan Corsica 2021	Sprint	Biguglia (Corsica) (France)	April 26, 2021	1,000	18,000	2	5 days 120 hours
BikingMan Brazil 2021	Sprint	Taubaté (Brazil)	May 16, 2021	1,000	17,500	2	5 days 120 hours
BikingMan AURA 2021	Sprint	Valence (France)	May 24, 2021	1,000	19,500	2	5 days 120 hours
BikingMan France 2021	Sprint	Le Cannet (France)	June 21, 2021	1,000	20,000	2	5 days 120 hours
BikingMan Euskadi 2021	Sprint	Bayonne (France)	Sept 6, 2021	1,000	23,000	2	5 days 120 hours
BikingMan Portugal 2021	Sprint	Algarve (Portugal)	Oct 4, 2021	1,000	15,000	2	5 days 120 hours
BikingMan Oman 2021	Sprint	Not Revealed yet (Oman)	Q4 2021	1,000	Not revealed yet	2	5 days 120 hours
