= Fiona Kolbinger =

German cyclist and doctor (born 1995)

Fiona Kolbinger (born 24 May 1995) is a German ultra-endurance cyclist, researcher and medical doctor. She was the winner of the Transcontinental Race in 2019 winning in a time of 10 days 2 hours and 48 minutes with an advance of more than ten hours over the second closest, Ben Davies. She was the first woman to ever win the race, beating a field of over 224 men and 40 women. In recognition of her athletic achievements, she was part of the BBC's 100 women of 2019.

Fiona Kolbinger studied medicine at Heidelberg University and is an alumna of the German Cancer Research Center, where she was a doctoral student in the field of paediatric oncology. Since 2019, she is a general surgery resident and physician-scientist at the department for visceral, thoracic and vascular surgery at the University Hospital Carl Gustav Carus at the Technical University Dresden. In 2023, she moved to Purdue University as a Research Assistant Professor of Biomedical Engineering. Her research focuses on artificial intelligence applications for medical decision support and surgical quality control. In recognition of her scientific work, she was listed on the 2025 Forbes 30 under 30 list.
