= Tunnel Punta Olimpica =

Coordinates: 9°08′20″S 77°30′30″W

Punta Olimpica Tunnel
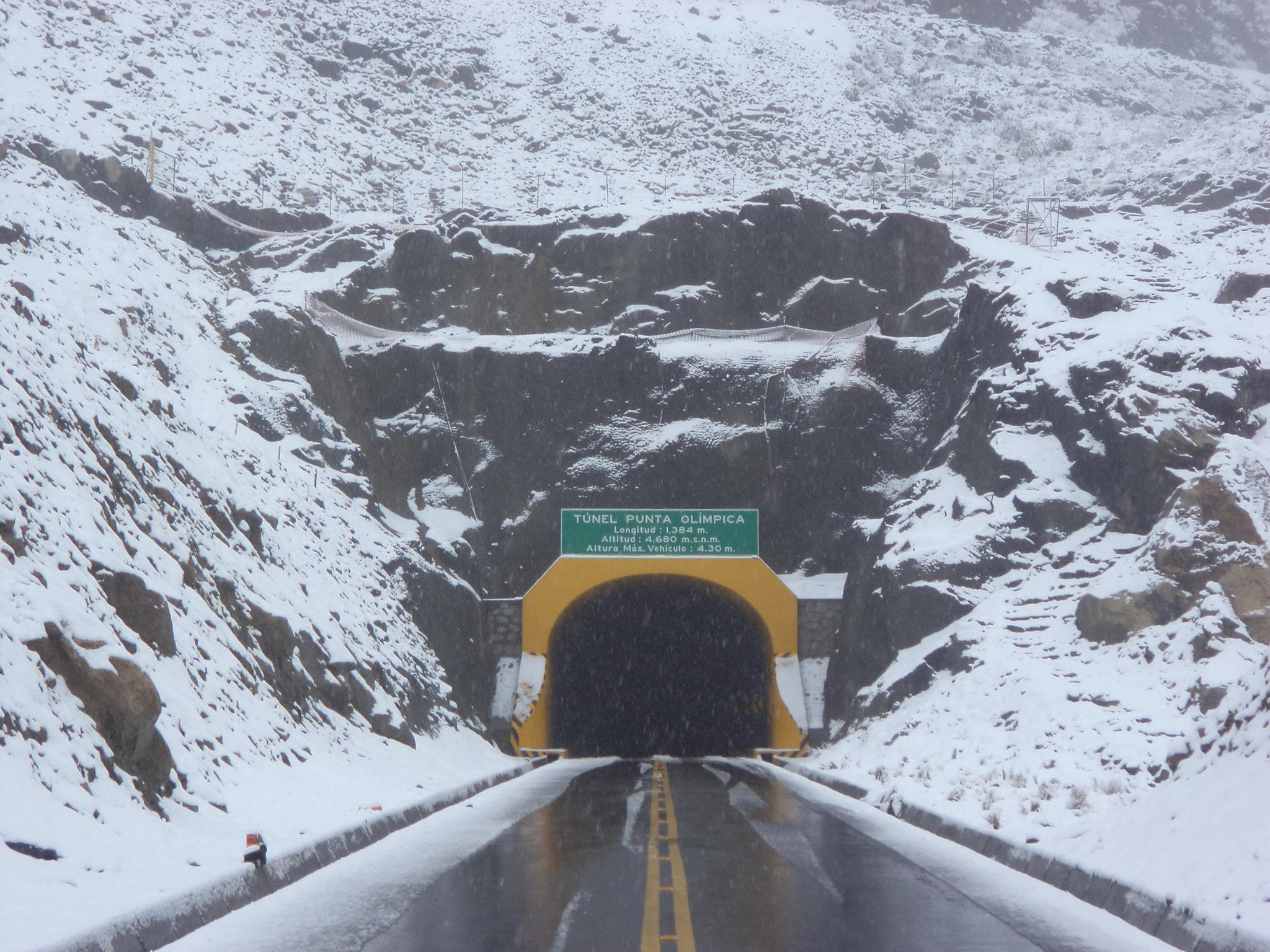
- Chacas side entrance
- Interactive map of Punta Olimpica Tunnel

Overview
- Line: Route AN-107
- Location: Cordillera Blanca, Andes
- Status: operating
- Start: Quebrada Ulta (4732 m)
- End: Lagoon Belaúnde (4680 m)

Operation
- Work began: 15 may 2012
- Constructed: Odebrecht
- Opened: August 2013
- Owner: Gobierno Regional de Áncash
- Operator: Ministerio de Transportes y Comunicaciones
- Traffic: Vehicle

Technical
- Length: 1,384 m (4,541 ft)
- No. of tracks: 1 (two-way)
- Operating speed: up to 40 km/h (25 mph)
- Max elevation: 4,732 m (15,525 ft)
- Min elevation: 4,680 m (15,350 ft)

The Punta Olimpica Tunnel is a vehicular transportation tunnel through high mountains, connecting the Callejón de Huaylas and Conchucos valleys of the Cordillera Blanca mountain range in Peru. The tunnel is intended to ease traffic on Route AN-107, one of the cross roads in the Ancash region linking the cities of Carhuaz, San Luis and Chacas a distance of 100 km. With a length of 1,384 meters (0.860 miles), is the longest vehicular tunnel of Peru and the highest in the world, located at 4,735 meters (15,535 feet) above sea level. Its drilling began on May 15, 2012, and ended on February 24, 2013. It opened in August 2013 in conjunction with Route AN-107.

== Place Name ==
On August 9, 1936, the first shipment of young men responsible for exploring possible routes through the mountains via the road called Punta Olimpica in honor of the memorable feat of the Peruvian Football Team during the 1936 Berlin Olympics where they won 4–2 against Austria.
