= Nevado Pastoruri =

Mountain in Peru

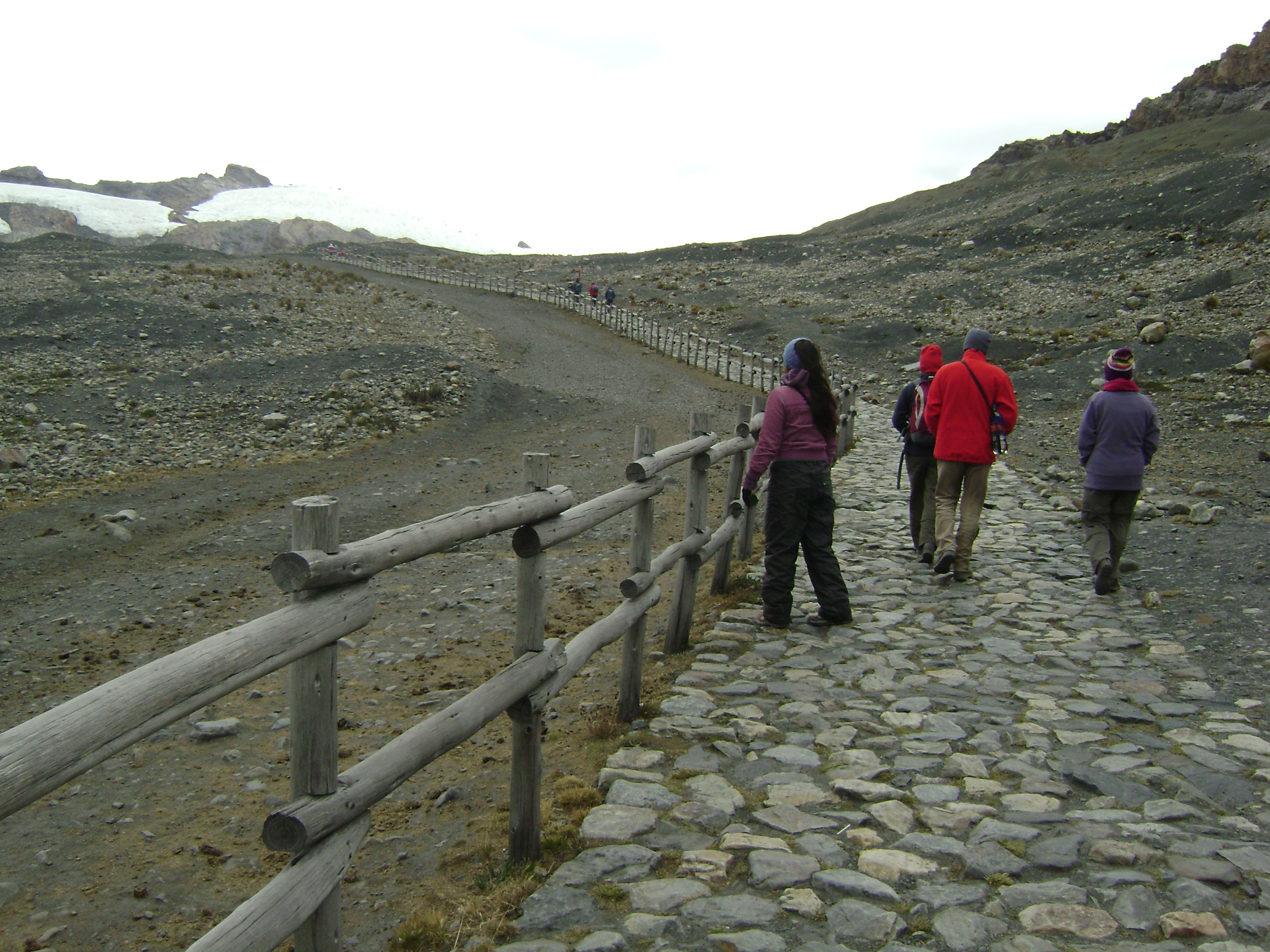

Highest point
- Elevation: 5,240 m (17,190 ft)
- Coordinates: 9°55′45″S 77°11′27″W

Geography
- Location within Peru
- Location: Peru
- Parent range: Andes

Nevado Pastoruri is a mountain in central Peru located in the center of Pachapaqui, in the Aquia District, in the Bolognesi Province in the Ancash Region. It is located in the Cordillera Blanca, a mountainous chain that forms part of the Cordillera Occidental of the Peruvian Andes.
