= Philippe Croizon =

French athlete (born 1968)

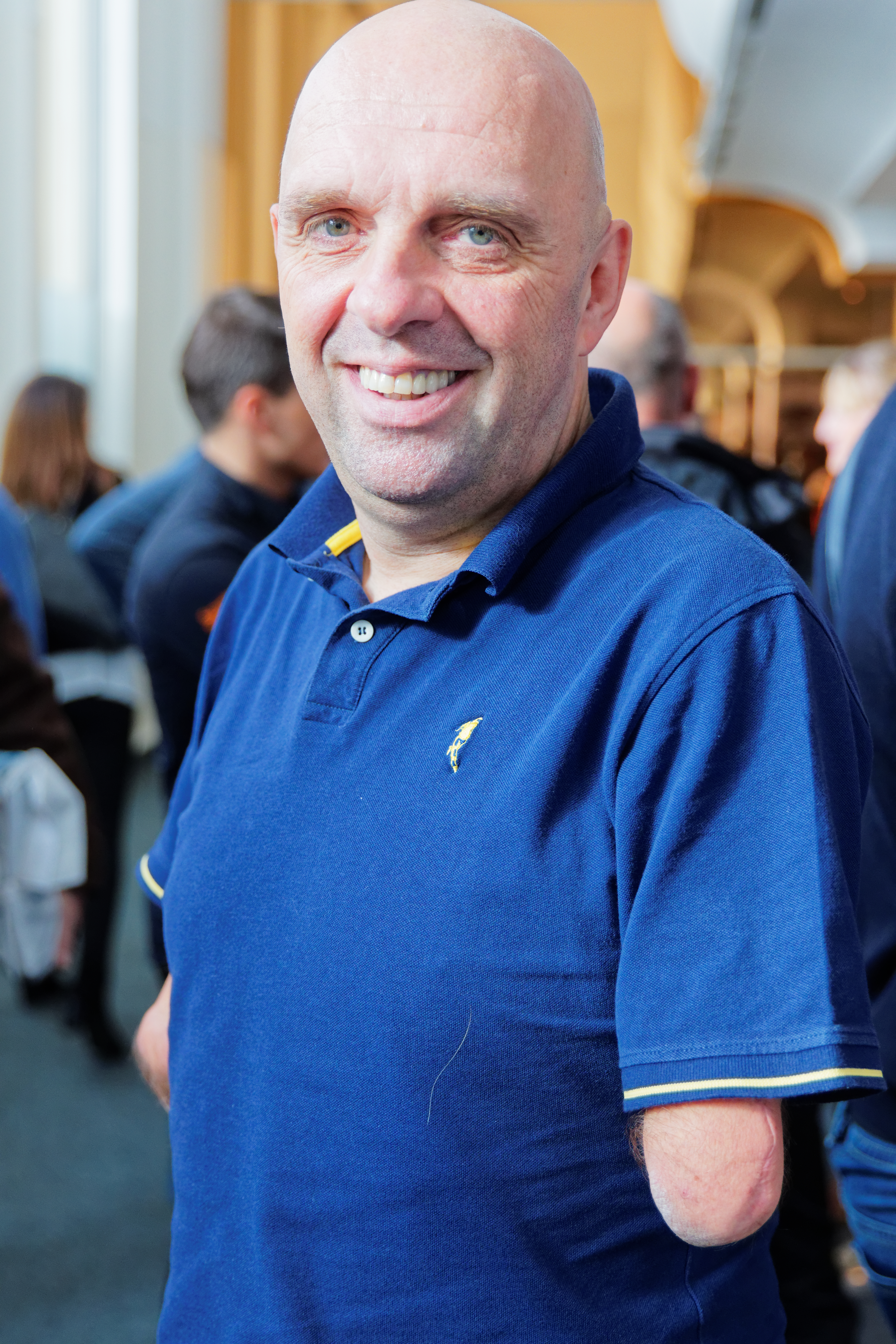
- Philippe Croizon in 2015

Personal information
- Born: 1968 (age 57–58)

Sport
- Sport: Swimming

Philippe Croizon (born 1968) is a French athlete and the first quadruple amputee to swim across the English Channel and to run the Rally Dakar.

== Accident ==
His amputations were required due to a severe electric shock accident which occurred in March 1994. At his home in Saint-Rémy-sur-Creuse, Vienne, while standing on a metal ladder on the roof to work on a television aerial, Croizon received a severe electric shock from a high-voltage power line, which earthed (grounded) through the ladder, to which he became adhered. Twenty minutes passed before a neighbour could raise the alarm. He was hospitalized in Tours, where doctors removed his left arm above the elbow, his right arm below the elbow, then his right leg above the knee. Surgeons had thought that the left leg could be saved, but when that also required removal Croizon reported feeling "despair". At the time Croizon was employed as a steelworker at the foundry of Poitou, 26 years old and married, with one son; his wife was expecting a second child.

== English Channel Challenge ==
=== Preparations ===
During his recuperation in hospital he saw a television programme about a female channel-swimmer, who Croizon said inspired him. He began a regimen of swimming, training for more than five hours a day with the Maritime Gendarmerie, the French marine police, in the sea near La Rochelle. He experimented with different prosthetic limbs designed for swimming, with fins attached to the stumps of his legs. One set of specially designed prosthetics cost €12,000 and are made from carbon and titanium.

He wrote a book entitled J'ai décidé de vivre (I Decided to Live), using a speech-to-text computer system. He also made a parachute jump.

Croizon's preparations for the channel-swim attempt took 35 hours a week for two years, throughout which period he received letters of support from national politicians, including then-President of France Nicolas Sarkozy. It was during this period that he completed a swim from Noirmoutier to Pornic in less than five hours.

=== Event ===
On Saturday, 18 September 2010, at the age of 42, he swam across the English Channel in less than 14 hours. He set off from Folkestone at 06:45, arriving at Cap Gris Nez at 20:13, a distance of 21 miles (34 km).

After the crossing, he reported that he had felt pain, but was confident that he would finish.

== Intercontinental Straits Swimming Challenge ==
In April 2012, Croizon announced a new project, to swim four straits separating five continents, in which he would be accompanied by long-distance swimmer Arnaud Chassery. The planned trips included Oceania to Asia, across the Red Sea (linking Asia and Africa), the Straits of Gibraltar (linking Africa and Europe), and the Bering Strait (linking Asia and America).

Croizon completed the first swim, linking Oceania and Asia, in May 2012, when he swam 20 km (12 miles) from Papua New Guinea to Indonesia in seven-and-a-half hours, accompanied by Chassery and a local Papua New Guinean man, Zet Tampa, who swam with them in support. Their course was along New Guinea Island, shared by both countries.

In June, he crossed the Red Sea from Egypt to Jordan, over a distance of 19 km (12 miles) in about 5 hours.

Croizon completed his Straits of Gibraltar crossing in July, from Tarifa, Spain, over 14 km (9 mi), to land near the city of Tangier, Morocco. He completed the journey with a friend in "just over five hours."

His planned August Bering Strait swim from Little Diomede Island, across the international date line, to Russian Big Diomede, was to occur a week after the 25th anniversary of Lynne Cox's historic crossing on 7 August 1987. Croizon's training regimens included temperature conditioning for the below 40-degree (F) water by swimming in ice-melt mountain lake water, and ice water baths. The 13 August dawn attempt was delayed, then canceled, due a storm arriving early. When a lull in the bad weather arrived on 17 August, the team's start was delayed by high waves until the late afternoon (3 pm local time). Croizon and Arnaud completed the 4.3 km (2.7 miles) swim across the Bering Strait in one hour and 20 minutes. Dense fog and strong currents added time and distance to the trip in 4 degree C (39 F) water. After crossing the International Date Line they continued for a few hundred yards to Great Diomede island in Russian waters without official permission.

== Wheelchair ==
Croizon has a customised electric wheelchair that cost €24,000 to build. In August 2013 it was stolen but recovered a few days later after much publicity in the media and on Twitter.

== Dakar ==
He participated in the 2017 Dakar Rally with a modified buggy, finishing in 48th place out of 317 starters.

== Publications ==
- Croizon, Philippe (2006), J'ai décidé de vivre [I decided to live] (in French), Paris: Jean-Claude Gawsewitch, ISBN 978-2-350-13073-6
