= Three Peaks Bike Race =

Annual ultra-distance bike race in the Alps

The Three Peaks Bike Race is an ultra-distance bike race that has been held yearly since 2018. It starts in Vienna and crosses the Alps and, every other year, the Pyrenees. The finish alternates yearly between Nice and Barcelona.

The participants have to reach three Mountain peaks or passes named by the race organizers. They have to plan and choose their own route between these checkpoints. Riders cover between 2,000 and 2,700 kilometres and climb between 20,000 and 40,000 metres. During the race, the participants ride fully self-supported, carrying their own equipment and obtaining their own food (bikepacking). The leading riders arrive at the finish line in about four days. The finish closes ten days (since 2023: twelve days) after the start of the race but participants that arrive past that point in time are still named in the classification. In 2022, 91 of 243 starters reached the finish; 81 stayed within the time limit.

The 2020 edition of the race is the subject of the documentary Three Peaks & In Between by Stephan Wieser, which follows rider Jana Kesenheimer over the course of the event.

== Route and winners ==
Year	Finish	Mandatory checkpoints	Fastest rider	Fastest female rider
2018	Nice	Giau Pass – Furka Pass – Col du Galibier	Samuel Thompson	–
2019	Barcelona	Stelvio Pass – Colle delle Finestre – Ordino-Arcalís	Xavier Pesnel	Sonia Barrar
2020	Nice	Grossglockner – Sanetsch Pass – Mont Ventoux	Ulrich Bartholmoes	Fanny Bensussan
2021	Barcelona	Mangart Saddle – Männlichen – Col du Tourmalet	Adam Bialek	Jana Kesenheimer
2022	Nice	Tre Cime di Lavaredo & Giau Pass – Tannalp (at Melchsee-Frutt) – Nivolet Pass (– Mont Ventoux)	Justinas Leveika	Luisa Werner
2023	Barcelona	Timmelsjoch, Jaufen Pass & Sella Pass (either direction) – Mounts of Cantal with Puy Mary – Col de la Core, Col de Portet d’Aspet & Col de Menté (either direction)	Adam Bialek	Fanny Bensussan
2024	Nice	Start parcour out of Vienna - Monte Zoncolan (West to East) - Grimsel Pass (either direction) - La Planche des Belles Filles (either direction) - Finish parcour from Alpe d'Huez to Nice	Dominique Schwab	Jill Hovekamp
2025	Nice	Start parcour out of Vienna - Monte Grappa (West to East) - Feldberg (Black Forest) & Belchen (fixed route; either direction) - Colle delle Finestre (North to South) - Finish parcour from Puimoisson to Nice	Belgium Laurens Van Gucht	Germany Larissa Unsinn
