= Mike Hall (cyclist) =

British sport cyclist

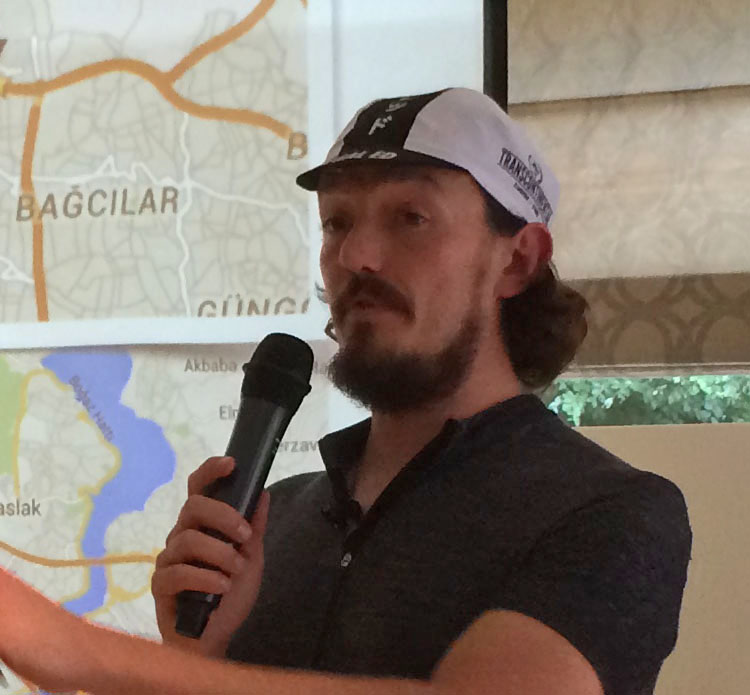
- Hall before the 2015 Transcontinental Race at Geraardsbergen, Belgium
- Born: 4 June 1981; Harrogate, United Kingdom
- Died: 31 March 2017 (aged 35) near Canberra, ACT, Australia
- Occupations: Bicycle race organiser and engineer
- Known for: Winner of multiple ultra-distance, self-supported bicycle races and organiser of the Transcontinental Race

Michael Richard Hall (4 June 1981 – 31 March 2017) was a British cyclist and race organiser who specialised in self-supported ultra-distance cycling races. In 2012, he won the inaugural World Cycle Race. In 2013 and 2016, he won the Tour Divide ultra-endurance mountain bike race across the Rocky Mountains in Canada and the United States. In 2014, he won the inaugural Trans Am Bike Race, a road-based event from the Pacific coast to the Atlantic coast in the United States. From 2013, he was the principal organiser of the Transcontinental Race, an event similar to the TransAm Bicycle Race, but that traverses Europe. Michael Hall was also featured in the cycling film Inspired to Ride a film directed by Mike Dion.

Hall died after being struck by a car, just south of Canberra, during the inaugural Indian Pacific Wheel Race across Australia, on 31 March 2017, after covering just over 5,000 km of the 5,500 km distance.

== Race results ==
Hall started racing mountain bikes as a teenager, but became more serious in 2009 (aged 28) when he started competing in 24 hour mountain bike races. His first ultra-distance self-supported race was the Tour Divide in 2011. While riding in the top 10, he acquired a knee injury, but still finished the race. He then won a major ultra-distance event in 4 of the next 5 years:

Year	Event	Position	Time
2011	Tour Divide	11th	19 days 8 hours 47 mins
2012	World Cycle Race	1st	91 days 18 hours
2013	Tour Divide	1st	14 days 11 hours 55 mins
2014	TransAm Bicycle Race	1st	17 days 16 hours 17 mins
2016	Tour Divide	1st	13 days 22 hours 51 mins

The 91 days and 18 hours for the 2012 World Cycle Race does not include transfer and flight times, which is how Guinness World Records measured it at the time, and this was faster than the current around the world cycling record, but his attempt was never ratified by Guinness. He completed the 2013 Tour Divide in a time faster than the current record, but did not qualify for the record due to the route being altered that year to avoid forest fires. In the 2016 Tour Divide, he beat the record and rode the complete, official route. After three editions of the Trans Am Bike Race, the time that Hall set in the inaugural edition was broken by Evan Deutsch in 2017. Hall was killed while riding in second place in the 2017 Indian Pacific Wheel Race, having completed more than 5,000 km of the almost 5,500 km race.

== Race organisation ==
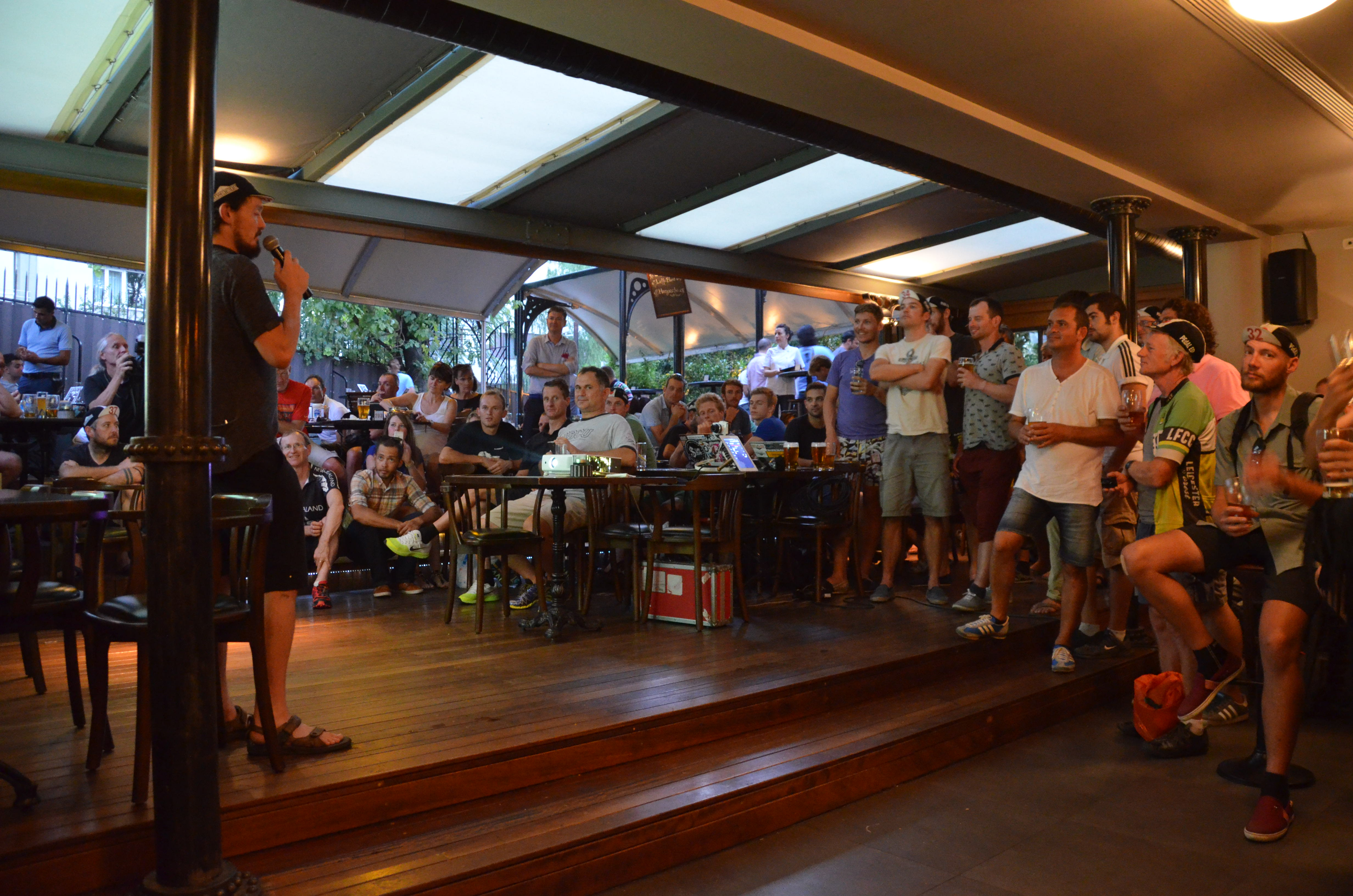
Finish party for the 2014 TCR, with Mike Hall on the microphone

In 2013, Hall founded the Transcontinental Race (TCR) and was the main organiser until he died in 2017. The TCR is an annual, self-supported, ultra-distance bicycle race across Europe. The TCR has no set route except that the riders must pass several intermediate checkpoints at iconic locations, which vary every year. The distance has varied between 3,200 and 4,200 km, and has crossed the continent on different routes approximately between the English Channel and the Mediterranean/Black Sea. The race has grown rapidly from having 30 people start the first edition in 2013 to receiving more than 1,000 applications for the 350 places available for the fourth edition in 2016.

When Hall was asked about his motivation for setting up the TCR he said "there was a demand growing for both a European based ultra on a similar scale to Race Across America, and also an unsupported alternative to the race".

Hall also organised Valleycat rides. These were small events near his home in Wales where people, primarily from the Transcontinental Race community, met, went bikepacking and rode an ultra-distance (200–400 km) Alleycat-style race. The first Valleycat took place in autumn 2015 and helped to raise money for the Newborns Vietnam charity.

== Other work ==
A feature-length documentary, called Inspired to Ride was made about the 2014 Trans Am Bike Race, which Hall won. In addition to several interviews during the race, the documentary included a section where Hall was interviewed and filmed riding around where he lived in South Wales, UK.

Hall helped to raise money for the charity Newborns Vietnam, a UK-based charity that aims to "improve access to and quality of newborn care in the poorest rural areas" of Vietnam. Hall asked people to donate to the charity in honor of him doing the 2012 World Cycle Race. In 2013 and 2015 he led a group of cyclists (with Juliana Buhring in 2015) in the Vietnam Challenge Ride organised by Cycle A Difference that also raised money for Newborns Vietnam.

== Death and legacy ==
Hall died after being struck by a car during the Indian Pacific Wheel Race from Fremantle to Sydney, on 31 March 2017. At the time he was placed second in the race and had covered 5,024 km. He was killed just before dawn on the Monaro Highway, at the intersection of the Monaro Highway and Williamsdale Road, on the outskirts of Canberra at approximately 6:20 a.m. By 3 April a fund raising page, set up after his death, had raised over £70,000 for Hall's family. His death was ruled avoidable by the coroner, and road safety improvements in the area have been suggested.

A memorial service was held in Harrogate on 2 May 2017. Since June 2018, a series of Audax UK events have been held in Mid Wales titled "This is not a tour" in memory of Hall.
