= Race to the Rock =

Unsupported ultra-distance bicycle race

The Race to the Rock is an annual unsupported ultra-distance bicycle race through the Australian Outback organized by Jesse Carlsson. Unlike stage races, such as the Tour De France, ultra-distance races start and run continuously until the competitors finish the race, forcing them to make such strategic choices as whether it would be better to take time to eat or sleep, or to sacrifice those things and press on. Race to the Rock is an unsupported race, which means that racers are not permitted to draft or to obtain help from anything other than publicly available sources that are available for all. The course varies every year, but finishes at Uluru, also known as Ayers Rock, and has been so gruelling that only a very small percentage of the competitors have ever finished the race. Roads are mostly unsealed, with limited water supplies, and stretches of 400-500 kilometres at times with no food resupply available.

== History ==
Carlsson was inspired to create Race to the Rock by the "overlanders" who crossed Australia in the late 19th century when there were no roads, no towns, and no water sources. The course was so tough that only one rider, Sarah Hammond (the only female competitor), was able to complete the first edition. Carlsson competed, but had to withdraw with a broken wrist. Hammond won the race again in 2017 and 2018. In 2017, five riders completed the race: Hammond, Kevin Benkenstein, Jesse Carlsson, Fernando De Andrade and Nicholas Skewes. Benkenstein was the first man to complete the race, with Carlsson having the fastest known time for the 2017 course after a late start caused by a mechanical. In 2018, four riders were able to complete the race: again Hammond, Erinn Klein, Nick Skarajew, and Emma Flukes. Skarajew became the only rider to complete the race on a single speed bike.

In 2019, the race started at Port Douglas, travelling south to Townsville and then inland. The race finish was changed 10 days into the event due to difficulties with obtaining permits for the later parts of the route, with the new finish announced as Alice Springs. Jesse Carlsson had already passed Alice Springs when the finish was changed and was therefore the winner of the event.

The 2020 edition, like in the original 2016 event, commenced in Adelaide and finished in Uluru.

No race was held in 2021 due to restrictions related to the COVID-19 pandemic.

The 2022 edition of the race began in Sydney ('Race from the Rocks') and finished in Adelaide.

Brisbane was the starting point for the 2023 race, heading north to Rockhampton before turning west to Uluru.

In 2024, the race ran from the harbour at Derby, Western Australia to Uluru, in the Northern Territory. With eleven competitors and six finishers, there was just over two hours gap between winner April Drage, and Erinn Klein in second place. In 2025, the race commenced at the Sydney Opera House and finished at Uluru. David Langley was the first finisher in 16days, 15 hours and 55 minutes, approximately 10 hours ahead of Nick Edwards.

== Results ==
Year	Start	Winner	Second place
2016	Adelaide, South Australia	Sarah Hammond	None
2017	Albany, Western Australia	Sarah Hammond	Kevin Benkenstein
2018	Cockle Creek, Tasmania	Sarah Hammond	Erinn Klein
2019	Port Douglas, Queensland	Jesse Carlsson	Erinn Klein
2020	Adelaide, South Australia	Erinn Klein	Stephen Leske
2022	Sydney, New South Wales	Erinn Klein	Sacha Dowell
2023	Brisbane, Queensland	TheMagicalWhiteRhino	David Langley
2024	Derby, Western Australia	April Drage	Erinn Klein
2025	Sydney, New South Wales	David Langley	Nick Edwards
2026	Melbourne, Victoria	Aidan Lampe	
