= Tour Divide =

Cycling event

The Tour Divide is an annual mountain biking ride traversing the length of the Rocky Mountains, from Banff, Canada to the Mexico–United States border. Following the 2,745-mile (4,418 km) Great Divide Mountain Bike Route, it is an ultra-distance cycling ride that is an extreme test of endurance, self-reliance and mental toughness. The ride format is strictly self-supported, and it is not a stage race - the clock runs continuously from the start until riders cross the finish line, usually more than two weeks later.

The ride has a very low profile, and is entirely amateur. There are no entry fees, no sponsorship, and no prizes. Although "letters of intent" from likely starters are encouraged, any rider may turn up on the day to participate. Challenges along the route include mountains, great distances between resupply towns, risk of mechanical failure or injury, bears, poor weather, snowfall, and significant unrideable sections that require pushing the bike. Riders usually adopt a "bikepacking" style, carrying minimal equipment sufficient for camping or bivouacking, and only enough food and water to last until the next town. In this way, riders ride huge distances each day, the current ride record averaging over 186 miles (300 km) per day.

The Tour Divide has been ridden and completed on both single speed bicycles and tandem bicycles. It usually starts on the second Friday in June - at an event called Grand Départ. The ride can also be completed at any time as an individual time trial (ITT).

Due to the extreme distances, inaccessibility of the route, lack of television coverage and small number of participants, spectating is impractical. However, many riders carry SPOT Satellite Messenger tracking devices, allowing their progress to be continuously monitored on websites.

== Records ==
Ride records are maintained in several categories, and do not distinguish between times set during the official annual ride, or in individual time trials set at any time. Categories include male, female and tandem. As the route changes fairly frequently, the overall length and difficulty can vary, meaning year-to-year records are not exactly comparable.

- Male: 11 days, 19 hours, 14 minutes by Robin Gemperle in 2025
- Female: 14 days, 23 hours, 12 minutes by Austin Killips in August 2024

== Winners ==
| Year | Male winner | Male winner's time | Female winner | Female winner's time |
|---|---|---|---|---|
| 2008 | Matthew Lee | 19 days 12 hours 0 mins | Mary Collier | 29 days 17 hours 37 mins |
| 2009 | Matthew Lee | 17 days 23 hours 45 mins | Jill Homer | 24 days 07 hours 24 mins |
| 2010 | Matthew Lee | 17 days 16 hours 10 mins | Cricket Butler | 26 days 9 hours 36 mins |
| 2011 | Kurt Refsnider | 15 days 20 hours 51 mins | Caroline Soong | 22 days 9 hours 59 mins |
| 2012 | Ollie Whalley | 16 days 2 hours 54 mins | Eszter Horanyi | 19 days 3 hours 35 mins |
| 2013 | Mike Hall | 14 days 11 hours 55 mins | Sara Dalman | 22 days 19 hours 05 mins |
| 2014 | Jefe Branham | 16 days 2 hours 39 mins | Alice Drobna | 22 days 6 hours 36 mins |
| 2015 | Josh Kato | 14 days 11 hours 37 mins | Lael Wilcox | 17 days 01 hours 51 mins |
| 2016 | Mike Hall | 13 days 22 hours 51 mins | Jackie Bernardi | 19 days 21 hours 41 mins |
| 2017 | Brian Lucido | 14 days 22 hours 50 mins | Marketa Peggy Marvanova | 22 days 18 hours 04 minutes |
| 2018 | Lewis Ciddor | 15 days 2 hours 8 minutes | Alexandera Houchin | 23 days 3 hours 51 minutes |
| 2019 | Christopher Seistrup | 15 days 11 hours 24 mins | Alexandera Houchin | 18 days 20 hours 26 minutes |
| 2020 | cancelled, Covid-19 | - | - | - |
| 2021 | Jay Petervary *border to border | 14 days 19 hours 15 mins | Lauren Brownlee | 20 days 05 hours 43 mins |
| 2022 | Sofiane Sehili | 14 days 16 hours 36 mins | Ana Jager | 19 days 00 hours 44 mins |
| 2023 | Ulrich Bartholmoes | 14 days 3 hours 23 mins | Lael Wilcox | 16 days 20 hours 00 mins |
| 2024 | Justinas Leveika | 13 days 2 hours 16 mins | Meaghan Hackinen | 15 days 23 hours 00 mins |
| 2025 | Robin Gemperle | 11 days 19 hours 14 mins | Nathalie Baillon | 16 days 10 hours 17 mins |
| 2026 | Victor Bosoni | 11 days 08 hours 37 mins | Meaghan Hackinen | 14 days 10 hours 2 mins |

== Media coverage ==
The event remains a niche phenomenon, receiving little coverage in mainstream media. A documentary film, Ride the Divide was produced during the 2008 running. It followed several riders, including eventual winner Matthew Lee. The documentary won the "Best Adventure Film" Award at the 2010 Vail Film Festival.

Live reports for the 2018, 2019 and 2021 races which weaves together information from TrackLeaders, the riders' social media, MTBCast and direct contact with the racers to build a comprehensive picture of the race.

== Similar ride ==
The Trans Am Bike Race (TABR) is similar to the Tour Divide in that riders have to be completely self-supported and a fixed route is used, the main difference is that the TABR is on paved roads. The TABR uses the TransAmerica Bicycle Trail, which runs from the Pacific coast in Oregon, United States, to the Atlantic Coast in Virginia, and like the route of the Tour Divide, was developed by the Adventure Cycling Association.
