= Ultra-distance cycling =

Long distance cycling

Ultra-races can take place on any type of surface

Ultra-distance cycling is the riding of any bike race or route longer than an imperial century ride, which is 100 miles (160 km). However, such events are relatively common, so using a longer distance to define the category may be more useful, such as any race or ride that is longer than 200 kilometres (120 mi), 300 kilometres (190 mi) or even a double century, 200 miles (320 km). The definition of ultra-distance cycling is far more vague and controversial than in ultra running (any race longer than a marathon) or in ultra-triathlon (any race longer than an Ironman Triathlon).

Bike events that cover these distances but which are split into stages do not fit most definitions of ultra-distance races – the clock needs to run continuously from start to finish. Even so, extra-long stages within a longer race may be long enough to be an ultra-distance race by themselves. In addition, any team events in which individual cyclists do not complete the full distance are not considered to be ultra-distance.

Bike races that can be described as ultra-distance are organized below according to the type or format of the race. This is not an exhaustive list of such races, but the longest, most important (as measured by the level of media interest), or most popular (as measured by the number of participants) races within each category are mentioned.

== Track cycling ==
In the early days of bicycle racing in the late 1800s, six-day racing on velodromes was popular. Only the original race format is a true ultra-distance cycling race as defined here because it was a simple test of how far an individual cyclist could ride during the six day-long event. The format evolved away from this to involve teams of two riding in a relay format. Later, the non-stop nature of the race was changed to only race during part of each day.

== Road racing ==
=== Professional ===
In the early days of professional road bicycle racing there were many one-day road races and stages in grand tours that were much longer than those of today. Bordeaux–Paris in France was the longest one-day, annual professional bike race; it had a route of about 560 kilometres (350 mi) and was run almost every year between 1891 and 1988. After 1988, the longest one-day professional bike race became Porto–Lisboa in Portugal, which was about 330 kilometres (210 mi) long. Porto–Lisboa was last held in 2004, and Milan–San Remo in Italy has since then been the longest race at 298 kilometres (185 mi).

Paris–Brest–Paris was a professional bike race that covered a massive 1,200 kilometres (750 mi) in France, and was only held every 10 years from 1891 until 1951, but has since continued as a randonneuring event (see below).

Cycling's grand tours used to include far longer stages than they do today. The longest ever Tour de France stage was 482 kilometres (300 mi) in the 1919 Tour and that year every one of the 15 stages was more than 300 kilometres (190 mi) long. The longest ever stage in the Giro d'Italia was 430 kilometres (270 mi) in the 1914 Giro and that year 5 of the 8 stages were longer than 400 kilometres (250 mi). The Vuelta a España did not begin until 1935 and the first edition was when its longest-ever stage was held, which was 310 kilometres (190 mi). In modern grand tours, stages longer than 200 kilometres (120 mi) are increasingly rare and the limit set by the Union Cycliste Internationale (UCI) for any individual stage during a stage race is 240 km.

=== Supported ultracycling races ===
There are no longer any true ultra-distance bike races (i.e., that are longer than 300 kilometres (190 mi)) that are affiliated with cycling's main governing body, the UCI; most modern ultra-distance races are instead affiliated with the World Ultra-Cycling Association (WUCA). By far the best-known of these races is the Race Across America (RAAM), a non-stop race across the United States that generally covers over 4,800 kilometres (3,000 mi).

In this format of racing, the cyclists race individually (drafting and group riding are not allowed) but each cyclist has at least one support vehicle and a team of support staff. This specific format of racing is often referred to as "ultracycling", which is why it would be incorrect to refer to all ultra-distance cycling as ultracycling. Many ultracycling races include a team category that operates in a relay format and so does not meet the criteria for an ultra-distance cycling race used here (in which individuals must ride the complete distance).

Other ultracycling races include the Race ACross Europe (RACE), which is 4,722 kilometres (2,934 mi) long. The oldest ultracycling race in Europe is the Glocknerman, an Austrian cycling event with a distance of 1,000 kilometres (620 mi) that was first held in 1997. The Race Across The Alps is only 540 kilometres (340 mi) long but contains over 13,000 metres (43,000 ft) of climbing and so the organizers claim it to be the hardest one-day race in the world.

The first Race Across Russia was held in 2013 as a non-stop team relay event with a total distance of about 9,200 kilometres (5,700 mi) between Moscow and Vladivostok. In 2015 it became the Red Bull Trans-Siberian Extreme with a solo category and the route was split into 15 separate stages, each between 300 kilometres (190 mi) and 1,400 kilometres (870 mi) long.

=== Road time trials ===
12-hour and 24-hour road cycling time trials have been around for a long time and are still common. In these events, cyclists attempt to ride the maximum distance possible within the time limit. The current 24 hour record is over 1,200 kilometres (750 mi) in a velomobile. Christoph Strasser set the current 24 hour road record on a normal road bike at 1,026.21 kilometres (637.66 mi) in Zeltweg, Austria on 16 July 2021 (see List of cycling records). In 2014, the UMCA revived interest in the highest annual mileage record, which was last set in 1939 by Tommy Godwin at 120,805 kilometres (75,065 mi). This involves riding the maximum distance possible within a 12-month period. In early 2016, Kurt Searvogel broke the record, achieving a distance of 122,433 kilometres (76,076 mi) in one year or 335 kilometres (208 mi) per day. In 2017 Amanda Coker surpassed Kurt's annual mileage record with a new record of over 86,000 miles (138,000 km) in 365 days, and then continued on to break the record for fastest time to 100,000 miles, at approximately 420 days.

Some ultra-distance time trials are held at permanent motorsport racetracks, such as Bike Sebring (Sebring International Raceway), Rad am Ring (Nürburgring), Monza 12h Cycling Marathon (Autodromo Nazionale Monza), Cycling Zandvoort 24h (Circuit Zandvoort), 24h BiCircuit Festival (Circuit de Barcelona-Catalunya), and Revolve24 Endurance Cycling Challenge (Brands Hatch and The Bend Motorsport Park). These lack any road traffic and have smooth road surfaces.

=== Unsupported ultracycling & bikepacking road races ===
Some races have recently become popular that recall the early era of professional bike racing in which riders were unsupported and raced day and night. Among the most popular of these is the Transcontinental Race, which covers approximately 4,000 kilometres (2,500 mi) across Europe and was inspired by the off-road US event Tour Divide. As in other ultra-cycling events there is a mass start, but in bikepacking races drafting is not allowed and all support is forbidden. There are no support vehicles and riders must find all of their supplies, accommodation, etc. from commercial sources along the route or bring it with them. Most events will, however, allow "trail magic" from strangers through kind actions, gifts, and other forms of encouragement so long as the "magic" does not move the bike. Other popular examples in this category include the Trans Am Bike Race of 6,800 kilometres (4,200 mi), and the IncaDivide, an event with a shorter distance of 1,800 kilometres (1,100 mi) but that takes riders above 4,920 metres (16,140 ft) in the Andes mountains of Peru. The latter is part of the BikingMan series, an ultra bikepacking race series that first took place in 2019 in Oman, France, Laos, Peru, Portugal and Taiwan with a standard distance of 1,000 kilometres (620 mi).

In Europe, the Transiberica, the Three Peaks Bike Race, the Race Around Ireland, and the Race Around Poland, all established in 2018, are major free-route unsupported races, covering distances from 1,500 up to 3,000 km.

Around South East Asia, the Bentang Jawa, Race Across Java, Lintang Flores and JavaBali are ultra challenges in Indonesia. In Malaysia, Peninsular Divide offers an All-Road category offers 1500km distance of 93% paved 7% unpaved and elevation gain between 14000-18000m.

Unsupported rides are sometimes done as completely solo attempts outside of organized rides but are still well-publicized. These often involve riding point to point (including city to city), for example Vegas In 24.

=== Randonneuring ===
Randonneuring events (also called brevets or audaxes) are generally non-competitive rides where racing is not the focus; they are ridden more as personal challenges. They also differ from most ultracycling and bikepacking races in that group riding and drafting is allowed, with limits. Supplies and accommodation are often provided by the organizers at intermediate checkpoints, but the use of support vehicles is not allowed outside of the checkpoints.

The most famous of this type of event is Paris-Brest-Paris in France, in which over 5,000 people attempt to complete the 1,200 kilometres (750 mi) long route in under 90 hours. The randonnee version evolved from the professional bike race (see above) and is held every four years. There are many similar events of between 1,000 kilometres (620 mi) and 1,600 kilometres (990 mi) around the world, including London–Edinburgh–London in the UK and the Cascade 1200 in the USA. For a more complete list, see the page on randonneuring. There are also many more shorter-distance randonneuring rides, which are typically 200 kilometres (120 mi), 300 kilometres (190 mi), or 600 kilometres (370 mi) long.

=== Cyclosportives/Gran fondos ===
Cyclosportives (also known as gran fondos) are mass-participation cycling events. They are far less serious than pure bike races, but times are recorded and prizes are often awarded to the fastest people. The organizers normally provide full support in terms of marking the route and providing feed stations.

The event that proclaims itself to be the "longest Granfondo in the world" follows almost the same route as the professional Milan–San Remo bike race and is 296 kilometres (184 mi) long. However, there are several similar events that are longer. Bordeaux–Paris was a professional race until 1988 and returned in 2014 as a cyclosportive with a route of about 610 kilometres (380 mi). Styrkeprøven Trondheim–Oslo is a 543-kilometre (337 mi) long race and cyclosportive in Norway. The Tour du Mont Blanc is a 330 kilometres (210 mi) long cyclosportive over mountainous terrain through France, Switzerland, and Italy. Slightly longer still is the Wysam 333 in Switzerland at 333 kilometres (207 mi). There is also the Mallorca 312, which is a 312 kilometres (194 mi) long ride around the island of Mallorca, the Dragon Devil version of the Dragon Ride Wales cyclosportive in the UK is 305 kilometres (190 mi) long, and the Vätternrundan cyclosportive that does a tour of the Swedish lake is 315 kilometres (196 mi) long.

In New Zealand, there is the Lake Taupo Cycle Challenge. The standard cyclosportive option involves a single lap of the lake, which is 160 kilometres (99 mi) long, but there are also options to do two laps in one day for 320 kilometres (200 mi), with no support on the first lap, or start one day earlier and do four laps, 640 kilometres (400 mi), which is more of a randonneuring-format event. Every second year there is also an 8 lap option, 1,280 kilometres (800 mi) long, but a following support vehicle is required for that version making it more of an ultracycling-format event.

=== Century rides ===
In the US, organized century rides of 100 miles (160 km) are common, with the format falling between a cyclosportive and a randonnee. There are also many organized double centuries of 200 miles (320 km), one of the more popular ones being the Seattle to Portland Bicycle Classic, and at least one event even offers 300 miles (480 km) and 400 miles (640 km) options, the Los Angeles Wheelmen Grand Tour.

=== Other road cycling records ===
There are a few classic long-distance cycling routes for which time records are kept even though riders normally do not race simultaneously. These include Land's End to John o' Groats in the United Kingdom, which is about 1,400 kilometres (870 mi). On the longer end of the spectrum, there is Cairo to Cape Town in Africa, which is about 11,000 kilometres (6,800 mi). This record is currently held by Scottish endurance cyclist Mark Beaumont. The longest record of this format is the around the world cycling record, which requires the cyclist to cover 29,000 kilometres (18,000 mi) by bike plus other requirements. In 2024, American ultra-endurance cyclist Lael Wilcox set the women's record for an unsupported circumnavigation of the globe by bicycle in 108 Days, 12 hours and 12 minutes. In 2012 and 2014, a mass-start event called the World Cycle Race was organized based on these rules.

== Gravel biking ==
In the early days of road bike racing, most roads were not paved, so most races were held primarily on unpaved/dirt/gravel roads. Due to road infrastructure improving with time, road bike racing is now done almost entirely on paved roads. However, in the 21st century, riding and racing road bikes on gravel roads has gained popularity, at least in part due to improvements in technology.

Bicycle technology is seen as the largest contributor to the popularity of gravel biking because technology has allowed designers to integrate key characteristics of bikes across disciplines into one bike. For instance, the relaxed geometry of mountain bikes is the foundation of gravel bike frames but gravel bikes are lighter, faster and more responsive than a mountain bike. Gravel bikes also use characteristics of both cyclocross and road bikes for better comfort on long rides and the wheel clearance to accommodate rides done in torrential conditions.

The culture of gravel biking has also been another reason it has grown in popularity. Gravel races rarely call for a team of coaches and bicycle technicians because the courses susceptible to varying weather that is hard to train and prepare for. Gravel riders are generally focused on getting through a course rather than maintaining a pace during races. This give way to camaraderie on the trail and caters to a fun and relaxed atmosphere that is not always present in road and mountain bike races.

One of the longest and most famous of the modern gravel bike races is Unbound Gravel (formerly called Dirty Kanza) in the Flint Hills around Emporia, Kansas, USA, which is 320 kilometres (200 mi) long. In 2018, a 350 miles (560 km) race called the DKXL was added, and 40, 80 and 161 km (25, 50 and 100 mi) courses were added in 2013. In the UK, the Dirty Reiver is a 200-kilometre (120 mi) off-road cycling challenge that takes place in Hexham, England.

Unbound Gravel is a notable example of the growth of gravel biking in recent years. In 2006 there was a total of 34 riders that participated in the 200 mile race. In June 2019, 2,750 riders randomly selected from a lottery competed in the Dirty Kanza 200.

== Mountain biking ==
As on the road, some of the most popular ultra-distance mountain bike events are 12 and 24-hour time trials, of which there are many all over the world. In addition, there are many mountain bike races of 100 miles (160 km). Fewer mountain bike races are longer than 100 miles (160 km) because the average speed on typical mountain biking terrain is much slower than that on the road.

24 hour mountain bike races are where the bikepacking genre began, in which riders are entirely self-supported (see above for road-based bikepacking events). One of the most famous and popular off-road bikepacking events is the Tour Divide, which covers 4,418 kilometres (2,745 mi) across the Rocky Mountains from Canada, through the US, and finishes at the Mexican border. The Iditarod Trail Invitational in Alaska is run on snow bikes in winter and is 1,000 miles (1,600 km) long. The most popular off-road bikepacking race in Europe is the Tuscany Trail, which covers 530 kilometres (330 mi) in central Italy. Also in Italy, the Italy Divide starts at the Roman Coliseum and finishes at Lake Garda, passing through Siena, Florence and Bologna en route. It mixes technical mountain bike sections with gravel trails.

In Central Asia, the Silk Road Mountain Race takes place in Kyrgyzstan, and covers 1,700 km (1,056 mi) in the Tien Shan mountain range.

The Titan Desert is a six-day stage race held in Morocco with a total distance of over 600 kilometres (370 mi).

In Australia, the Race to the Rock is an unsupported race through the Outback founded by Jesse Carlsson. The course and length differs each year, but generally finishes at Uluru; the 2018 edition was 3,500 km (2,175 mi) in total, and covered sections of Southern Australia as well as Tasmania.

== Climbing-focused (Everesting) ==
Instead of trying to maximize the distance ridden in one ride, some people try to maximize the height gained in one ride. Everesting is a challenge that involves repeatedly cycling up and down the same hill multiple times until the total height gain matches the height of Mount Everest, 8,848 meters (29,029 ft). There are also records for the most height gain achieved within a certain time period, for instance 24 hours.

Everesting came to wider public attention during the height of the coronavirus pandemic when bored professional cyclists went in search of hills when the world tour was shut down.

== See also ==
- Night cycling, cycling when it is dark
