= Susan Notorangelo =

American long distance cyclist (born 1953)

Personal information
- Full name: Susan Diane Notorangelo
- Born: November 30, 1953 United States

Cycling career
- Sport: Cycling
- Discipline: Road
- Role: Rider
- Rider type: Long distance

Susan Notorangelo is an American long distance cyclist. She has ridden in the Race Across America five times, winning the competition in 1985 and 1989.

Susan Diane Notorangelo was born November 30, 1953, in Ferguson, Missouri, near St. Louis. Her father was Anthony Notorangelo and mother Marguerite Beiler. She is the fourth of five children and grew up in Ferguson with a love for the outdoors, gardening, and girl scouts. Today she resides in Sharon, Wisconsin, with her husband, Lon Dennis Haldeman (1958–Present). They had two daughters, Rebecca Notorangelo Haldeman (1987–Present) and Ericka Haldeman (1991-1992).

Notorangelo was the first woman to bicycle across the United States in less than 10 days. From 1982 to 1994 Notorangelo raced across the continent seven times and set five transcontinental cycling records. She rode coast to coast her first time in 1982 and set a new Women's Record of 11 days and 16 hours. She completed that event by riding the final 600 miles nonstop from Ohio to New York City and setting a new standard for long-distance racing strategy.

In 1983 and 1986 she set Tandem Transcontinental Records with her husband Lon Haldeman by crossing the country in 10 days, 20 hours (1983) and 9 days, 20 hours in 1986 which still stands as the current male/female record.

In 1985 and 1989, Notorangelo won the Women's Division of the Race Across America. Her time of 9 days, 9 hours in 1989 averaging 317 miles per day was the first time a woman had bicycled crossed the country in under ten days.

In 1983, Notorangelo set a new Women's Record in the 750-mile Paris-Brest-Paris event in France by completing the event in 53 hours.

During the next 30 years, Notorangelo completed and set records in dozens of cycling events.

== Records ==
Women's 24-Hour Record	401.6 mi	1982
Woman's Transcontinental Record	11d 16h	1983
Paris Brest Paris	53h 40 m	Women's Record
Transcontinental Tandem Record with Lon Haldeman	10d 20h	1985
RAAM First Place Women's Division	10d 14h	1986
RAAM Second Place Women's Division	10d 9h	1986
Mixed Tandem 24-Hour Record with Lon Haldeman	432.40 mi	1986
Transcontinental Tandem Record with Lon Haldeman	9d 20h	1989
RAAM First Place Women's Division	9d 9h	Women's Record
