= Race Around Ireland =

Bicycle race

Race details
- Date: End of Summer
- Region: Ireland

History
- First edition: 2009; 17 years ago
- First winner: Joe Barr (IRE)
- Most recent: Nicole Reist (CHE)

Race Around Ireland is a non-stop bicycle race which traces a route around the coastline of Ireland. The event was first run in 2009 and is a qualifying event for Race Across America, the most famous race in the world of ultra marathon cycling.

The route varies only a little from year to year and has, since its inception, begun and finished in County Meath. In 2017 the finishing riders completed a 2,212 km route which included approximately 22,000m of total climbing.

The event is open to solo riders as well as teams of two, four and eight competitors riding in relay. Riders decide their own rest and nutrition strategy and the winning solo riders will typically spend up to 22 hours a day in the saddle.

Riders are entitled to a support vehicle and riders must complete the course within a specified time as a finisher. The time limit in 2017 for solo men was 132 hours and for women 144 hours.

== Winners ==
The fastest winning solo ride in Race Around Ireland history was recorded by Christoph Strasser in 2013. The Austrian rider completed the 2,209.1 km route in 93 hours, 16 minutes at an average speed of 23.69kmh.

Nicole Reist of Switzerland made history in 2017 by becoming the first woman to lead home all the solo finishers.

Year	Rider	Country	Time	Av. Speed	Start date
2009	Joe Barr	Ireland	108h 12m	19.70 km/h	15 September 2009
2010	Bernd Paul	Germany	113h 12m	19.09 km/h	12 September 2010
2011	Valerio Zamboni	Monaco	131h 36m	16.51 km/h	11 September 2011
2012	Bernd Paul	Germany	106h 14m	20.63 km/h	9 September 2012
2013	Christoph Strasser	Austria	93h 16m	23.69 km/h	
2014	Edvald Fuchs	Austria	101h 11m	21.86 km/h	
2015	Bernard Steinberger	Germany	98h 22m	22.32 km/h	
2016	Guido Löhr	Germany	106h 50m	20.63 km/h	
2017	Nicole Reist	Switzerland	125h 45m	19.71 km/h	
2018	Joe Barr	Ireland	104h 3m	20.74 km/h	26 August 2018
2019	Pierre Bischoff	Germany	101h 55m	21.19 km/h	
