= John Nickles =

American endurance athlete

John Nickles (born 1964, Washington DC) is an elite American triathlete and endurance athlete. Among his accomplishments, he won the World Champion Title in the 1999 Hawaii Ultraman World Championship. In 1994 he set a World Ultra Marathon Cycling Association record when he traversed the Blue Ridge Parkway from Cherokee, NC to Rockfish Gap, VA (470 miles) by bike in 31:30 hours. In 1993 he was a member of the second place team in the Race Across America, which finished the 3000 mile race in 6 days 6 hours.

John is a 1986 graduate of Cornell University and received a master's degree (1988) from Oxford University (Brasenose College) where he was a Full Blue member of the athletics team.
