= Lon Haldeman =

American bicycle racer

Lon Haldeman is an American ultramarathon cyclist. Nicknamed "Marathon Lon", He was the catalyst for ultra distance bicycle racing. His first achievement was in 1979 when he won the Wisconsin End to End Record covering 407 miles in 23 hours 7 minutes. In the 1982 Great American Bike Race, later renamed the Race Across America, he completely changed the parameters, cycling for 9 days and 20 hours with three other cycling pioneers John Howard, John Marino and Michael Shermer.

Lon Haldeman became the first person to ride a bicycle across the United States in less than 10 days. Ever since Thomas Stevens first rode a bicycle across America in 1884 with the time of 103 days, the goal of crossing the country in less than 10 days has been the perennial cycling challenge.

Crossing America in under 10 days was the equivalent of Roger Bannister running and breaking the 4-minute mile barrier. Haldeman was unsuccessful in his first two attempts to break 10 days in 1981. He rode from New York to Santa Monica, California in 12 days and 18 hours. After falling short of the 10-day mark he rested for six hours and then rode back to New York in 10 days, 23 hours. Although both cross country rides set new transcontinental records, they had not surpassed the elusive sub-10 day goal.

Haldeman tried to break the record again the following year when he was invited to enter the Great American Bike Race. The race began on August 4, 1982 and was filmed by ABC Television and shown on the Wide World of Sports. Haldeman won the race from Santa Monica to New York covering 2,976 miles in a time of 9 days, 20 hours and 2 minutes. He was the first cyclist to eclipse the 10-day barrier across America. ABC documented the race with a two-hour prime time program and won an Emmy Award for the best Sports Documentary. The 1982 Great American Bike Race can still be viewed on a ten part series on YouTube. He always remembers the Great American Bike Race as being the most difficult. It took him almost four months to recover and regain feeling in his hands. The four riders in that first race were the pioneers of endurance cycling and set new standards for equipment, diet, and sleep management. He credits his parents and his crew for their nonstop support.

Haldeman would go on to set five more transcontinental records. His fastest crossing was on a tandem bicycle with Pete Penseyres in 1987 with a time of 7 days, 14 hours. Their record is still the fastest non-stop crossing of the United States by bicycle.

Haldeman's wife, Susan Notorangelo would become the first women to set the sub 10-day cross country record. In 1989, she won the Race Across America from Los Angeles to New York in 9 days and 9 hours and 9 minutes. Lon and Susan would set the men's – women's tandem bicycle record in 1986 with a time of 9 days, 20 hours. Their record still stood over 30 years later.

In 2007, the Lon Haldeman Award was created to recognise the Race Across America team that raises the most charitable donations that year.
