= Valerio Zamboni =

Italian ultra cyclist and businessman

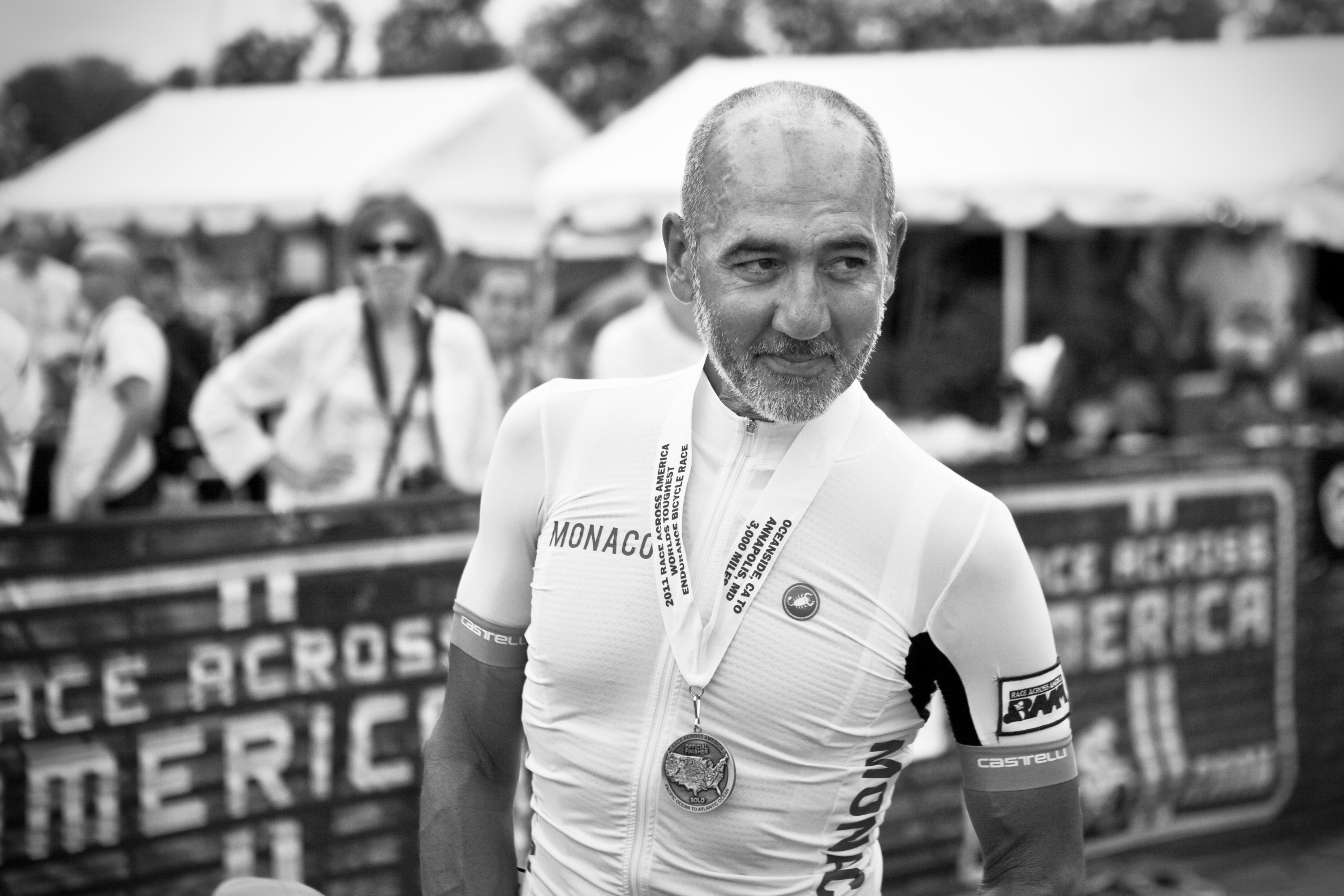
- Zamboni after 2011 Race Across America

Personal information
- Full name: Valerio Zamboni
- Born: 11 March 1954 Anzola dell'Emilia, Bologna, Italy

Cycling career
- Sport: Cycling
- Current team: Zamboni
- Discipline: Ultra-distance cycling
- Role: Rider

Major wins
- 2 times RAAM age category winner (2016, 2018); 2 times Race Around Ireland winner (2011, 2017)

Valerio Zamboni (born 1954) is an Italian ultra cyclist who is a six-time winner World Ultra-Cycling Association World Cup, Ultramarathon World Champion, and record holder in the Race Across America. He is also a pilot and founder of the business aircraft sales and acquisition company NewJet International.

== Early life ==
Valerio Zamboni was born to Italian parents, Norina Balestri and Luciano Zamboni, in Emilia Romagna, Italy. He spent his formative years in Bologna, where he received his primary education. Zamboni pursued his education at the International High School of Languages. He became a glider pilot at a young age. After completing his studies at the Liceo Linguistico internazionale, Zamboni's passion for flying led him to pursue a career as a commercial pilot.

At the age of 23, he relocated to Milan to embark on his first pilot job, starting his professional career in the aviation industry. He earned his commercial licenses and started his career as a co-pilot in 1978, flying the Falcon 10 and Falcon 20 for Milan-based charter operator VIP air.

After being a pilot for about 15 years, now Zamboni own a New Jet International company, which became the exclusive sales representative for Bombardier's Business jet line in some European countries.

== Cycling career ==
Valerio Zamboni was a climbing enthusiast until a severe fall and pelvis reconstruction forced him to stop physical activity. After gaining some weight, Zamboni turned to cycling in 2006 for health reasons. He began practicing at a competition level after undergoing extensive physical and mental training. In 2010, Zamboni participated in his first race, the Sebring, marking the start of his competitive cycling career.

Medal record

Ultra-distance cycling

Representing Monaco

RAAM
Bronze medal – third place	2011	Solo mens(50-59)
Bronze medal – third place	2012	Solo mens(50-59)
Bronze medal – third place	2014	Solo mens(60-69)
Gold medal – first place	2016	Solo mens(60-69)
Gold medal – first place	2018	Solo mens(60-69)
Silver medal – second place	2019	Solo mens(60-69)

Race Around Ireland
Gold medal – first place	2011	Solo mens
Gold medal – first place	2017	Solo mens

Valerio Zamboni's interest in cycling came relatively late in life, particularly in the field of ultracycling. Nevertheless, he was able to achieve a world championship title, and numerous records showcasing his determination and commitment to the sport. At the age of 57, Valerio Zamboni achieved first the Ultramarathon World Champion title in 2011. His multiple Race around Ireland participations led to a 15-minute short film. Zamboni has set various age category records and received multiple awards, including the Indoor Track Record in Montichiari, Italy in 2017, and the Everesting record in France in 2016. He has participated in the Race Across America 11 times, and completed 7 races, receiving numerous accolades for his accomplishments. He has competed in 9 Races Around Italy and he is the only athlete who has always completed them and therefore has the most finisher's medals.

Race results
Year	Event	Category	Position	Time
2011	Race Around Ireland	Solo Mens	(gold) 1st	131 hrs 36 mins
2011	Race across America	Solo mens (50-59)	(bronze) 3rd	10 days 18 hours, 58 mins
2012	Race across America	Solo mens (50-59)	(bronze) 3rd	11 days 18 hours 1 mins
2014	Race across America	Solo mens (60-69)	(bronze) 3rd	12 days 20 hours 6 mins
2016	Race across America	Solo mens (60-69)	(gold) 1st	12 days 14 hours 43 mins
2017	Race Around Ireland	Solo Mens	(gold) 1st	125 hrs 45 mins
2018	Race across America	Solo mens (60-69)	(gold) 1st	12 days 17 hours 28 mins
2019	Race across America	Solo mens (60-69)	(silver) 2nd	12 days 12 hours 24 mins

== World records ==
Valerio Zamboni Records officially certified by World UltraCycling Association
Record Type	Details	Category	Bike Type	Age	Age Group	Start date
Capital to Capital	Monte Carlo, Monaco - Andorra	Solo	Standard	61	Men 60-69	2015-10-09
Capital to Capital	Monte Carlo, Monaco - San Marino	Solo	Standard	60	Men 60-69	2014-03-08
Cross country	Italy E-W	Solo	Standard	59	Men 50-59	2013-03-09
Cross country	Italy W-E	Solo	Standard	58	Men 50-59	2012-03-10
Cross State	Florida E-W	Solo	Standard	60	Men 60-69	2014-01-18
Cross State	Florida W-E	Solo	Standard	58	Men 50-59	2012-01-14
Distance	100 Mile Indoor Velodrome	Solo	Standard	63	Men 60-69	2017-03-18
Distance	200 Mile Indoor Velodrome	Solo	Standard	63	Men 60-69	2017-03-18
Distance	1000 km Indoor Velodrome	Solo	Standard	63	Men 60-69	2017-03-18
Timed	6 Hour Indoor Velodrome	Solo	Standard	63	Men 60-69	2017-03-18
Timed	12 Hour Indoor Velodrome	Solo	Standard	63	Men 60-69	2017-03-18
Timed	24 Hour Indoor Velodrome	Solo	Standard	63	Men 60-69	2017-03-18

== Personal life ==
Valerio Zamboni resides in Monaco with his wife, Alessandra Soncini, whom he married in March 2008.
