= Bharat Pannu =

Bharat Pannu is an Indian cyclist and a Lieutenant colonel of the Indian Army. Pannu is the first Indian to win podium place in any international cycling race. He also holds world records for "fastest time to travel the Golden Quadrilateral by bicycle", "fastest time to cycle trans-India from west to east" and "fastest cycle journey from Manali to Leh".

== Career ==
He serves as the Electronics and Mechanical Engineer Officer in the Indian Army, and is posted to the Aviation Test Team. He has cycled across Austria and the United States. He has also completed in Race Across America. He paddled 4,086 km in 12 days. He completed Race Around Austria in four days. He has rode from Kashmir to Kanyakumari in 8 days.

== Personal life ==
He was born on 8 May 1983 in Rohtak district to Ram Mehar Singh, a retired Indian Army Subedar.
