= Conrad Will =

Conrad Will may refer to:

- Conrad Will (politician) (1779–1835), American physician, politician, and pioneer
- Conrad Will (triathlete) (1941–2002), American early pioneer in the sport of triathlon
