= Allen Larsen =

American cyclist

Allen Larsen is an American ultramarathon cyclist from Cle Elum, Washington who won the Race Across America.

In 2002, Allen raced in RAAM for the first time. Despite incredible obstacles, like his neck failing halfway through the race, he won third place. His determination and perseverance won him Rookie of the Year.

He won the 2003 Race Across America (RAAM) at a time of 8 days 23 h 36 min. He accomplished this time by sleeping for no more than three hours at a time. This was only his second time competing in the event. This was the last time the race was won by an American.

For the 2005 RAAM, he was a crew chief.

Allen Larsen is a firm Christian, having had theme Bible verses while racing.
