= Ultraman (endurance challenge) =

Triathlon

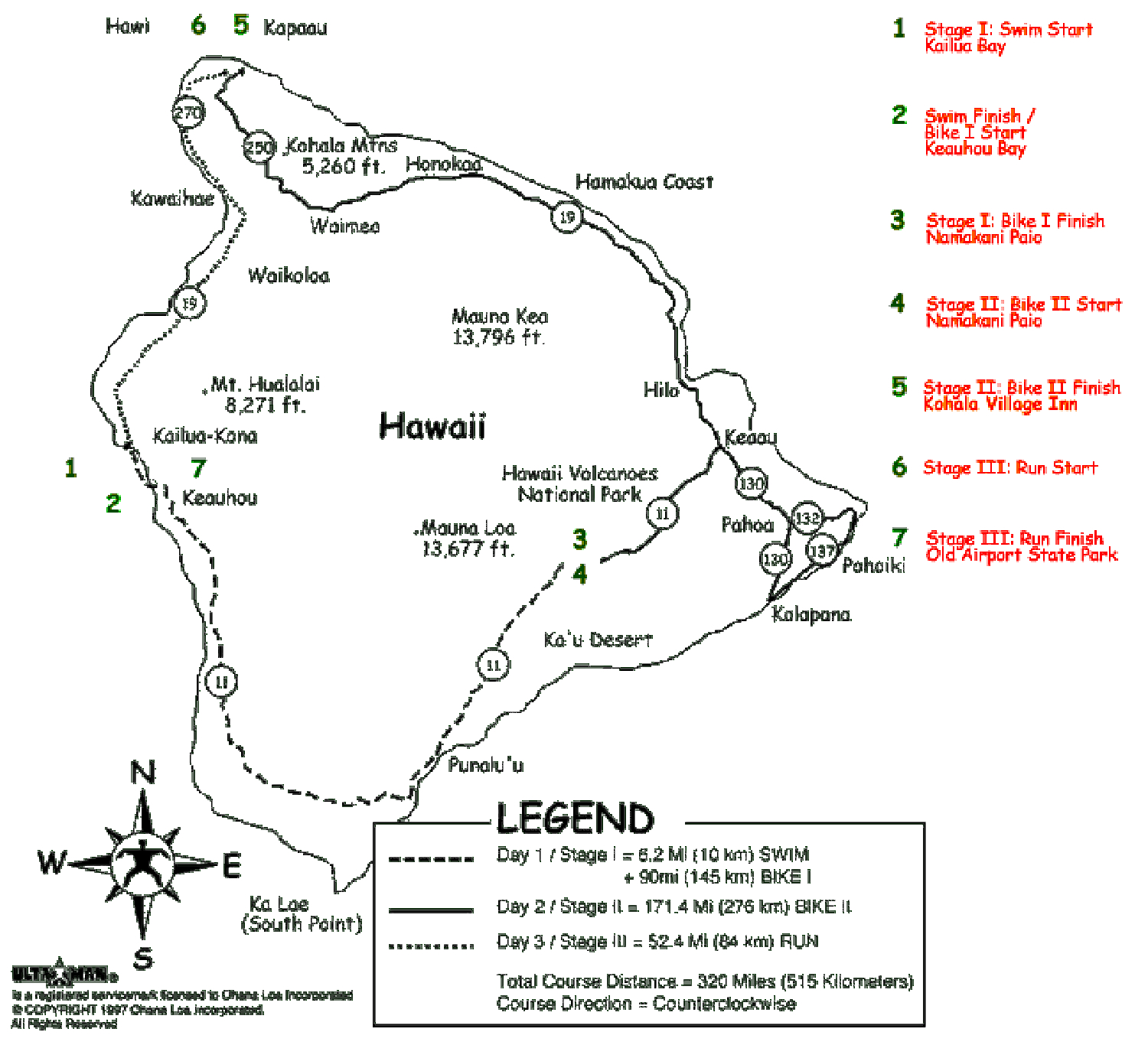
Hawaii course map

Ultraman is a three-day, 515 km (320 mile) multisport race modelled on the one held annually on the Big Island of Hawaii which is now called the Ultraman World Championship. "Ultraman" is a branding for events affiliated with the Hawaii original. Each race is divided into three stages over three days: The first is a 6.2-mile (10-km) ocean swim from Kailua Bay to Keauhou Bay, followed by a 90-mile (145-km) cross-country bike ride, with vertical climbs that total 6,000 feet. Stage two is a 171.4-mile (276-km) bike ride from Volcanoes National Park to Kohala Village Inn in Hawi, with total vertical climbs of 4,000 feet. Stage three is a 52.4-mile (84-km) double-marathon, which starts at Hawi and finishes on the beach at the Old Kona Airport State Recreation Area. Each stage must be completed within 12 hours or less. The swim portion of stage one must be completed in 5.5 hours or less. Competitors who do not reach the finish lines within the time limits are disqualified, but encouraged to continue racing each day as participants.

This event attracts athletes who seek to explore the extreme in physical and mental abilities. The race is limited to 40 athletes on an invitation-only basis and attracts participants from around the world, including Argentina, Brazil, Canada, Italy, Mexico, Puerto Rico, Spain, Sweden, Slovenia and the United States. Racers must have reached their 20th birthday prior to the start of stage one. Each racer must be accompanied by an individual support team of at least two people over the entire course. Many support team members are volunteers from the Big community.

== History ==
The first Ultraman Triathlon was held in 1983 and organized by Curtis Tyler, Alex Smith, and Conrad Will. Among the group Curtis Tyler served as original race director with the goal of having more than just a competition but an event which focused on the guiding principles of Hawaiian culture.... "aloha" (love), "ohana" (family), and "kokua" (help). In 1992 Tyler turned over Ultraman to Jane Bockus on the condition that there never be prize money. Jane Bockus, often referred to as "Ultra Momma", has kept the event the same with the exception of a course change in the years 2001 & 2002 with a start and finish in Kailua-Kona instead of the around the Big Island format. In 2017, Ultra Momma handed over the reins to her Assistant RD, and Sheryl Cobb took over as Race Director, with her husband David as Assistant RD. In 2018, David Cobb was added as Co-Race Director along with Sheryl.

Popularity of the previous course remained for many years, and things changed little until the 2018 Kilauea eruption. During the eruption, lava covered part of the race course in the area of "Red Road", a favorite section of the Day 2 course. The 2018 course was altered to account for this course blockage: Day 1 became an out-and-back course, ending back at T1 in Keauhou Bay; Day 2 became a challenging ride from Kona up and over the "Saddle" before meeting up with the old course, ending at Kapaa Park near Hawi; Day 3 remained unchanged, running from Hawi back to Kona. For 2019, the Day 1 course will return to the old Kona to Volcano course. Day 2 will need to alter slightly to account for the lava on Red Road, but will start in Volcano and end in Hawi as usual, and Day 3 will remain the same.

In 1993, a second Ultraman was organized in Canada (Penticton, British Columbia) this event was brought to life by Steve Brown, who after dealing with the UMWC mgt changed the original event to Ultra520 which ran until covid and 2022 which served as a qualifier event to gain entrance to Ultraman World Championships in Hawaii until 2014. A third event, Ultraman United Kingdom began in 2011 and was held in Wales for three years. Ultraman Florida launched in the Orlando region in 2014. Ultraman Australia launched in 2015 and was held in Noosa for three years. Canada returned as a qualifier in July 2019 run by Brad Sawa and he was removed by the Cobbs in 2026, and Ultraman Arizona launched in March 2022 and folded by the cobbs in 2026.

We came together as strangers, competed as friends, we part as brothers and sisters.

— Gerry van de Wint

== Results ==
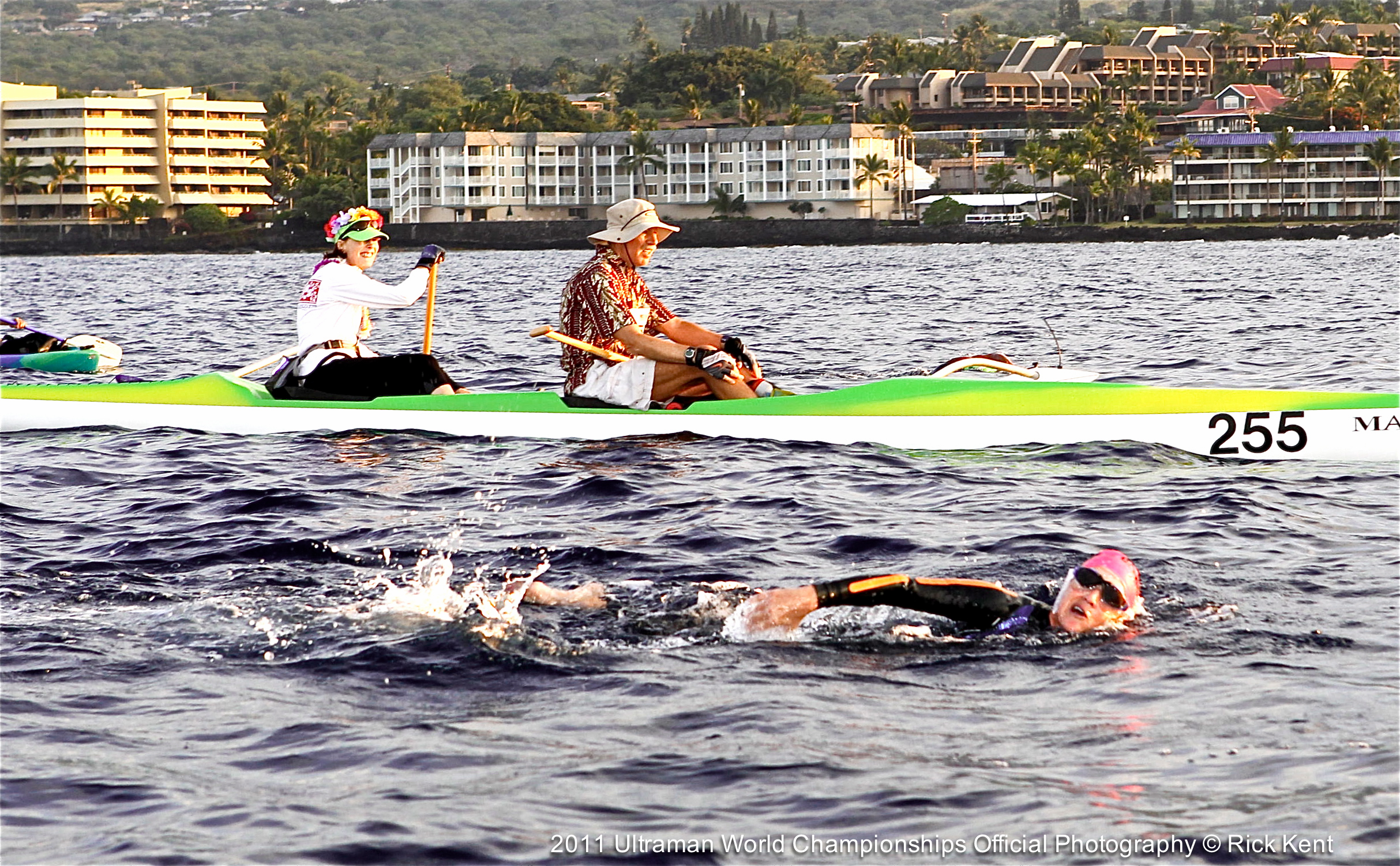
Ultraman swimmer off the coast of Kailua-Kona with escort

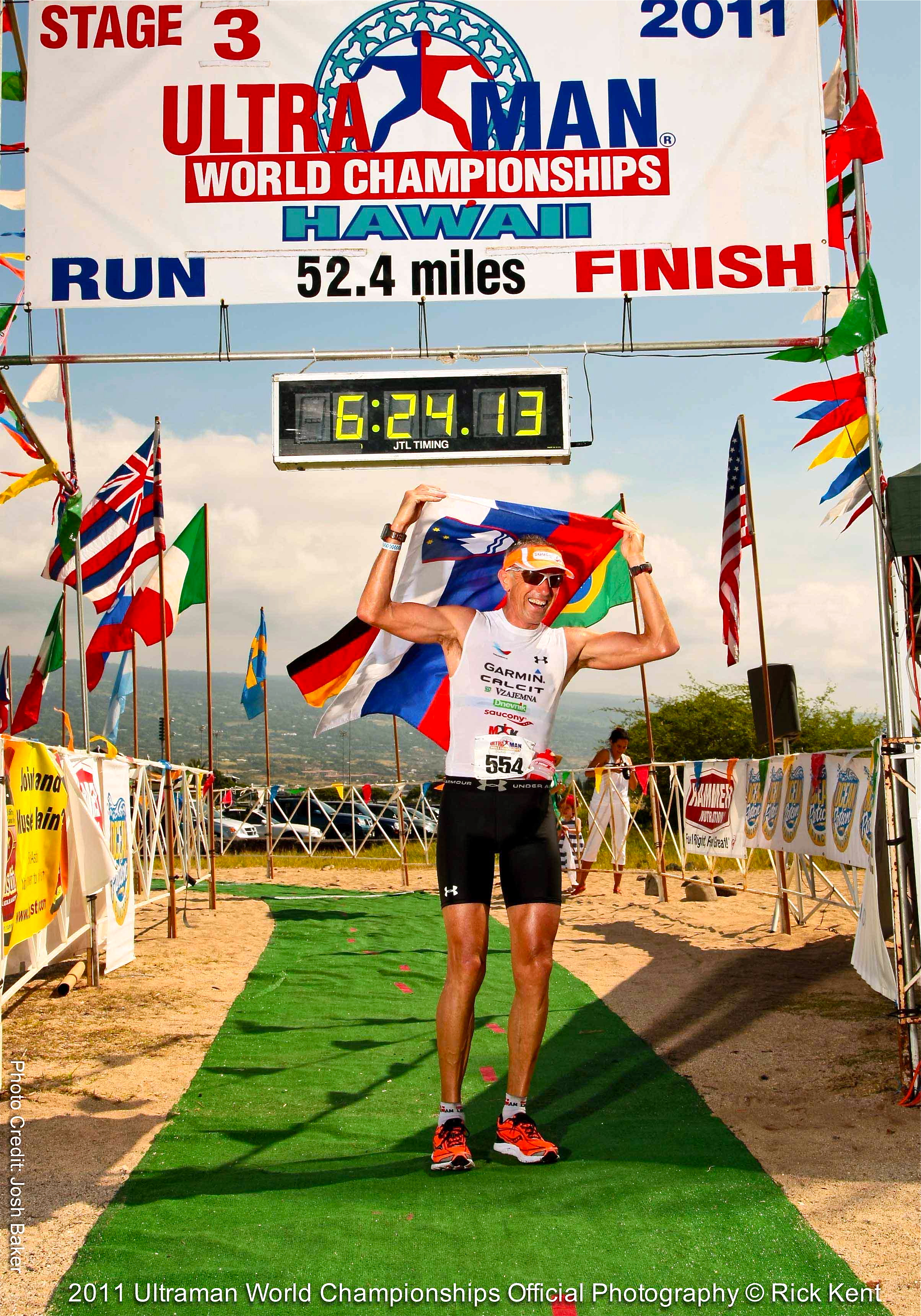
The fastest runners will complete the 52.4 mile double marathon under seven hours

Year	Sex	Place	Athlete	Age	Nationality	Time
1983	Men	1	Kurt Madden	28	United States	21:41:02
1983	Women	9 (overall)	Ardis Bow	27	United States	26:57:45
1984	Men	1	Scott Molina	24	United States	24:49:01
1984	Women	13 (overall)	Lyn Brooks	36	United States	33:15:24
1985	Men	1	Kurt Madden	30	United States	22:11:04
1985	Women	3 (overall)	Ardis Bow	29	United States	25:44:51
1986	Men	1	Jim Freim	40	United States	25:43:21
1986	Women	23 (overall)	Sherri Wellis	38	United States	33:31:19
1988	Men	1	Gary Shields	33	United States	24:42:01
1988	Women	18 (overall)	Manako Mizuntani	28	Japan	35:41:14
1989	Men	1	Gary Shields	34	United States	23:14:56
1989	Women	8 (overall)	Tina Bischoff	31	United States	25:45:51
1990	Men	1	Gary Shields	35	United States	22:19:16
1990	Women	25 (overall)	Angelika Castaneda	47	United States	31:27:45
1992	Men	1	Don Newman	33	United States	26:20:23
1992	Women	-	-	--		--:--:--
1993	Men	1	Hans-Juergen Schley	37	Germany	25:50:38
1993	Women	13 (overall)	Hiroe Fukushima	25	Japan	34:19:52
1994	Men	1	Daniel Schallmo	37	Germany	23:50:34
1994	Women	-	-	--		--:--:--
1995	Men	1	Kevin Cutjar	29	Australia	23:19:39
1995	Women	22 (overall)	Tracy Preston	25	Canada	32:25:37
1996	Men	1	Erik Seedhouse	32	Canada	22:51:36
1996	Women	-	-	--		---:--:--
1997	Men	1	Peter Kotland	25	United States	21:52:51
1997	Women	14 (overall)	Tracy Preston	27	Canada	34:08:00
1998	Men	1	Holger "Holgie" Spiegel	26	Germany	21:41:22
1998	Women	19 (overall)	Tracy Preston	28	Canada	30:53:03
1999	Men	1	John Nickles	35	United States	22:46:27
1999	Women	17 (overall)	Linda Bialla	36	United States	29:19:00
2000	Men	1	Uros Velepec	34	Slovenia	22:15:08
2000	Women	10 (overall)	Monica Fernandez	33	Guatemala	28:08:09
2001	Men	1	Uros Velepec	34	Slovenia	22:44:30
2001	Women	10 (overall)	Monica Fernandez	33	Guatemala	27:56:54
2002	Men	1	Gordo Byrn	33	New Zealand	23:24:56
2002	Women	12 (overall)	Conny Dauben	27	Germany	28:32:59
2003	Men	1	Alexandre Ribeiro	38	Brazil	22:20:26
2003	Women	6 (overall)	Shanna Armstrong	29	United States	27:31:51
2004	Men	1	Jonas Colting	31	Sweden	21:41:49
2004	Women	16 (overall)	Lauren Fithian	46	United States	32:03:16
2005	Men	1	Alexandre Ribeiro	40	Brazil	24:32:28
2005	Women	4 (overall)	Shanna Armstrong	31	United States	28:03:34
2006	Men	1	Jeff Landauer	39	United States	24:30:47
2006	Women	9 (overall)	Shanna Armstrong	32	United States	28:13:11
2007	Men	1	Jonas Colting	34	Sweden	21:59:44
2007	Women	8 (overall)	Shanna Armstrong	32	United States	26:43:24
2008	Men	1	Alexandre Ribeiro	43	Brazil	21:49:38
2008	Women	10 (overall)	Shanna Armstrong	34	United States	26:25:03
2009	Men	1	Alexandre Ribeiro	44	Brazil	22:10:12
2009	Women	7 (overall)	Shanna Armstrong	35	United States	25:48:46
2010	Men	1	Mike Le Roux	34	Australia	21:55:57
2010	Women	5 (overall)	Amber Monforte	32	United States	24:07:11
2011	Men	1	Alexandre Ribeiro	46	Brazil	22:09:54
2011	Women	6 (overall)	Amber Monforte	33	United States	24:42:02
2012	Men	1	Alexandre Ribeiro	47	Brazil	22:51:12
2012	Women	3 (overall)	Amber Monforte	34	United States	25:29:09
2013	Men	1	Miro Kregar	51	Slovenia	23:42:07
2013	Women	3 (overall)	Hillary Biscay	35	United States	24:30:50
2014	Men	1	Tobias Winnemoeller	35	Germany	23:28:14
2014	Women	7 (overall)	Yasuko Miyazaki	37	Japan	25:40:49
2015	Men	1	Mike Coughlin	42	Canada	21:44:18
2015	Women	15 (overall)	Staci Studer	42	United States	28:29:28
2016	Men	1	Inaki De La Parra	33	Mexico	22:34:18
2016	Women	6 (overall)	Kate Bevilaqua	39	Australia	24:44:04
2017	Men	1	Rob Gray	41	United States	22:19:49
2017	Women	9 (overall)	Steffi Steinberg	36	Germany	26:02:27

== Ultraman Events ==
As of June 2020, there are four existing Ultraman Triathlons. Ultraman Florida, Ultraman Canada and Ultraman Arizona all serve as qualifiers for Ultraman World Championships

- Ultraman World Championships, held on the big island of Hawaii on Thanksgiving weekend at the end of November; Started in 1983.
- Ultraman Florida, held in the central region of the state of Florida; Started in 2014.
- Ultraman Canada, held in Penticton, British Columbia, started in July 2019 (course records)
- Ultraman Arizona, held in Phoenix; started in March 2022 (original date of March 2020 postponed due to the COVID-19 pandemic).

== Gallery ==
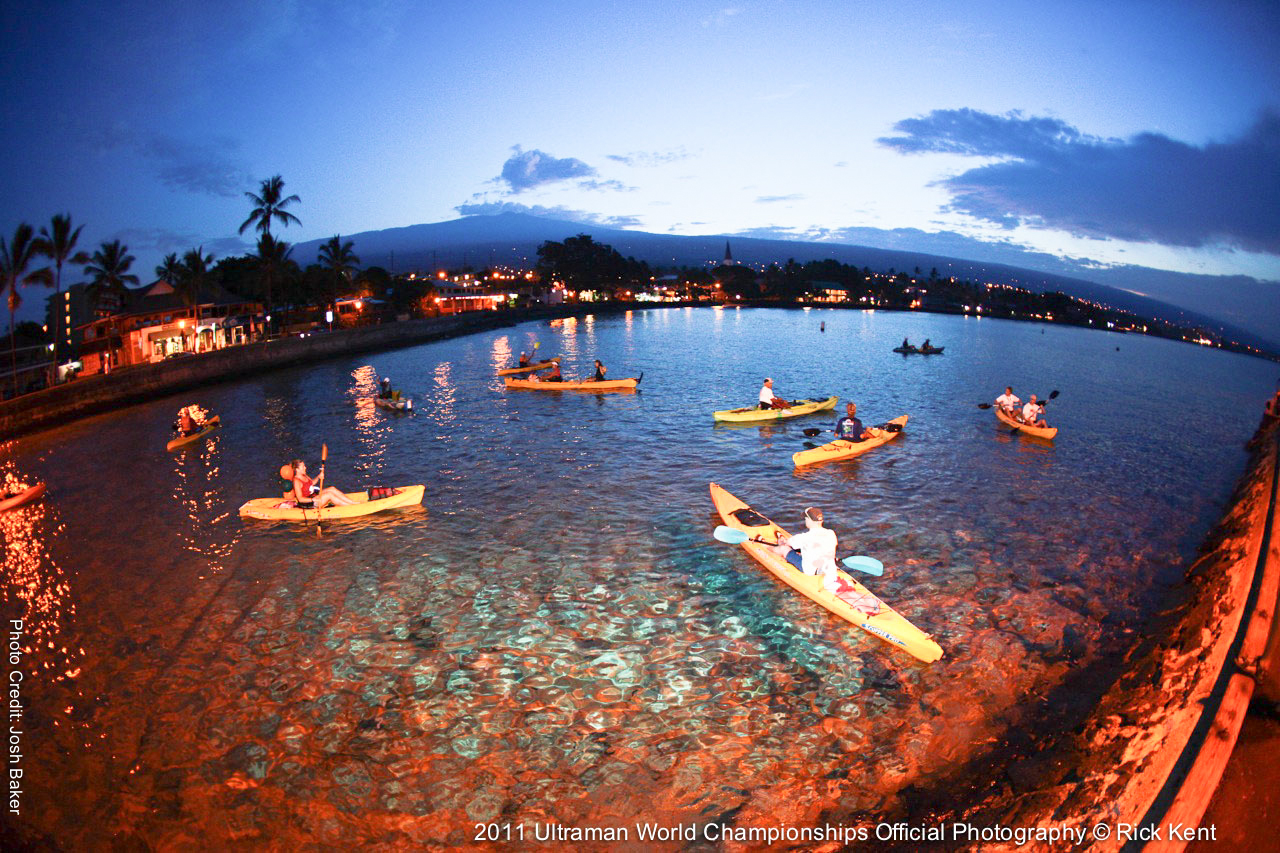
Swim escorts prior to Stage One 6.2 mile swim at Kaiakeakua Beach

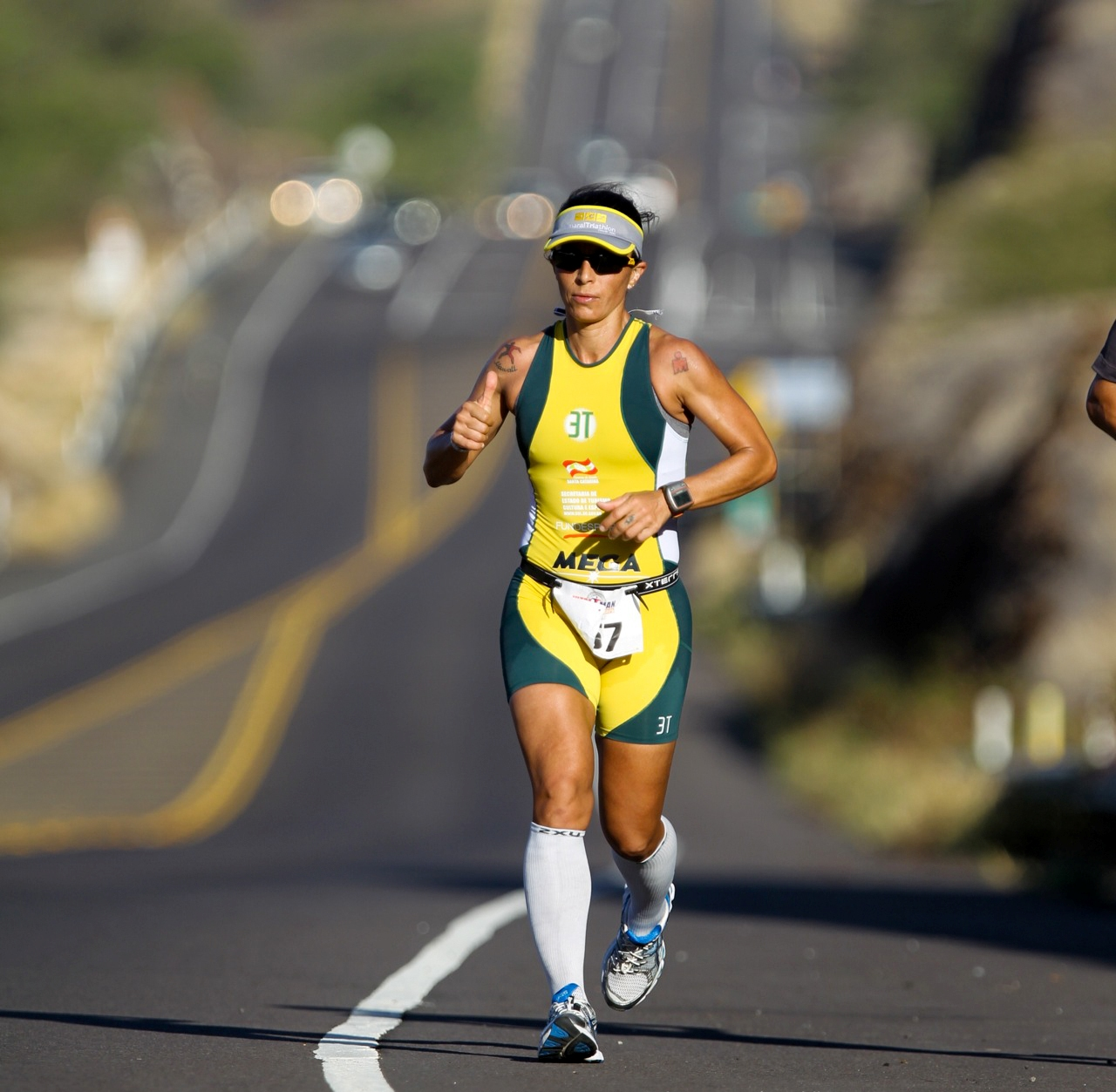
The Stage Three 52.4 miles is mostly run on the Queen Kaahumanu "Queen K" Highway which must be completed in under 12 hours

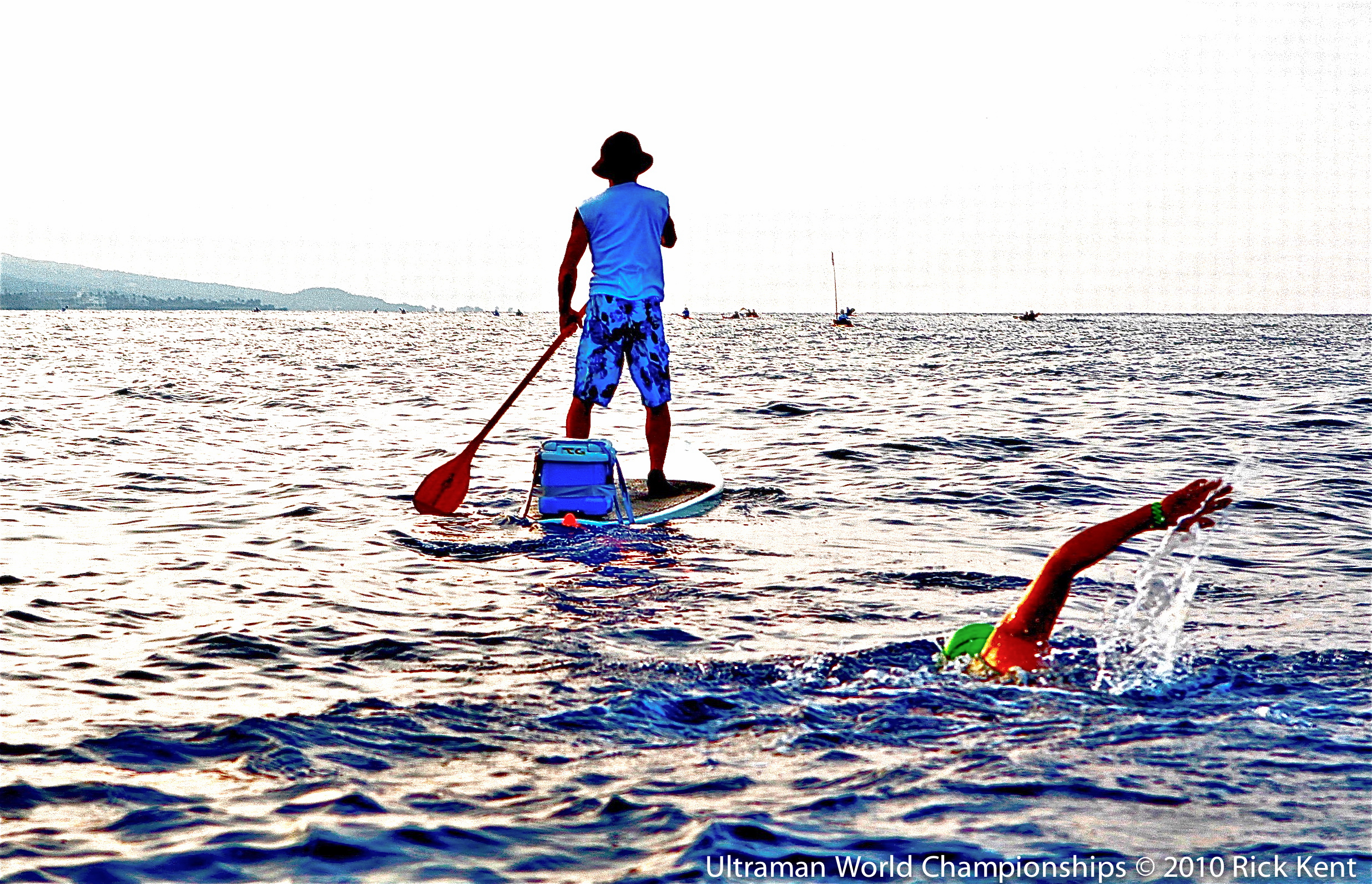
Swimmer with required escort

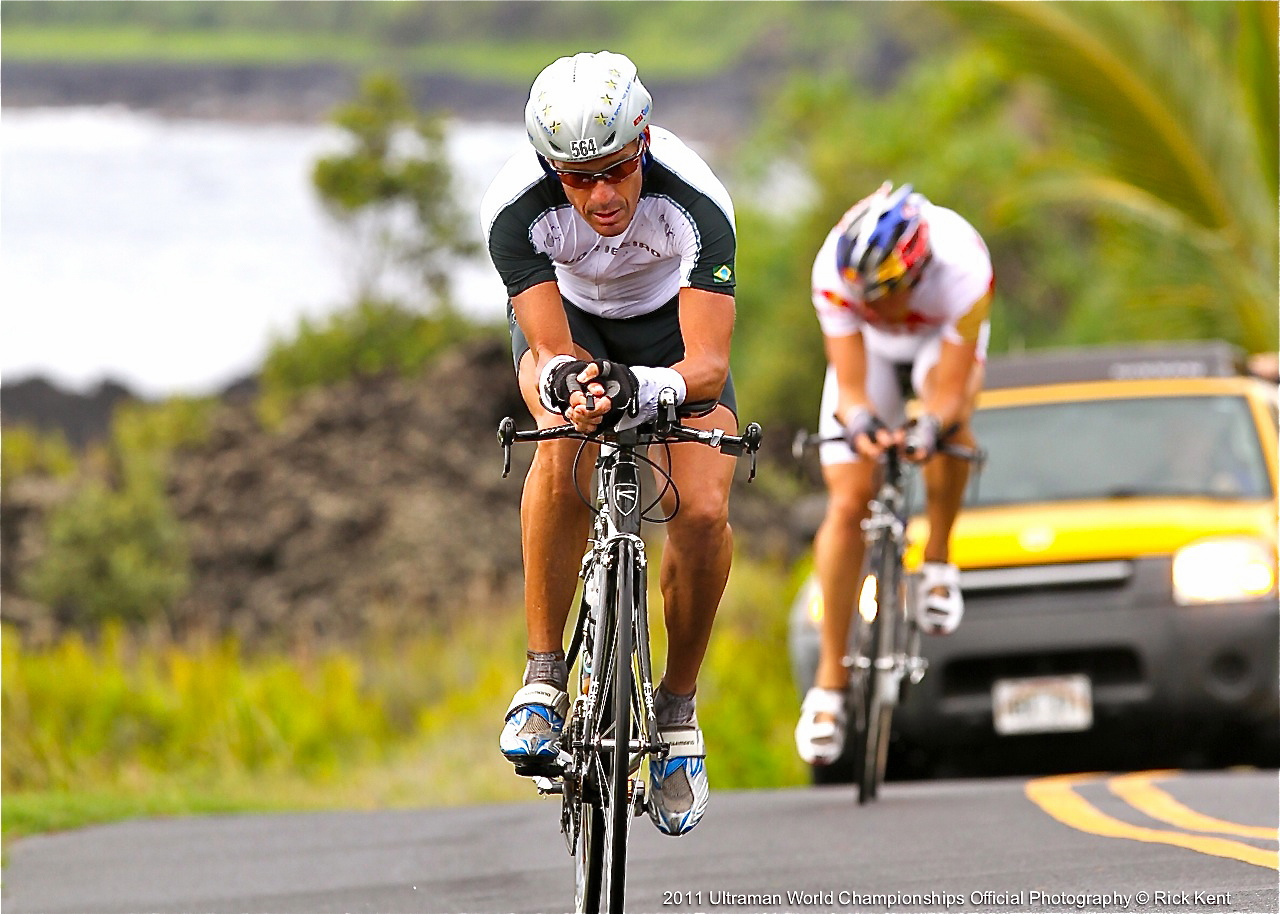
Frontrunners of Stage Two 171 mile bike followed by a media vehicle along the Red Road

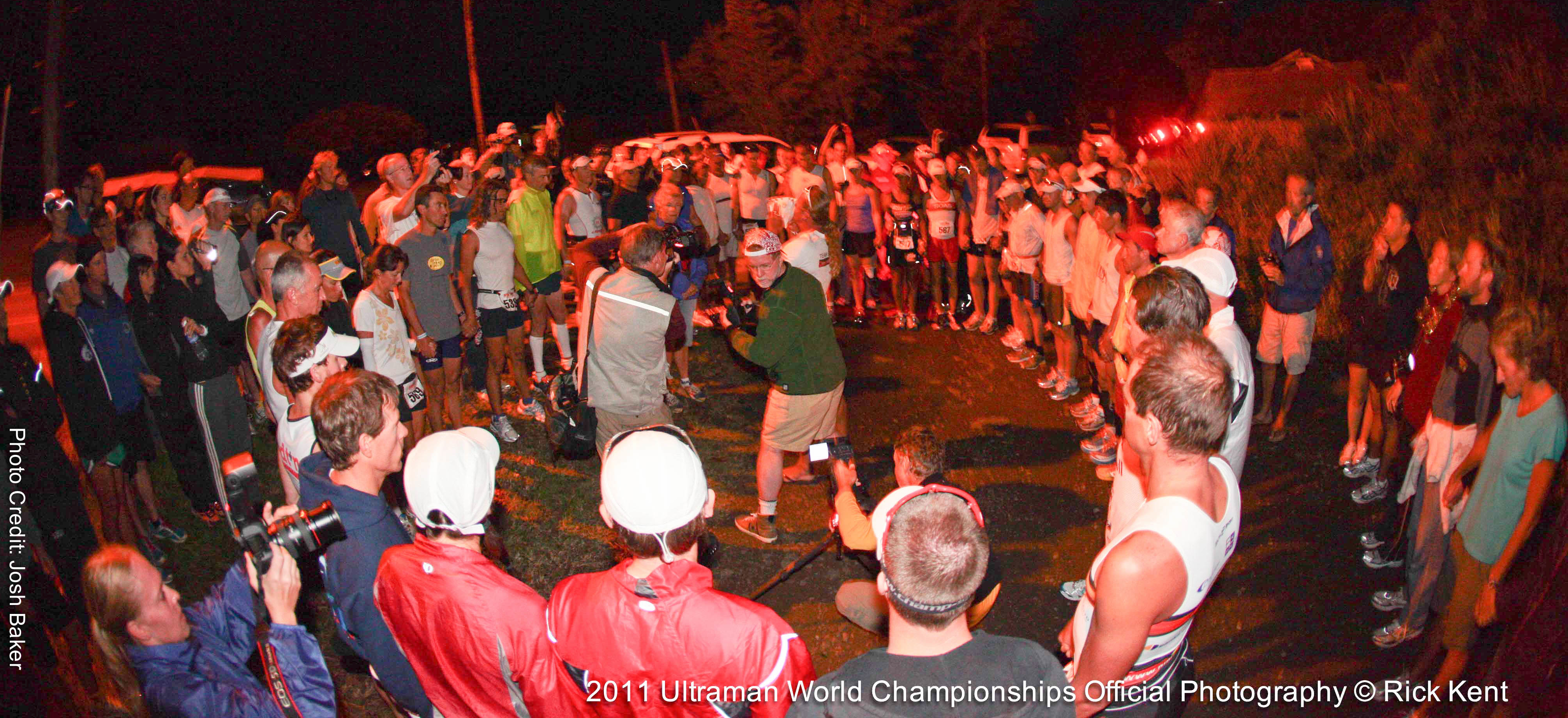
Participants gather in a circle with support crews and staff in an outer circle before 52.4 mile run

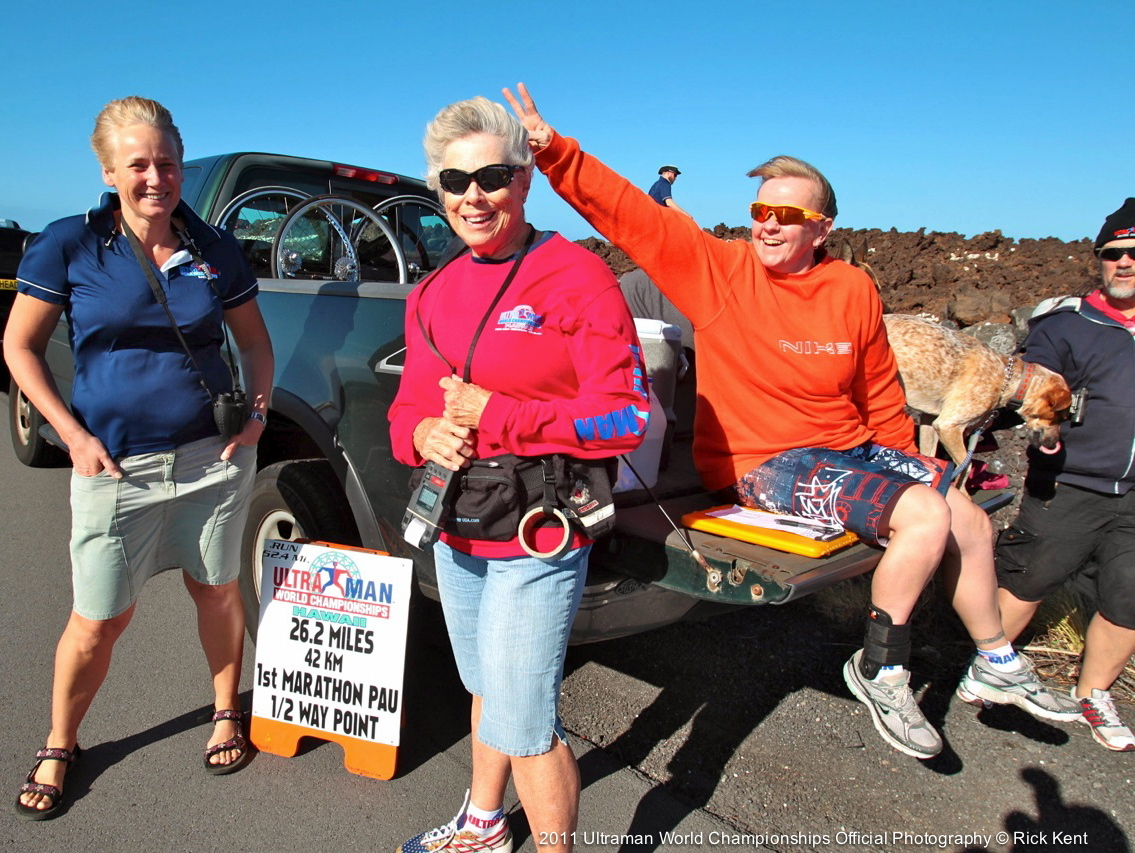
Ruth Wildman, Ultra Momma Jane Bockus, Race Directors Sheryl Cobb and Dave Cobb

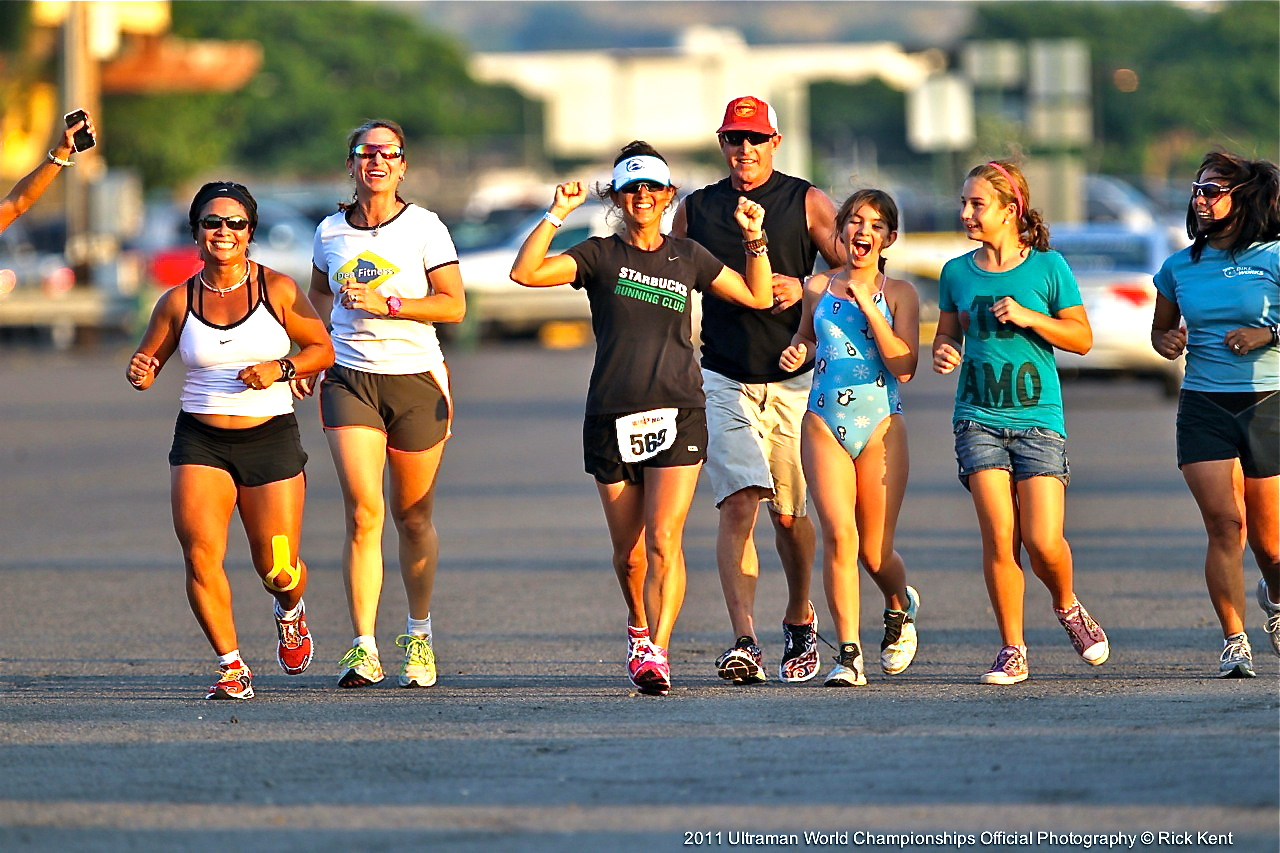
Final stretch of 52.4 mile run at the old airport. Participants frequently complete the journey with family, friends, and support crew

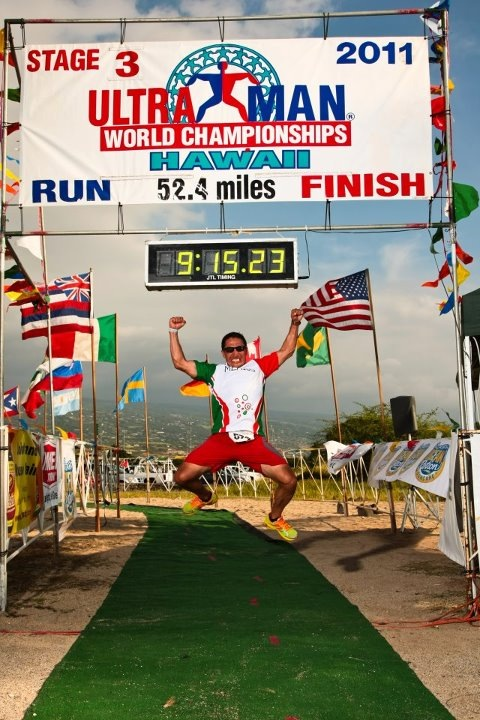
The energy of finishing an Ultraman

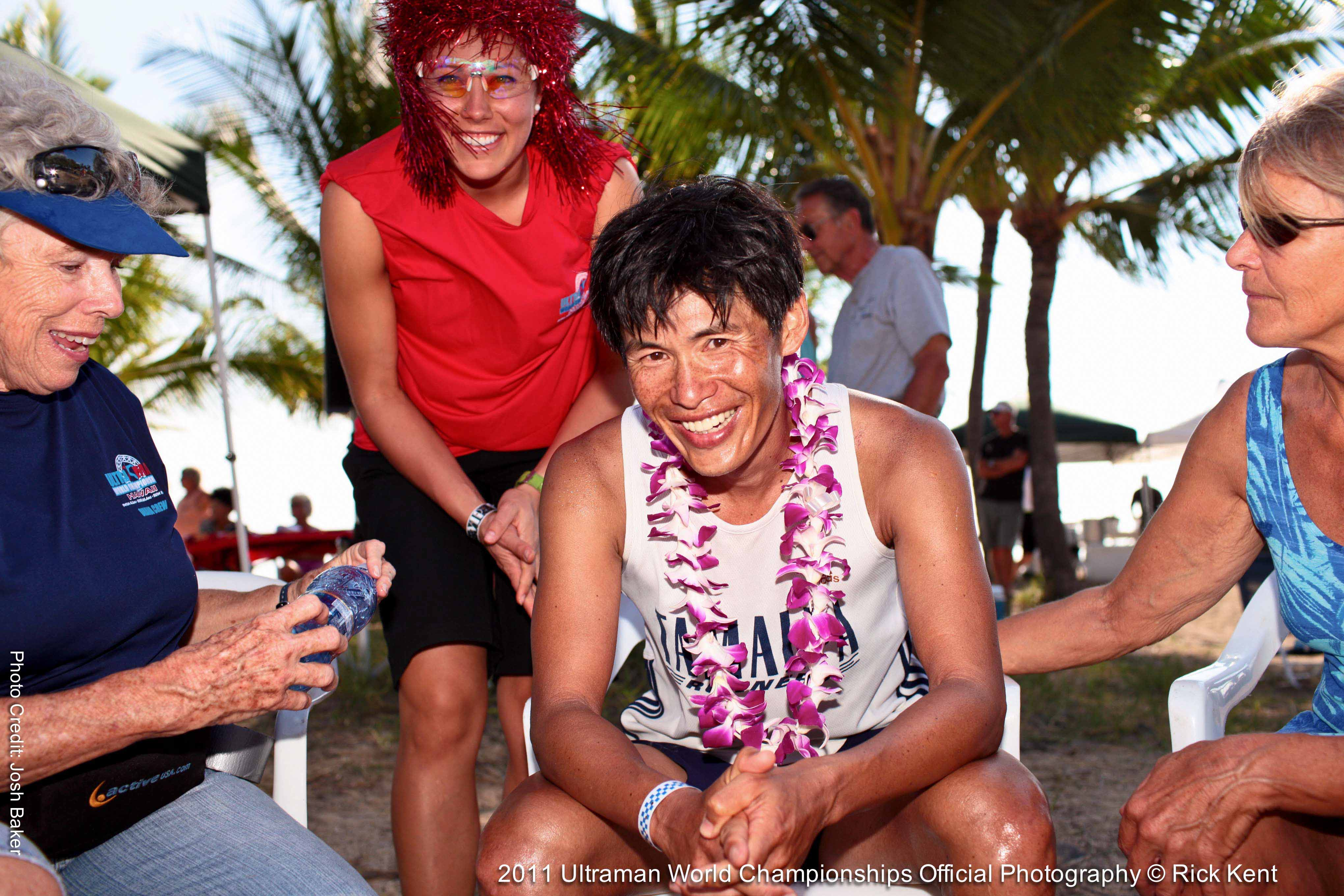
Finishers are awarded a lei from Jane Bockus

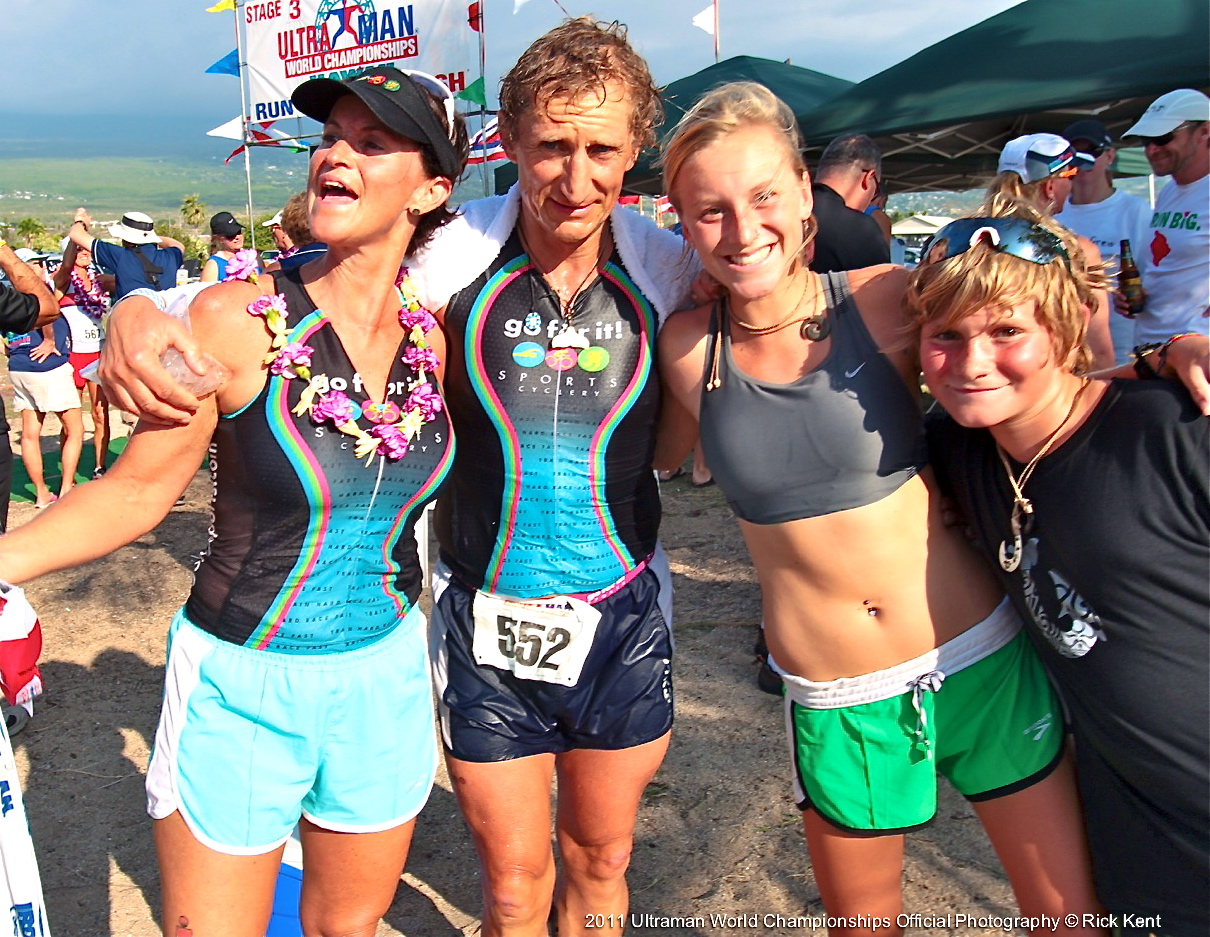
Some participants use family members for support crew adding to the ohana

== See also ==
- Ironman Triathlon
- Ultra-Triathlon
- Long-distance swimming
- Ultramarathon
- USA Triathlon
