= Pete Penseyres =

American cyclist

Cycling career
- Sport: Cycling
- Discipline: Ultra-distance
- Role: Rider

Major wins
- 1st, Race Across America (1984, 1986)

Pete Penseyres is an American cyclist who was the winner of Race Across America (RAAM) in 1984 and 1986, setting a world record of 3,107 miles (5,000 km) in 8 days, 9 hours, and 47 minutes. His average speed of 15.40 miles per hour (24.78 km/h) was the record for 27 years, finally being broken by Christoph Strasser in 2013, who averaged 15.58 miles per hour (25.07 km/h). Penseyres trained for years by cycling 65 miles (105 km) to work each day.

Penseyres's performance is particularly remarkable for several reasons. The RAAM is continuous from start to finish with no breaks; Penseyres was notable for his ability to forgo sleep to improve his time. Equipment at the time was primitive by today's standards: Penseyres introduced the use of aerobars to mimic a downhill skier's wind resistance advantage. Nutrition during the race was also not nearly as advanced as it is today.
