= Wolfgang Fasching =

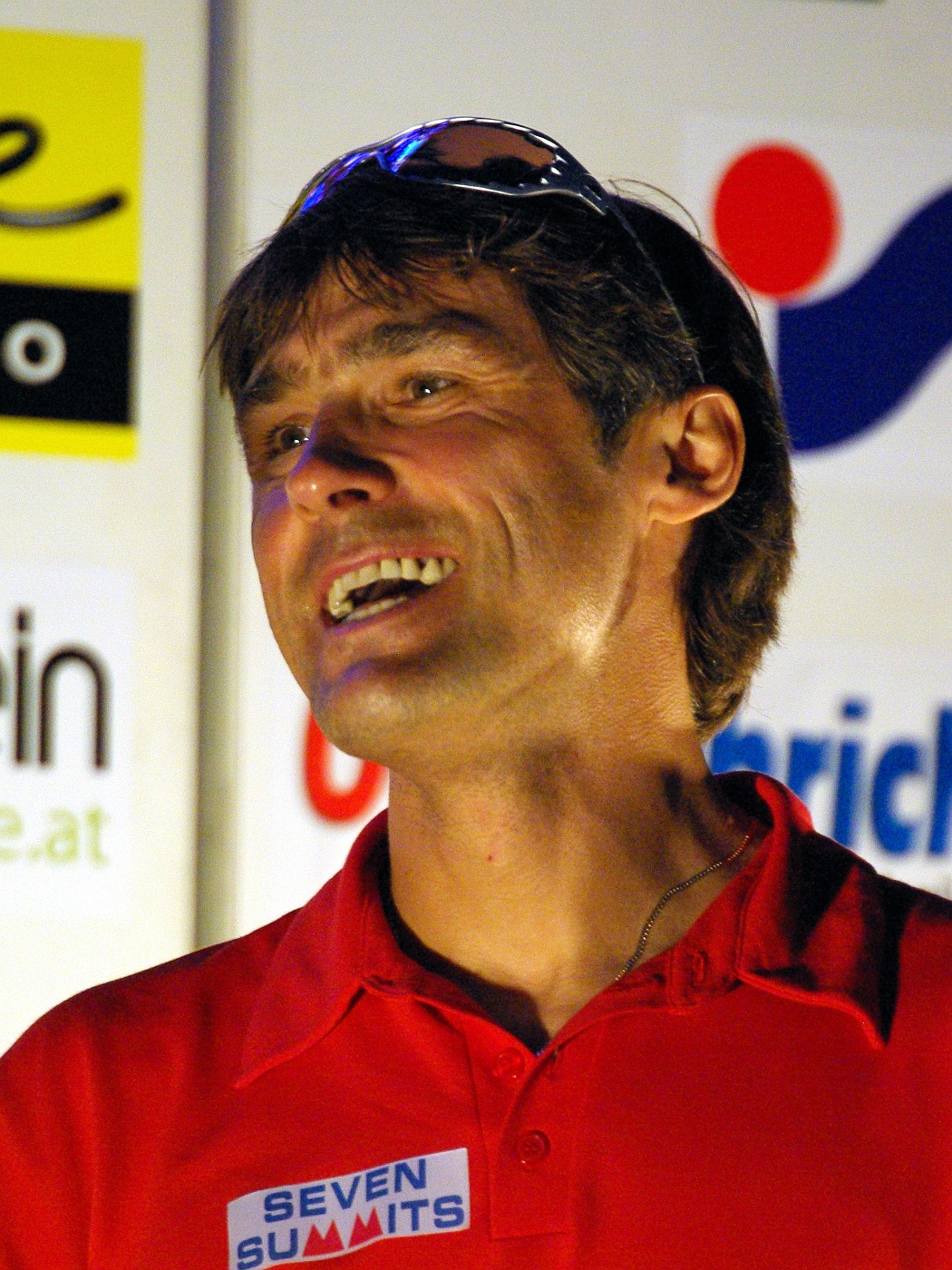
- Fasching in 2008

Personal information
- Full name: Wolfgang Fasching
- Born: 11 August 1967 (age 59)

Cycling career
- Sport: Cycling

Wolfgang Fasching (born August 11, 1967) is a three-time winner of the Race Across America (RAAM). Following his cycling career, Fasching became a mountaineer, author, and motivational speaker.

2011 RAAM winner and fellow Austrian Christoph Strasser has stated that his decision to begin ultra cycling was inspired by Fasching, and Fasching has subsequently mentored Strasser.
