= Toti Fernández =

Mónica Toti Fernández
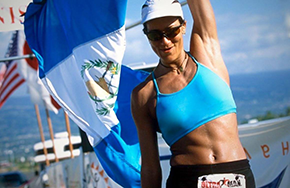

Personal information
- Native name: Mónica Fernández Robles
- Nickname: Toti Fernández
- Nationality: Guatemala, Guatemala
- Born: 18 de marzo de 1968
- Height: 1.74 m (5 ft 9 in)
- Website: www.totifernandez.com

Sport
- Country: Guatemala
- Sport: Triatlón y Ultramaratón
- Updated on 17 August 2016

Mónica Fernández, better known as Toti Fernández (born in Guatemala City on March 18, 1968) is a triathlete and ultramarathon runner, lecturer, author, entrepreneur and mother. She won the 2000 and 2001 Ultraman events.

== Biography ==
=== Birth and childhood ===
Toti Fernández was born in Guatemala City on March 18, 1968, the youngest of 6 siblings. When she was only ten years old, both her parents died of lung cancer: first her mother, and eight months later, her father.

=== Early years ===
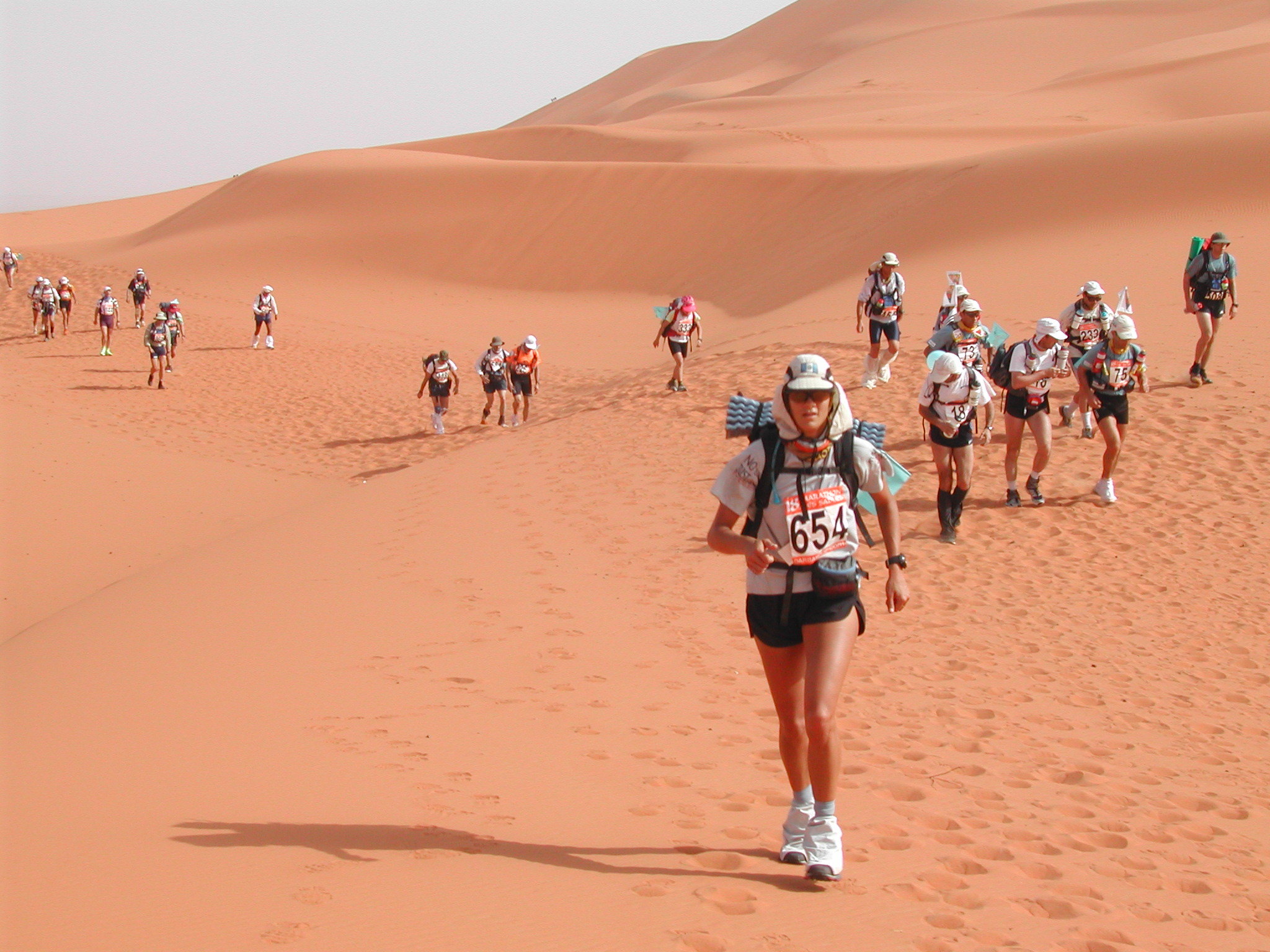
Toti Fernández at the Marathon Des Sables in the Sahara Desert.

Toti’s life changed drastically when she had to move to Mexico City to live with her father’s sister, who became her tutor. Having to live in 17 different houses and invaded by rebelliousness, she started smoking when she was only 16 and became a heavy smoker of two packs a day. At age 22, she took up swimming to counter for the harmful effects of tobacco and quit smoking when she found her true passion: triathlon.

=== Sports career ===
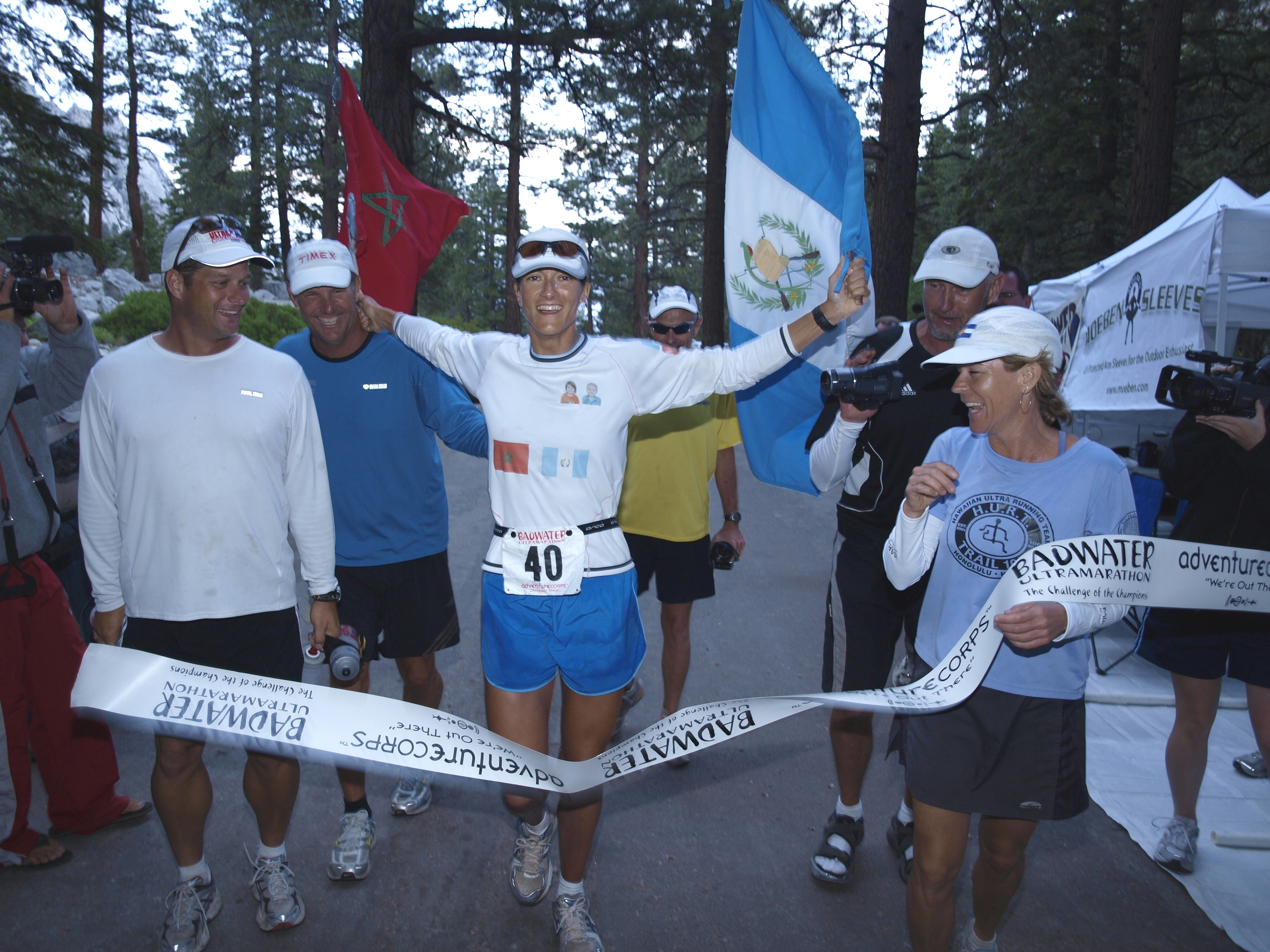
Mónica "Toti" Fernández at the finish line, Badwater Ultramarathon, 2008.

After participating in several triathlon races, both sprint and Olympic, Toti participated in her first Ironman, becoming the first Guatemalan female to finish this race (Hawaii, 1997).

Seeking further challenges and longer distances, Toti registered for an Ultraman competition, a three-day triathlon that circles the island of Kona, the largest island in Hawaii. After becoming a two-time Ultraman world champion in 2000 y 2001, Toti decided to train for ultra marathons.

She has participated in three of the ten toughest races in the world, as classified by National Geographic: the Marathon des Sables, Badwater and Furnace Creek 508, now called Silver State 508.

Toti was the second placed woman and twelfth overall at the Death Valley Cup, a double race consisting of Badwater and Furnace Creek 508 during the same calendar year.

== Awards ==
Competition	Put	Place	Year
Death Valley Cup	Second Woman	United States	2008
Furnace Creek 508, 819 km of cycling non-stop	Second	United States	2008
Badwater Ultramarathon, 217 km non-stop	Seventh	United States	2008
Ironman Western Australia	Second	Australia	2007
Marathon Des Sables	Seventh	Morocco	2003
Leadville Ultramarathon	Seventh	United States	2002
Marathon Des Sables	Tenth	Morocco	2002
World-wide Ultraman World Championship	First	United States	2001
Ironman Canada		Canada	2001
World-wide Ultraman World Championship	First	United States	2000
Ironman Lake Placid		United States	2000
World-wide Ironman World Championship		United States	1998
Quelle Ironman Roth		Germany	1998
World-wide Ironman World Championship		United States	1997
Triathlon National Champion in olympic distance		Guatemala	1995
First Sprint Triathlon		Guatemala	1991

== Bibliography ==
Fernández, Mónica Toti (2015). 210,000 kilómetros. Autobiografía. ISBN 9789929644267.

Fernández, Mónica Toti (2015). 130,000 Miles. Autobiografía.
