= Conrad Will (triathlete) =

Conrad Will (July 29, 1941 – September 11, 2002) was one of the early pioneers in the sport of Triathlon. A member of the famed “San Diego Track Club” and “Horny Toads” running group in San Diego, California, he competed in some of the earliest triathlons in the late 1970s. In 1981 he participated in the Ironman Triathlon in its first year on the Big Island of Hawaii. He competed in Ironman Hawaii 6 times in his 40s and 50s. In 1984 he set a world record in the 40-49 age group at the Ultra Distance triathlon in Massachusetts. A few days later, he won the over 40 national title in the Long Course Triathlon in Colorado.

Outside of competition he was an even greater contributor to the sport of triathlon. He worked closely with Valerie Silk and the Ironman Triathlon to bring the sport to a larger audience and in 1983, he produced and directed the first ever Ironman “spin-off”, the Ricoh Ironman in Los Angeles. That same year he went on to create and co-found the annual three-day Ultraman (endurance challenge), also in Hawaii, which more than doubled the distances of the Ironman. In 1984 he was elected board president of the national governing body for the sport USA Triathlon, then called Tri-Fed. In his efforts to race faster, Mr. Will also invented and manufactured the QWIKFIL tire inflation device, which greatly reduced the time needed to repair a flat tire.
