= Christoph Strasser =

Austrian ultra cyclist

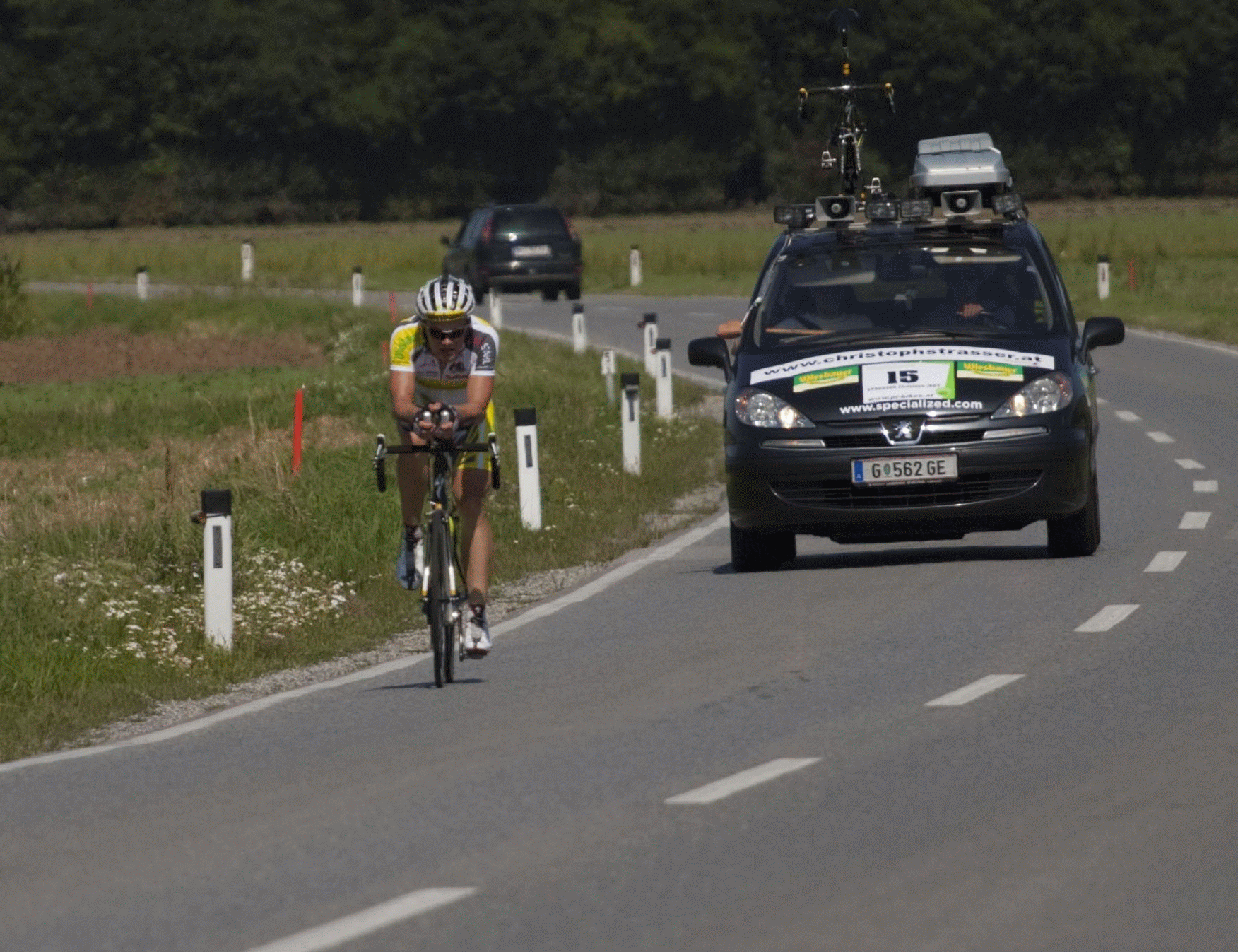
- Strasser in the Race Around Austria, 2010

Personal information
- Born: 4 November 1982 (age 43) Leoben, Austria

Cycling career
- Sport: Cycling

Christoph Strasser (born 4 November 1982 in Leoben, Austria) is an Austrian ultra cyclist who is a six-time winner and record holder for the fastest time in the Race Across America. From 16 to 17 July 2021, he became the first person to ride more than 1,000 kilometres (620 mi) in 24 hours, on a course at Hinterstoisser Air Base in Zeltweg, Austria.

== Career ==
In his youth Strasser was quite active and enjoyed sports such as football. At the age of 18 his interests shifted and he began to ride a mountain bike. In 2002 he took part in his first 24-hour cycling event. In 2005, at the age of 22, he became the youngest person to enter and complete the Race Across the Alps. In the following years he won several more 24-hour races and in 2007 he set a new Austrian record in 24-hour cycling events by riding 950 kilometres (590 mi) and at the age of 25 became the youngest Ultra World Champion. In 2009, on his first attempt, he qualified for the Race Across America but had to retire, when he was in 4th place, due to health problems after 2,400 kilometres (1,500 mi).

On 24 June 2011, Strasser became the third Austrian after Franz Spilauer and Wolfgang Fasching to win the Race Across America.

Strasser again won the Race Across America in 2013, finishing the race in 7 days, 22 hours, 11 minutes, at an average speed of 15.6 miles per hour (25.1 km/h) — a new race record. This was the fastest crossing of the USA by an individual.

In 2014, Strasser won and set yet another record at the Race Across America, completing the race in 7 days 15 hours 56 minutes, at an average speed of 16.42 miles per hour (26.43 km/h).

On 21 March 2015, Strasser set a new record for the most distance ridden on a road bike in 24 hours, riding 556.856 miles (896.173 km) at the former Tempelhof Airport in Berlin.

In January 2017, Strasser became the first person to cross Australia from Perth to Sydney in under 7 days, covering 3,950 km (2,454.94 miles) in 6 days, 10 hours, 58 minutes. He also broke the Austrian 48 hour road record of 1,248.04 km, set in 1938 by Sir Hubert Opperman, with a distance of 1,374 km; also the Australian records for 72, 96, 120, 144, and 168 hours, and for 1,000 km and 1,000 miles.

On 14 October 2017 Strasser, at the Tissot-Velodrome, at Grenchen in Switzerland, covered 941.872 kilometres (585.252 mi) in 24 hours, at an average speed of 39.25 kilometres per hour (24.39 mph). This feat gave Strasser the Guinness World Record for "Greatest distance cycled in 24 hours on an indoor track (WUCA) (male)".

On 22 June 2019, Strasser won his sixth Race Across America, finishing the rain-soaked race in 8 days, 6 hours and 51 minutes.

From 16 to 17 July 2021, he became the first person to ride more than 1,000 kilometres (620 mi) in 24 hours, on a course at Zeltweg Air Base. He achieved 1,026.215 kilometres (637.660 mi) with an average speed of 42.75 kilometres per hour (26.56 mph). According to his team, he also broke 11 other world records, for kilometer and mile distances of 100, 200, 300, 500 and for six, 12, and 24 hours.

== Personal life ==
Strasser currently lives in Graz, Austria.

== Achievements ==
- 2023 1st place - Transcontinental Race
- 2022 1st place - Transcontinental Race
- 2019 1st place - Race Across America
- 2018 1st place - Race Across America
- 2017 1st place - Race Across America
- 2014 1st place - Race Across America
- 2013 1st place - Race Across America
- 2012 2nd place - Race Across America
- 2012 1st place - DOS-RAS Extreme
- 2011 1st place - Race Across America
- 2011 3rd place - DOS-RAS Extreme
- 2010 1st place - Glocknerman - Ultra World Championship
- 2009 2nd place - 24h Race Le Mans
- 2007 1st place - Glocknerman - Ultra World Championship
