= Race Across America =

Long distance cycling competition in the US

The Race Across America, or RAAM, is an ultra-distance road cycling race across the United States that is held annually in June. It started in 1982 as an invitational event called the Great American Bike Race.

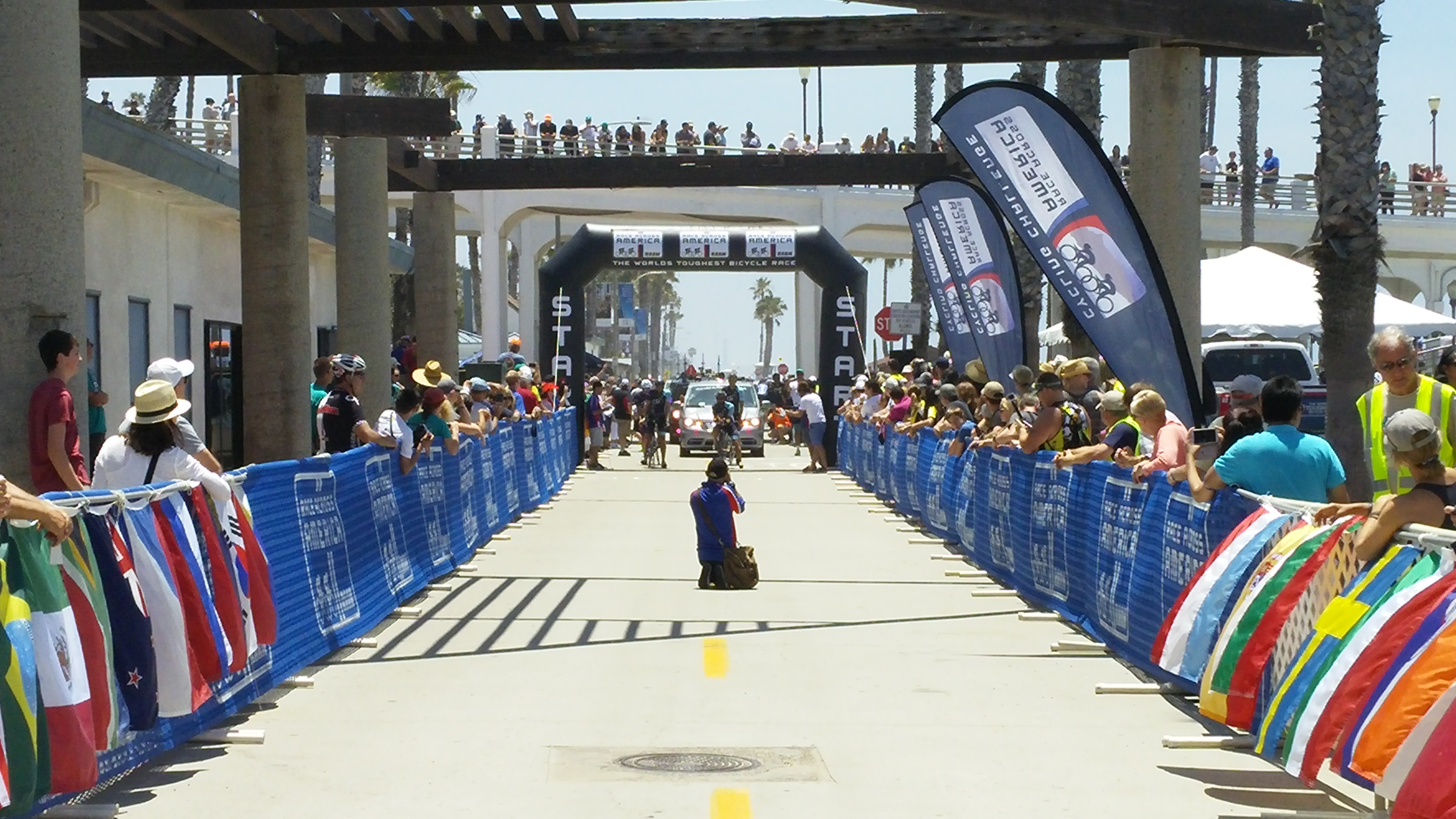
RAAM 2015 team start

RAAM is one of the longest annual endurance events in the world. All entrants must prove their abilities by competing in any of several qualifying events, completing a course within a specified time period.

RAAM is sometimes compared to the Tour de France, but the two races are fundamentally different. At its heart, RAAM is a transcontinental individual or team time trial, i.e., it is technically a nonstop event from start to finish, although solo riders do stop to rest occasionally. While the route has varied over the years, it has always been from the west coast to the east coast of the United States, approximately 3,000 miles (4,800 km), with the fastest solo competitors needing under 8 days to complete the course. By contrast, the Tour de France is a stage race contested by a large peloton of professional racers riding for sponsored teams. The route alternates between clockwise and counterclockwise discontinuous circuits around France and is generally about 2,200 miles long; the distance is divided into individual daily stages spread over the course of 23 days (including 2 rest days) and contested at much higher on-bike speeds than in RAAM.

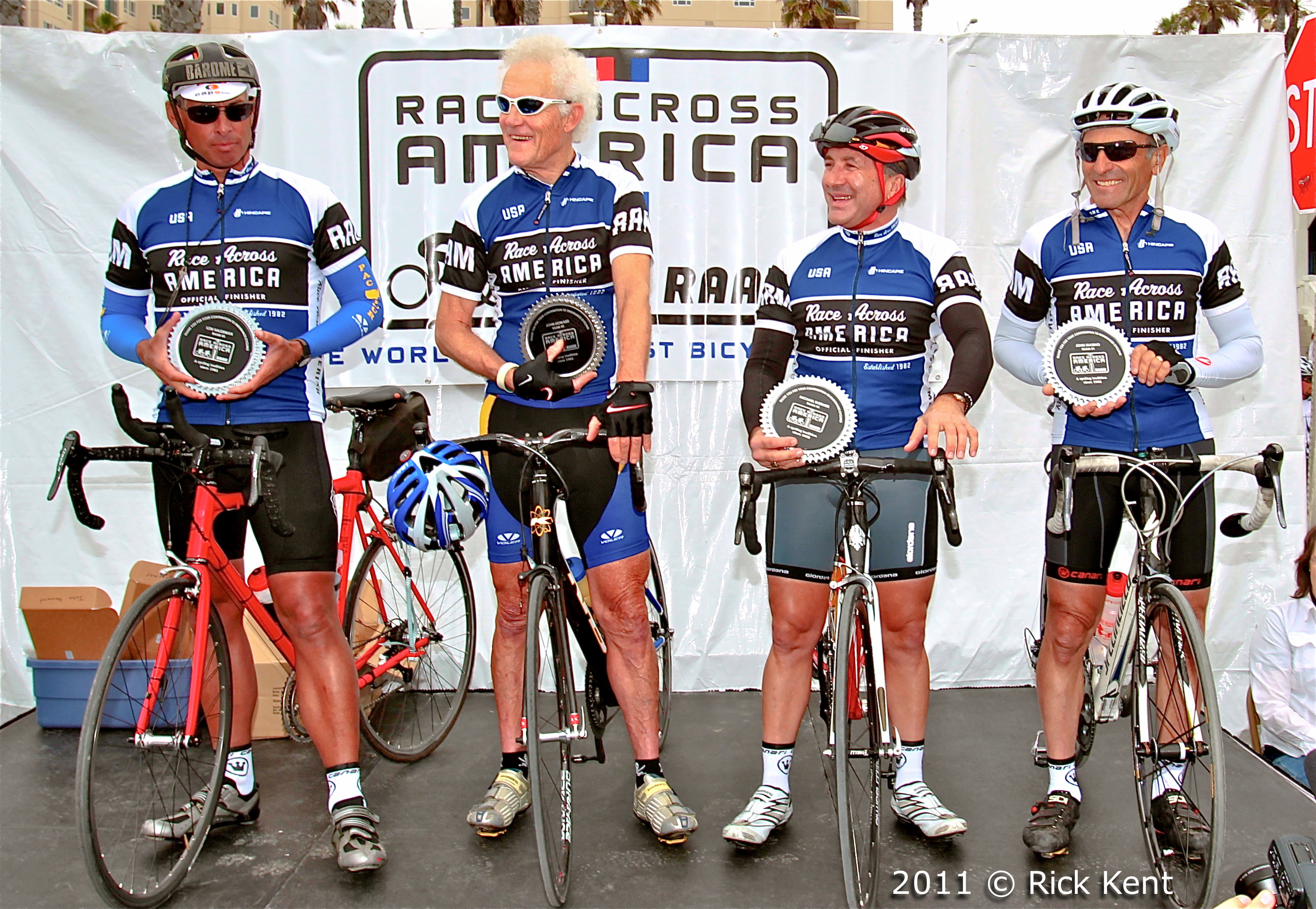
Lon Haldeman, John Howard, Michael Shermer, and founder John Marino

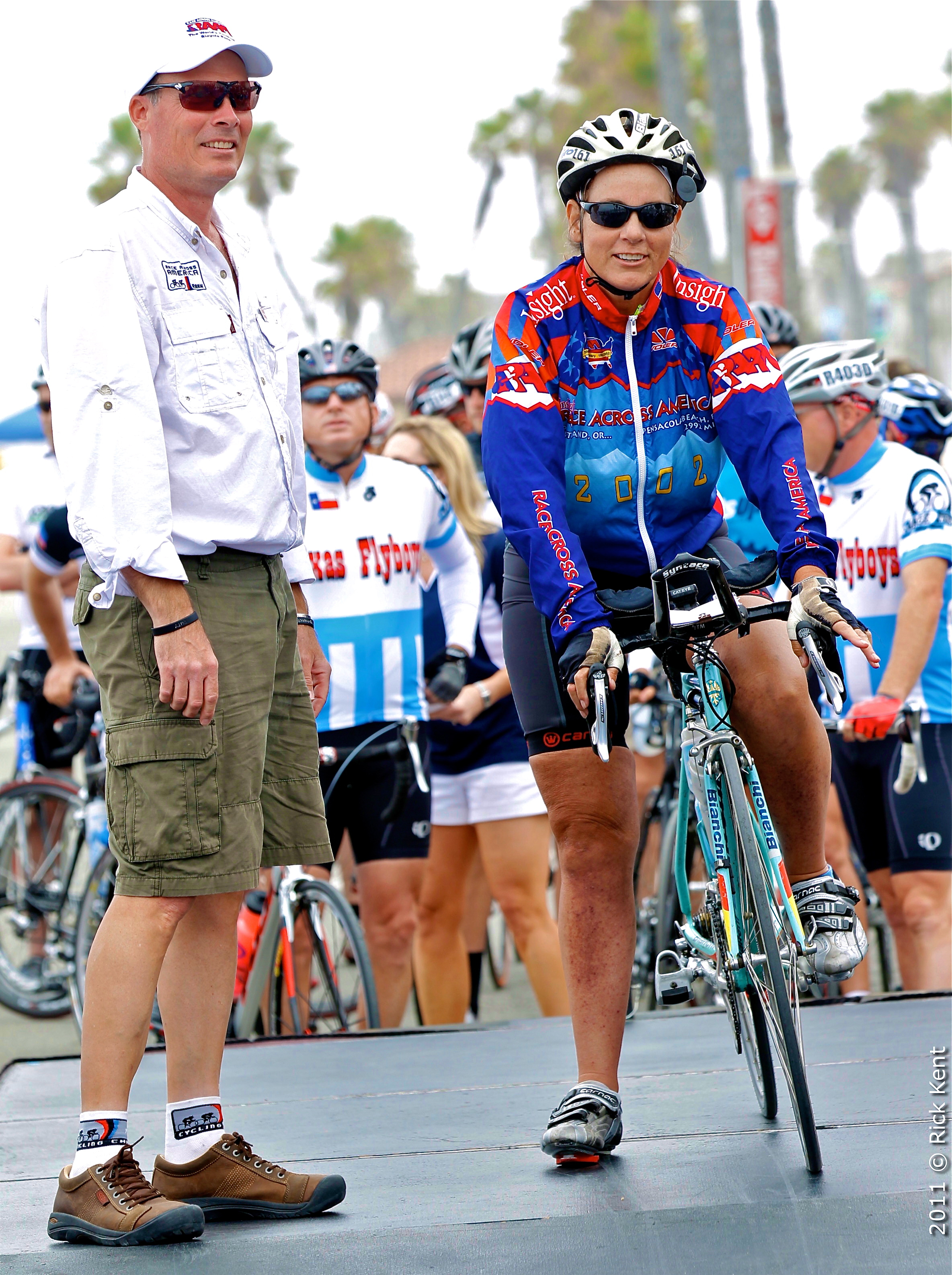
Seana Hogan being honored at the 2011 Race Across America. Pictured left is then-current race director George Thomas

== History ==
The first incarnation of RAAM, The Great American Bike Race, was organized by John Marino in 1982. There were four competitors: John Marino himself, John Howard, Michael Shermer, and Lon Haldeman. The course started in Santa Monica, California and finished at the Empire State Building in New York City, where Haldeman emerged as the winner.

Results of the 1982 race:

Finish	Rider	Home	Time	Average Speed - mph	Average Speed - km/h
1	Lon Haldeman	Harvard, IL	9d 20h 02m	12.57 mph	20.23 km/h
2	John Howard	Houston, TX	10d 10h 59m	11.83 mph	19.04 km/h
3	Michael Shermer	Tustin, CA	10d 19h 54m	11.42 mph	18.38 km/h
4	John Marino	Irvine, CA	12d 07h 37m	10.04 mph	16.16 km/h

After the first year, the name of the event changed to Race Across America, and participation became subject to qualification rather than invitation. The concept caught on and the event grew larger year after year, with riders from around the world showing up to compete. The race was televised on ABC's Wide World of Sports through 1986. Starting in 1989, team divisions were gradually added to introduce new elements of technology and strategy. For example, a category for HPVs and faired bikes resulted in record speeds, and a four-man team division gave racers the option of riding together or taking turns, allowing them to balance higher speeds against longer rest periods.

In addition to races across the full span of the United States, shorter races with a similar format have been included within RAAM; among these are a 24-hour version and the Race Across the West (RAW), typically ending in Durango, Colorado.

The race was not held in 2020 due to the COVID-19 pandemic, and afterward the level of participation did not recover immediately. For example, the number of solo racers was 38 in 2019, 12 in 2021, and 30 in 2023.

The solo division of the 2026 race began on June 16 in Oceanside, California; teams started on June 20. The finish line was in Atlantic City, New Jersey.

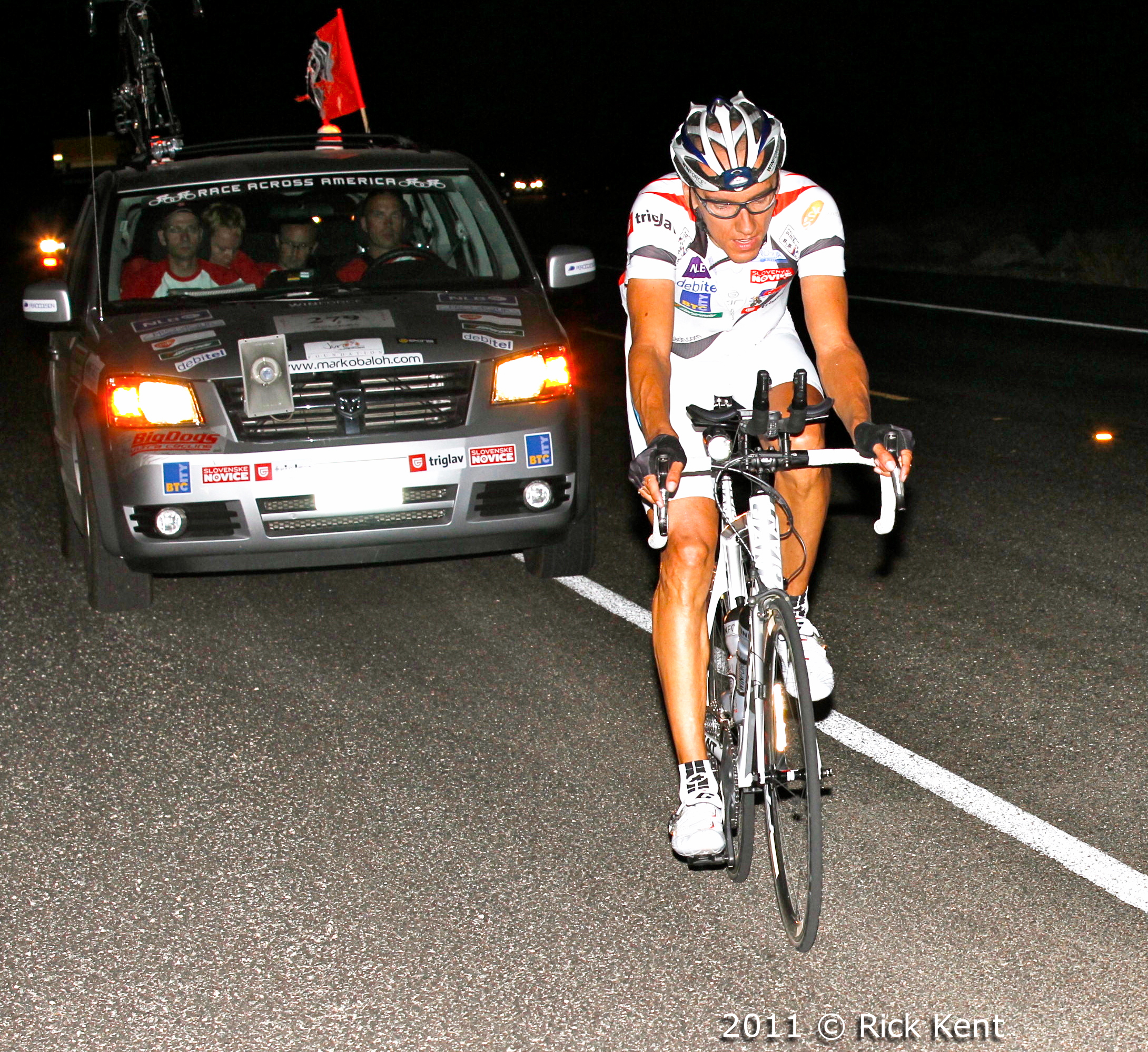
Participants expect to ride nearly around the clock. The leaders will sleep only around an hour per day.

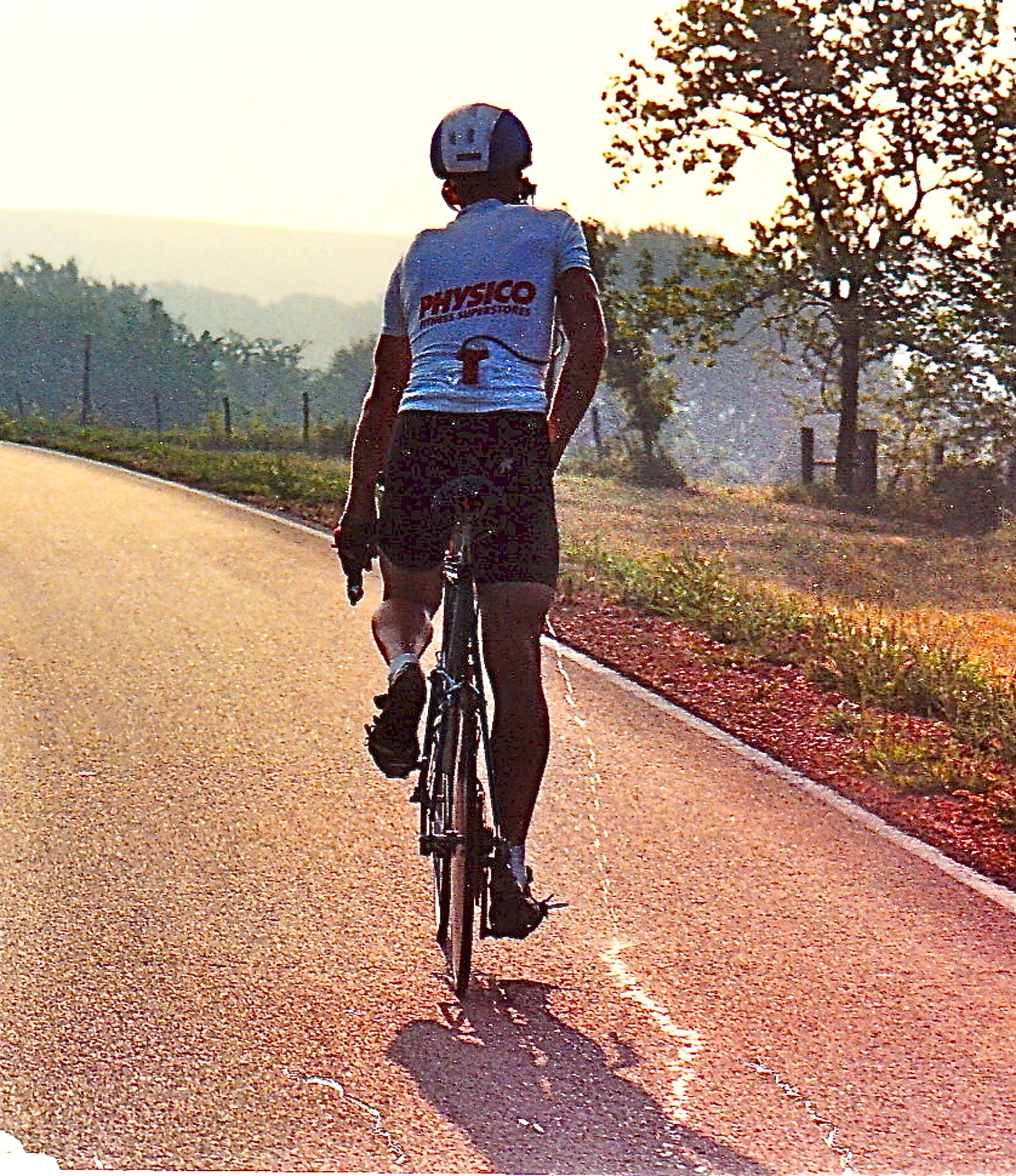
Competitors don't stop unless absolutely necessary even when nature calls.

=== Divisions ===
The race has been held in many different divisions over the years. In 2008, for example, these were:

- RAAM: Solo Female
- RAAM: Solo Male
- RAAM: Solo Male (50–59)
- RAAM: Solo Male (60–69)
- RAAM: Solo Male – Recumbent (50–59)
- RAAM: Two-Person Male
- RAAM: Two-Person Male (50–59)
- RAAM: Two-Person Mixed
- RAAM: Four Person Male
- RAAM: Four Person Male (50–59)
- RAAM: Four Person Male (60–69)
- RAAM: Four Person Female
- RAAM: Four Person Female (50–59)
- RAAM: Four Person Mixed
- RAAM: Four Person Mixed (50–59)
- RAAM: Eight Person
- Race Across the West: Solo Male
- Race Across the West: Solo Male (50–59)
- Race Across the West: Solo Female
- Race Across the West: Two-Person Mixed (50–59)
- Race Across the West: Four-Person Male
- 24 Hour: Four-Person Female
- 24 Hour: Eight Person

=== Fatalities and injuries ===
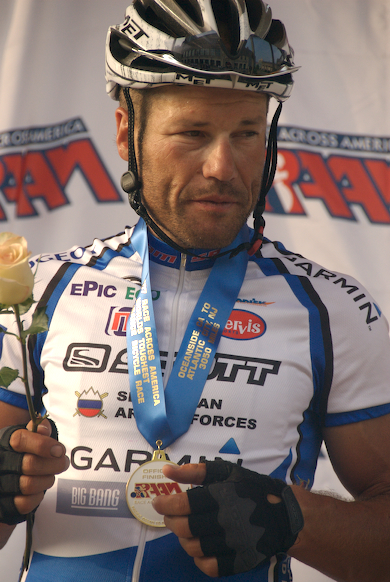
Jure Robič after winning the 2007 race

There have been three fatalities in the race's history. In 2003, team rider Brett Malin was killed when he was hit by an 18-wheel tractor-trailer outside Pie Town, New Mexico. In 2005, solo participant Bob Breedlove was killed in a collision with an oncoming vehicle near Trinidad, Colorado. Details are lacking because he was by himself (his support crew was a few miles behind) and the only witnesses were in the vehicle that collided with him. Outside magazine investigated the crash in its November 2006 issue.

On June 16, 2010, participant Diego Ballesteros Cucurull of Spain was critically injured when he was struck by a car near Wichita, Kansas. A little less than one month later, Ballesteros was home in Spain and undergoing rehabilitation. While not regaining the ability to walk, he continued to cycle using a handbike. Canadian cyclist Wayne Phillips was paralyzed in 1985 when he was struck by a hit-and-run driver in New Mexico.

On June 15, 2015, while in 3rd place, Anders Tesgaard of Denmark was hit by an inattentive truck driver in West Virginia. The driver came from behind and hit Tesgaard at 60 mph. Tesgaard suffered a severe brain injury and multiple fractured bones. He was quickly flown to a hospital, where he went into a coma. He later stabilized and was flown back to Denmark. However, he remained in a coma until his death on February 16, 2018.

On June 18, 2018, while in 3rd place, Austrian rider Thomas Mauerhofer was hit by a car while he made a left turn. He broke his sixth cervical vertebra and had to quit the race. Cervical vertebrae 5 to 7 had to be fused and a fragment of bone was removed. Unable to train for months, he was able to compete again the following year. He finished 4th in the 2026 race.

== Race structure ==
As noted above, unlike most multi-day bicycle races such as the Tour de France, RAAM has a single stage, i.e., there is no specified distance to travel each day. There are no designated rest periods for food and sleep, whose timing must be decided by racers and their crews. The clock runs continuously from start to finish as in a time trial, and the final overall finish time includes rest periods. Thus, the winner is the rider who can best combine fast riding with short and infrequent stops. The winner usually finishes in eight to nine days, after riding approximately 22 hours per day through the varied terrain of the United States. The addition of the 8-person team division has enabled finish times of slightly over five days. Each racer or team has a support crew that follows in vehicles to provide food, water, mechanical repairs and medical aid. During the night, a vehicle with flashing lights is required to follow each rider to ensure safety.

Having to ride continuously for days with little to no sleep puts this event in the category of ultra-distance cycling races. The continuous physical output places considerable strain on the competitors as well as their support crews. As many as 50% of solo participants drop out due to exhaustion or for medical reasons. In addition, the race takes place on open roads, forcing participants to deal with sometimes dangerous traffic conditions. This represents another major difference between RAAM and more traditional bicycle road races on closed courses.

In 2006 the race format changed significantly with the addition of a Solo Enduro division, in which riders were obliged to rest off the bike for a total of 40 hours at specified points across the country. The 40 hours were to be deducted from a rider's total time at the end of the race. These changes were made to improve safety and shift the emphasis to long-distance riding speed and away from the capacity to endure sleep deprivation. Because the intention was to phase out the traditional format, it was announced that henceforth the official RAAM champion would be the winner of the Solo Enduro division. In the first year the winner was 50-year-old Jonathan Boyer, who had won the fourth edition of RAAM twenty-one years earlier. However, interest in the Enduro format rapidly faded among riders, and the division was soon eliminated. The official RAAM champion is now the winner of the Solo Traditional division, which simply measures total elapsed time from west coast to east coast.

The Trans Am Bike Race is similar to RAAM in that it is a non-stop bicycle race across the US, but it covers an even longer distance and riders are self-supported, meaning that all support from other racers, friends, family, or organizers is forbidden. Supplies and services must be obtained from commercial sources and no support vehicles are allowed.

== Records ==
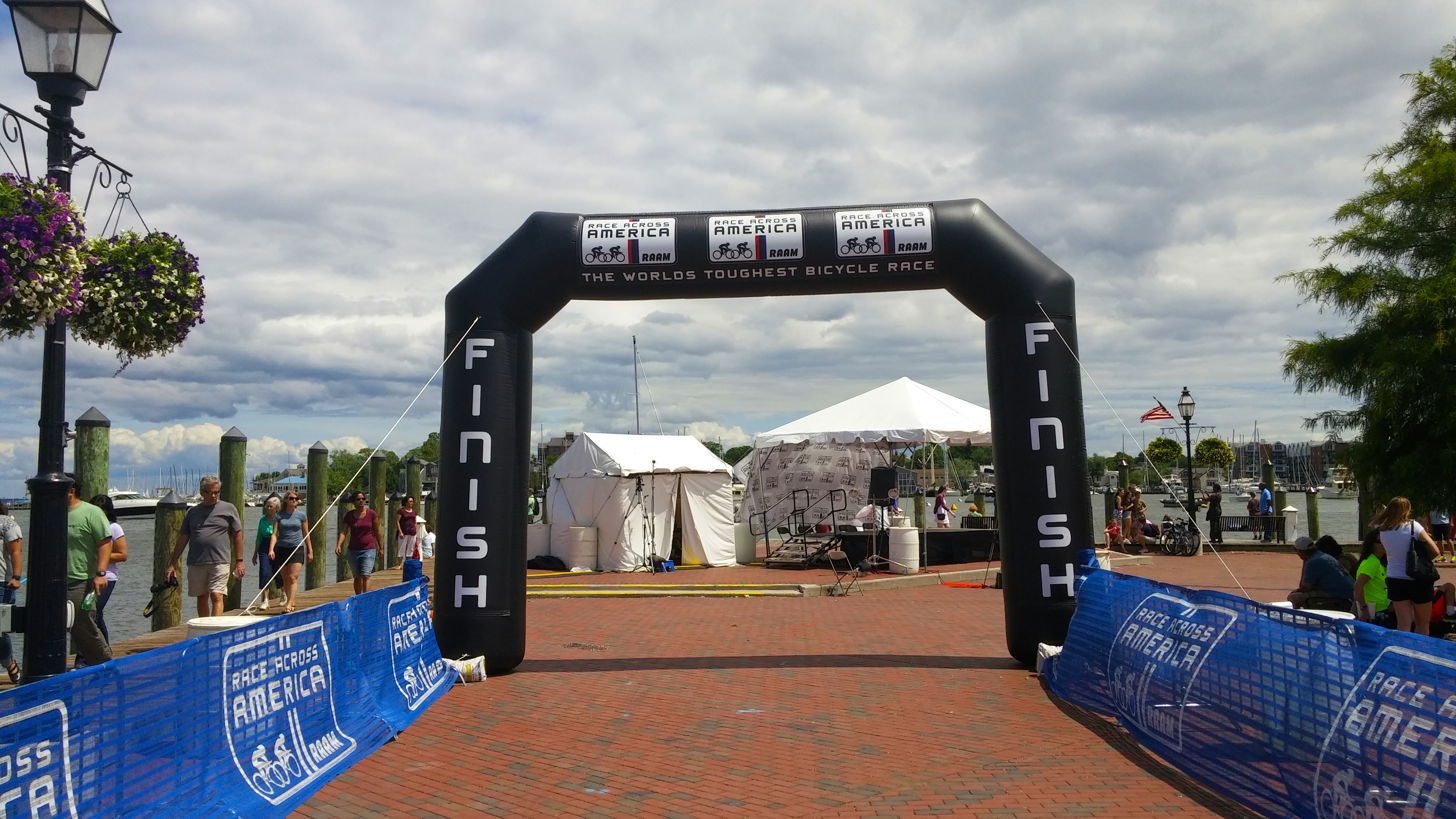
RAAM 2015 finish line in Annapolis, MD

Because the course has varied, performances from different years are not entirely comparable. Records are usually expressed in terms of average speed, not total time, to account in part for differences in course length. For many years, the fastest men's speed was by Pete Penseyres in 1986, when he rode 3,107 miles (5,000 km) at an average of 15.40 mph (24.78 km/h). This record was finally broken in 2013 by Christoph Strasser, who then smashed his own record the following year by riding 3,020 miles (4,860 km) at 16.42 mph (26.43 km/h). The fastest woman was Seana Hogan in 1995, who averaged 13.23 mph (21.29 km/h) over 2,912 miles (4,686 km).

For many years, the shortest elapsed time for a solo crossing of the United States was outside of an official RAAM, by Michael Secrest in 1990, in 7 days, 23 hours, and 16 minutes. Again, this record was narrowly broken in 2013 by RAAM winner Christoph Strasser, who in 2014 set the current mark of 7:15:56. In comparison, in 1953 Corporal Donald Mainland, USMC (retired), raced from Santa Monica, California to New York City, a distance of 2,963 miles. Limiting himself to riding 10 hours per day, he completed the race in 14 days, 11 hours and 50 minutes, besting the previous record by 6 days. He rode about 200 miles a day, averaging about 20 mph.

With his sixth win in 2019, Christoph Strasser passed the late Jure Robič of Slovenia as the all-time record holder for solo RAAM victories. He is also the first to take three titles in a row. Robič was killed in September 2010 in a collision with a car while training for the Crocodile Trophy, the endurance mountain bike race held annually in Australia. He was the RAAM title-holder at the time of his death.

In its traditional form, RAAM is a solo competitor event – a non-stop individual time trial. As noted above, this idea was expanded in 1989 with the creation of the new HPV (Human Powered Vehicle) category as a four-person relay; race organizers called this the Human Powered Vehicle Race Across America. HPV RAAM was slated as a platform for technology advancement in cycling aerodynamics and human powered propulsion, but it also paved the way for more team competitions thereafter. Favored to win, Team Gold Rush led most of the way but did not finish. First, second and third places went to Team Lightning, Team Cronos and Team Strawberry, respectively. Team Lightning set the overall fastest RAAM time of 5:01:08 over a relatively short course of 2,911 miles (4,685 km), a record which still stands as of 2026. In later years team members could ride together to take advantage of drafting, so speeds improved, but in the 1989 race there could only be one rider on the road at a time.

Team Action Sports from Bakersfield, California, established the record for the four-person male division in 2004. The team, whose members were Nathaniel Faulkner, Kerry Ryan, Sean Nealy, and William Innes, averaged 23.06 mph (37.11 km/h) to complete the 2,959 miles (4,762 km) in 5:08:17. The record for an eight-person team was established by Team SV Enge-Sande in 2026. This squad of riders completed 3,068 miles (4,937 km) in 5:02:47, for an average speed of 24.99 mph (40.22 km/h).

In 2021, Leah Goldstein became the first woman to win the overall solo division. As of 2026, women have been RAAM overall winners twice.

== List of overall solo winners ==
This is an all-time list of winners of Race Across America in the Solo Traditional category.

Year	Winner	Nationality	Route	Miles	km	Time	mph	km/h
1982	Lon Haldeman	United States	Santa Monica Pier, CA to Empire State Building, NY	2,968	4,777	9 days 20 h 02 min	12.57	20.23
1983	Lon Haldeman	United States	Santa Monica Pier, CA to Boardwalk, Atlantic City, NJ	3,170	5,102	10 days 16 h 29 min	12.36	19.89
1984	Pete Penseyres	United States	Huntington Beach, CA to Boardwalk, Atlantic City, NJ	3,047	4,904	9 days 13 h 13 min	13.29	21.39
1985	Jonathan Boyer	United States	Huntington Beach, CA to Boardwalk, Atlantic City, NJ	3,120	5,021	9 days 02 h 06 min	14.31	23.03
1986	Pete Penseyres	United States	Huntington Beach, CA to Boardwalk, Atlantic City, NJ	3,107	5,000	8 days 09 h 47 min	15.40	24.78
1987	Michael Secrest	United States	San Francisco, CA to Washington Monument, DC	3,127	5,032	9 days 11 h 35 min	13.74	22.11
1988	Franz Spilauer	Austria	San Francisco, CA to Washington Monument, DC	3,073	4,946	9 days 07 h 09 min	13.77	22.16
1989	Paul Solon	United States	Fairgrounds, Irvine, CA to Battery Park, NY City, NY	2,911	4,685	8 days 08 h 45 min	14.50	23.34
1990	Bob Fourney	United States	Holiday Inn, Irvine, CA to Rousakis Plaza, Savannah, GA	2,930	4,715	8 days 11 h 26 min	14.40	23.17
1991	Bob Fourney	United States	Holiday Inn, Irvine, CA to Rousakis Plaza, Savannah, GA	2,930	4,715	8 days 16 h 44 min	14.04	22.60
1992	Rob Kish	United States	Holiday Inn, Irvine, CA to Rousakis Plaza, Savannah, GA	2,911	4,685	8 days 03 h 11 min	14.91	24.00
1993	Gerry Tatrai	Australia	Holiday Inn, Irvine, CA to Rousakis Plaza, Savannah, GA	2,910	4,683	8 days 20 h 19 min	13.71	22.06
1994	Rob Kish	United States	Holiday Inn, Irvine, CA to Rousakis Plaza, Savannah, GA	2,901	4,669	8 days 14 h 25 min	14.05	22.61
1995	Rob Kish	United States	Holiday Inn, Irvine, CA to Rousakis Plaza, Savannah, GA	2,912	4,686	8 days 19 h 59 min	13.74	22.11
1996	Danny Chew	United States	Holiday Inn, Irvine, CA to Rousakis Plaza, Savannah, GA	2,905	4,675	8 days 07 h 14 min	14.58	23.46
1997	Wolfgang Fasching	Austria	Holiday Inn, Irvine, CA to Rousakis Plaza, Savannah, GA	3,025	4,868	9 days 04 h 50 min	13.70	22.05
1998	Gerry Tatrai	Australia	Holiday Inn, Irvine, CA to Rousakis Plaza, Savannah, GA	2,906	4,677	8 days 11 h 22 min	14.29	23.00
1999	Danny Chew	United States	Holiday Inn, Irvine, CA to Rousakis Plaza, Savannah, GA	2,938	4,728	8 days 07 h 34 min	14.72	23.69
2000	Wolfgang Fasching	Austria	Portland, Oregon to Pensacola Beach, Florida	2,975.1	4,788.0	8 days 10 h 19 min	14.71	23.67
2001	Andrea Clavadetscher	Liechtenstein	Portland, Oregon to Pensacola Beach, Florida	2,983.2	4,801.0	9 days 00 h 17 min	13.79	22.19
2002	Wolfgang Fasching	Austria	Portland, Oregon to Pensacola Beach, Florida	2,991.9	4,815.0	9 days 03 h 38 min	13.62	21.92
2003	Allen Larsen	United States	San Diego, CA to Atlantic City, NJ	2,921.7	4,702.0	8 days 23 h 36 min	13.55	21.81
2004	Jure Robič	Slovenia	San Diego, CA to Atlantic City, NJ	2,958.5	4,761.2	8 days 09 h 51 min	14.66	23.59
2005	Jure Robič	Slovenia	San Diego, CA to Atlantic City, NJ	3,051.7	4,911.2	9 days 08 h 48 min	13.58	21.85
2006	Daniel Wyss	Switzerland	Oceanside, CA to Atlantic City, NJ	3,042.8	4,896.9	9 days 11 h 50 min	13.36	21.50
2007	Jure Robič	Slovenia	Oceanside, CA to Atlantic City, NJ	3,042.8	4,896.9	8 days 19 h 33 min	14.38	23.14
2008	Jure Robič	Slovenia	Oceanside, CA to Annapolis, MD	3,014.4	4,851.2	8 days 23 h 33 min	13.98	22.50
2009	Daniel Wyss	Switzerland	Oceanside, CA to Annapolis, MD	3,021.3	4,862.3	8 days 05 h 45 min	15.28	24.59
2010	Jure Robič	Slovenia	Oceanside, CA to Annapolis, MD	3,005.1	4,836.2	9 days 01 h 01 min	13.85	22.29
2011	Christoph Strasser	Austria	Oceanside, CA to Annapolis, MD	2,989.5	4,811.1	8 days 08 h 06 min	14.94	24.04
2012	Reto Schoch	Switzerland	Oceanside, CA to Annapolis, MD	2,989.5	4,811.1	8 days 06 h 29 min	15.06	24.24
2013	Christoph Strasser	Austria	Oceanside, CA to Annapolis, MD	2,993.3	4,817.2	7 days 22 h 52 min	15.68	25.23
2014	Christoph Strasser	Austria	Oceanside, CA to Annapolis, MD	3,020.0	4,860.2	7 days 15 h 56 min	16.42	26.43
2015	Severin Zotter	Austria	Oceanside, CA to Annapolis, MD	3,020.0	4,860.2	8 days 08 h 17 min	15.08	24.27
2016	Pierre Bischoff	Germany	Oceanside, CA to Annapolis, MD	3,069.0	4,939.1	9 days 17 h 09 min	13.16	21.18
2017	Christoph Strasser	Austria	Oceanside, CA to Annapolis, MD	3,070.0	4,940.7	8 days 09 h 34 min	15.23	24.51
2018	Christoph Strasser	Austria	Oceanside, CA to Annapolis, MD	3,069.8	4,940.4	8 days 01 h 23 min	15.94	25.65
2019	Christoph Strasser	Austria	Oceanside, CA to Annapolis, MD	3,069.8	4,940.4	8 days 06 h 16 min	15.44	24.85
2021	Leah Goldstein	Canada	Oceanside, CA to Annapolis, MD	3,037.8	4,888.9	11 days 03 h 3 min	11.38	18.31
2022	Allan Jefferson	Australia	Oceanside, CA to Annapolis, MD	3,037.8	4,888.9	10 days 0 h 15 min	12.64	20.34
2023	Isa Pulver	Switzerland	Oceanside, CA to Annapolis, MD	3,037.7	4,888.7	9 days 18 h 48 min	12.94	20.82
2024	Jimmy Ronn	Sweden	Oceanside, CA to Atlantic City, NJ	3,041.3	4,894.5	8 days 18 h 11 min	14.47	23.29
2025	Philipp Kaider	Austria	Oceanside, CA to Atlantic City, NJ	3,068.2	4,937.8	8 days 22 h 32 min	14.30	23.01
2026	Philipp Kaider	Austria	Oceanside, CA to Atlantic City, NJ	3,068.2	4,937.8	8 days 18 h 58 min	14.54	23.40

== See also ==
- Race Around Ireland, established 2009, RAAM Qualifying Event
- Race Around Poland, established 2021, RAAM Qualifying Event
