= Bicycling the Pacific Coast =

1984 guide book

- Cover of fourth edition
- Author: Vicky Spring
- Illustrator: Tom Kirkendall (photographer/cartographer)
- Language: English
- Subject: Bicycle touring
- Genre: Nonfiction
- Publisher: The Mountaineers Books
- Publication date: 1984
- Publication place: United States
- Media type: Paperback
- Pages: 272
- ISBN: 0-89886-954-4

Bicycling the Pacific Coast is a 1984 bicycle touring guide by Vicky Spring and Tom Kirkendall, published by The Mountaineers Books. The book covers a nearly 2,000-mile (3,200 km) route from Vancouver, British Columbia to Tijuana, Mexico, following mostly United States Highway 101 and California State Route 1.

It has been called "a classic" and "the Bible for touring cyclists." In its Oregon Coast Bike Route guide, Oregon Department of Transportation noted the book as an "excellent" guide to its 370-mile (600 km) portion of Spring and Kirkendall's route.
