= Melburn Roobaix =

- Status: Active
- Genre: Non-competitive recreational cycling event.
- Frequency: The last Sunday in June – Annually since 2006
- Locations: Inner Melbourne, Victoria
- Country: Australia
- Inaugurated: 2005
- Participants: c. 1,000 to 2,000
- Organiser: FYXO
- Website: https://fyxo.co/pages/melburn-roobaix

Melburn Roobaix is a non-competitive recreational cycling event organised by FYXO in Victoria, Australia. Cyclists register to ride a course which is only revealed on the day, but is typically 40 kilometres (25 mi) around the inner suburbs of Melbourne, ending at Brunswick Velodrome.

According to the organisers:

Melburn Roobaix explores the bumpiest sectors of cobbled lanes and alleys, exploring lesser known parts of the city, and embracing the spirit of being big kids on bikes.

Melburn Roobaix is in no way a race. A truly unique event attracting every branch of the cycling religion.

Stuart O'Grady, winner of the 2007 Paris–Roubaix rode the 10th edition of the event in 2015.
