= Heinz Stücke =

German cyclist and photographer (1940–2026)

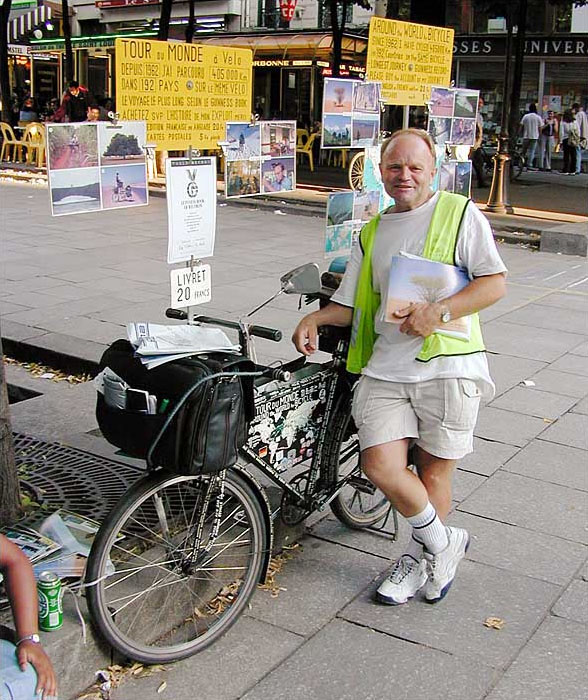
- Stücke poses with his three-speed bicycle for a photo while selling his wares in Paris. (9 July 1999)
- Born: 11 January 1940; Hövelhof, Gau Westphalia-North, Germany
- Died: 22 July 2026 (aged 86); Hövelhof, North Rhine-Westphalia, Germany
- Citizenship: Germany
- Occupations: Cyclist, photographer, writer
- Known for: Cycling for most of his life through every country in the world.

Heinz Stücke (11 January 1940 – 22 July 2026) was a German long-distance itinerant cyclist from Hövelhof, North Rhine-Westphalia – noted for setting the world record for bicycle touring in 1995.

In a global journey spanning more than 50 years, Stücke travelled over 600,000 kilometres by bicycle.

== Global bicycle tour ==
In November 1962, the 22-year-old Stücke quit his job as a tool and die maker, and rode out of his hometown on a three-speed bicycle, with a plan to see the world. He said that his extraordinary desire to travel was partly motivated by his aversion to returning to factory work.

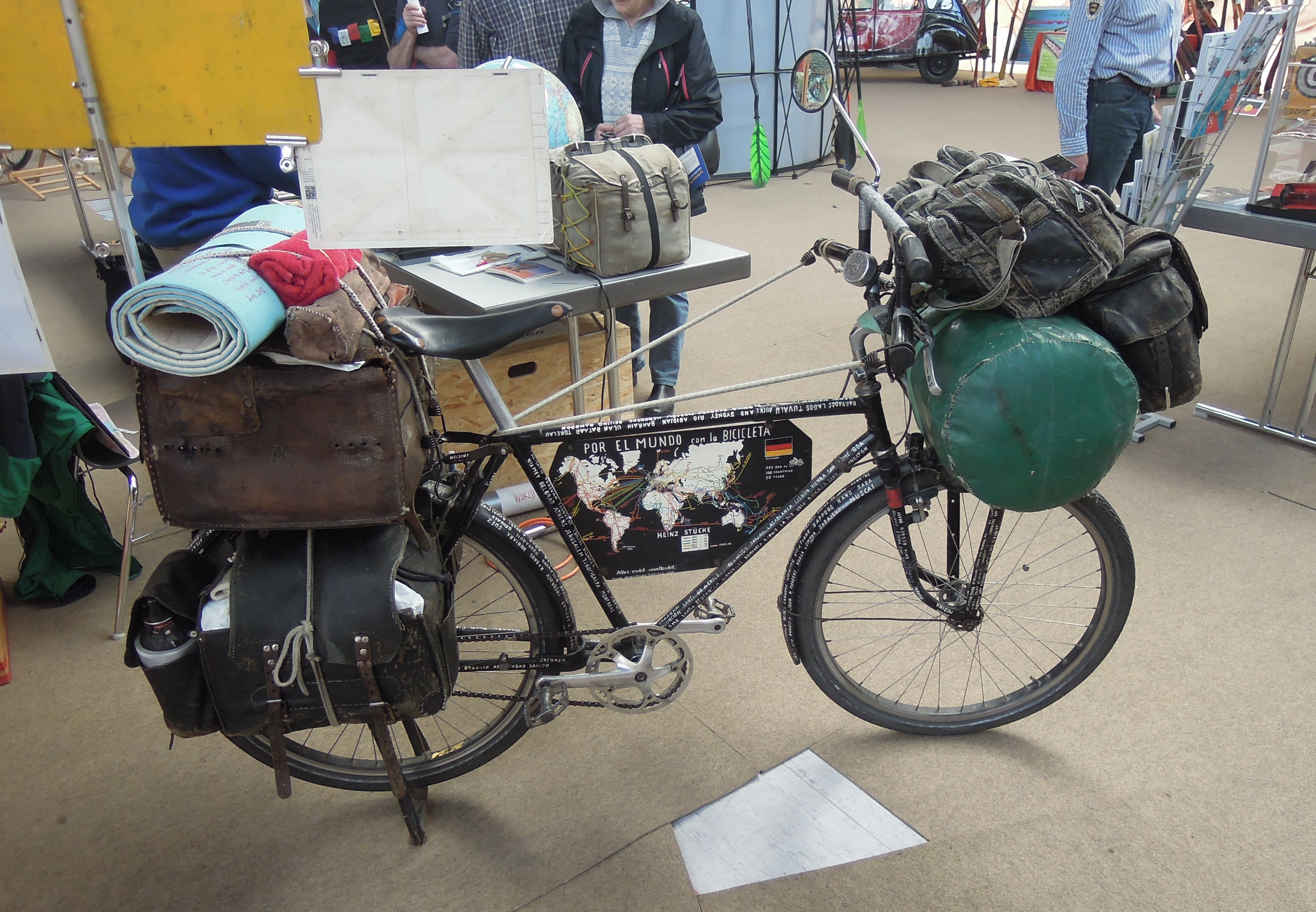
Stücke's touring cycle loaded with luggage

In the early 1980s, after two decades on the road, Stücke decided to attempt to visit every country in the world. He believed he had accomplished his goal when he reached Seychelles in 1996, but to him it felt anticlimactic. He had spent too little time in some countries, and there was still much to experience; so he carried on. Between 1962 and 2010, he cycled more than 609,000 kilometres (378,000 mi), and visited 195 countries and 78 territories. From 1995 through 1999, the Guinness Book of Records described him as having travelled more widely by bicycle than anyone in history.

During his travels, Stücke encountered many hazards and suffered numerous injuries:

- In the Chilean Atacama Desert, he was hit by a truck.
- In Haiti, he was chased by an angry mob.
- In Egypt, he was beaten unconscious by soldiers.
- In Cameroon, he was detained by the military for "slandering the state".
- In Alaska he got into a car accident, ending up in a freezing river.
- In the United States he was abandoned by an automobile driver who stole all of his supplies after offering him a ride.
- In Indonesia, 1974, he suffered a serious bout of dysentery.
- In Zambia, 1980, he was shot in the big toe when surrounded by four of Joshua Nkomo's "Freedom Fighters".
- In Mozambique, 1995, he was attacked by bees while bathing in a river.
- In Siberia, 1997, his bicycle was stolen for the fifth time, along with his luggage (all of which was recovered).
- In England, 2006, his bicycle—the same machine he rode from Hövelhof in 1962—was stolen again, this time from his campsite in Portsmouth. (The bicycle was recovered the following day in a local park.)

Although he rode the same steel-framed bicycle on most of his journeys, in 2002 he rode across Canada with a partner on a Hase Pino tandem recumbent bicycle, which Hase Spezialräder built and sponsored.

=== Recording the journey ===
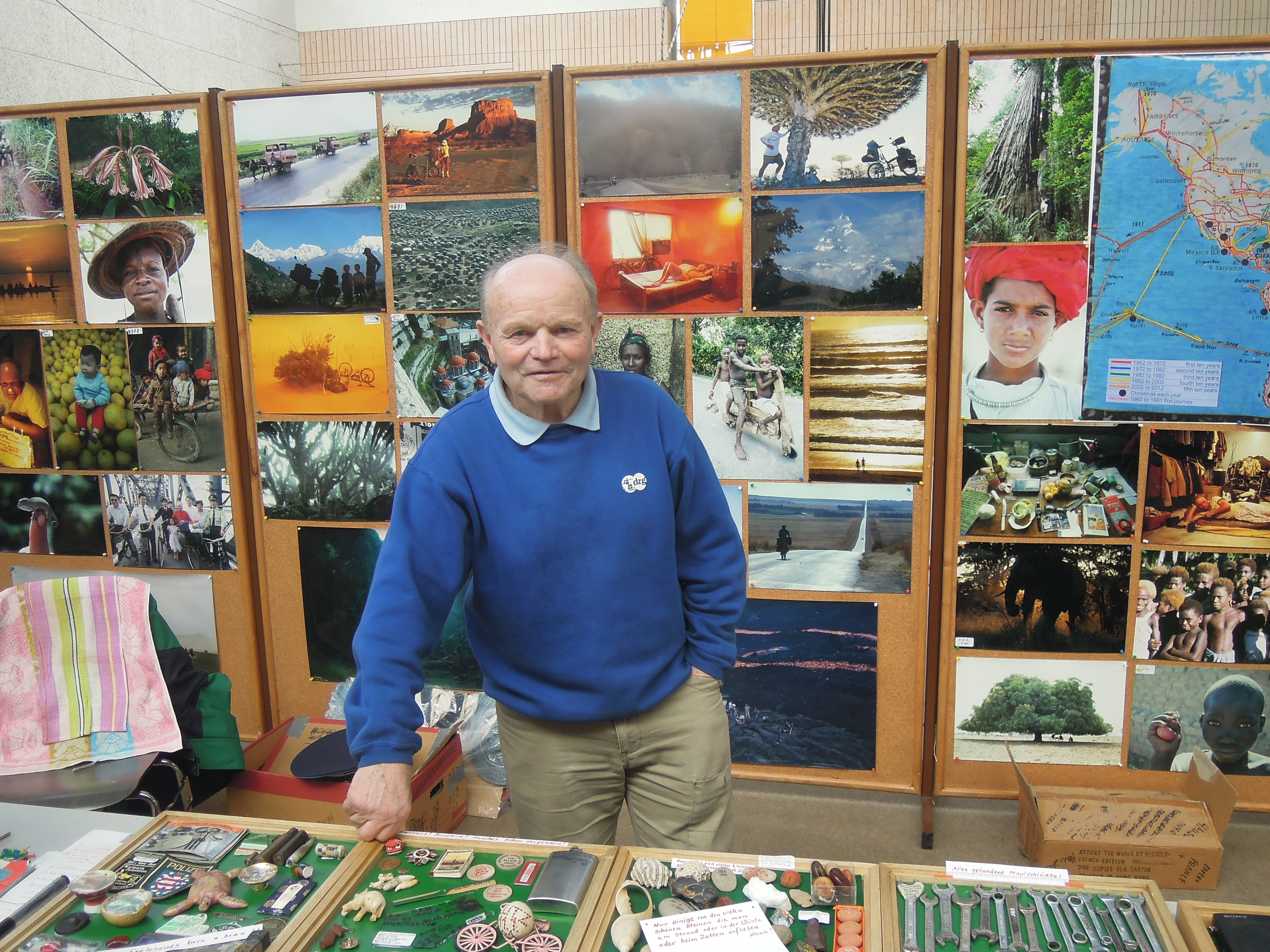
Stücke poses with some of his photographs and other memorabilia.

During his decades of travel, Stücke took more than 100,000 photographs. He funded his expeditions with licensing revenue from his photo catalogue; donations; and sales of his travel writing, postcards, and booklets that featured his photographs, writing, and illustrations.

In 1995, around the time he set the world record for bicycle touring, Stücke self-published a memoir: Mit dem Fahrrad um die Welt ("Cycling Around the World"). In 2015, Dutch travel writer Eric van den Berg published a biography commemorating Stücke's career of global bicycle touring—a career that by then had continued for more than 50 years. The book, Home Is Elsewhere: 50 Years Around the World by Bike, also features Stücke's photographs.

In the 2010s, Spanish filmmaker Albert Albacete began making a documentary film about Stücke and his legacy. The film, The Man Who Wanted to See It All (2021), inquires into Stücke's motivations and philosophy. While Albacete was making the film, he learned that some villagers in Stücke's hometown of Hövelhof were building a museum to document and celebrate Stücke's travels and achievements.

== Death ==
Stücke died on 22 July 2026, at the age of 86.
