= Algirdas Gurevičius =

Lithuanian adventurer, touring cyclist, filmmaker, vlogger, farmer, programmer

- Born: 23 August 1985 (age 41); Vilnius, Lithuanian SSR, Soviet Union
- Occupations: cyclist, filmmaker, vlogger, farmer and programmer
- Website: www.spikis.lt/en/

Algirdas Gurevičius (born 23 August 1985) is a Lithuanian adventurer, touring cyclist, filmmaker, vlogger, farmer and programmer.

== Biography ==
Algirdas Gurevičius began filming and engaging in bicycle tours in Lithuania in 2004. Since 2006 Algirdas has been involved in expeditions to other countries, both as a participant and as a leader. He has since biked in Latvia (2006), Ukraine (Crimea in 2007), Croatia (2008), the People’s Republic of China (2009), Iceland (2010), Romania (2011), the Russian Federation (Altai Republic in 2012), India (Himalayas, State of Himachal Pradesh in 2013), Georgia (2014), Kyrgyzstan (2015), Austria, Mongolia, Slovakia, Slovenia, Poland (2016), Namibia (2017), Tajikistan (2018), Canada, the United States of America (2022) and made documentaries about many of them. He has also made Youtube vlogs about solo cycling tours in Estonia (2017), Norway (Lofoten archipelago, 2019), around the borders and coastline of Lithuania (except the Curonian Spit and Dieveniškės "appendix", 2021), and a hiking tour with his wife in Poland (Tatra mountains, 2019). In 2024 Algirdas cycled and published vlogs about his solo trip around the United Kingdom (Scotland, England and his way home to Lithuania via France, Belgium, the Netherlands, Germany, Denmark, Sweden, Finland, Estonia and Latvia.

Algirdas organizes the cycling tours, with each tour focusing on the exploration of nature, mountains and wilderness over a period of about a month. The tours are run on a not-for-profit basis, with participants using their own equipment and covering their own expenses, such as food and plane tickets. The participants also share day-to-day duties during the trip including taking care of food, medicine, financial planning and basic repairs of bicycles. Algirdas' expedition team usually consists of a small group (2-6) of Lithuanians (veteran members and first-timers alike) but he also has experience of teaming up with foreign (British, German, Indian) travellers. His group travelling to Namibia included another Lithuanian traveller Aurimas Valujavičius, who later became famous after crossing the Atlantic on a solo rowing boat trip in 2023.

As a professional camera operator and film editor Algirdas directs and produces his documentary films himself (in the latter trips he began using a drone for filming as well). Before each trip Algirdas launches a public website featuring a GPS tracker as well as text and picture sharing capabilities which enables the public to track the expedition’s progress. In 2011 Algirdas Gurevičius co-founded "Špikis", a Lithuanian non-profit public organisation that seeks to promote travelling by bicycle.

In February 2019, at the premiere of his latest film "Cycling around Tajikistan" Algirdas announced that he was ceasing his activities relating to organizing cycling tours and filming documentaries about them, in order to focus on his other ideas and projects. However he expressed hopes of returning in the future with at least one more movie, with one of his long-held wishes being to cycle around Kamchatka (Russia) to see its volcanoes (after the 2022 Russian invasion of Ukraine he decided not to pursue this idea anymore).

In May 2019 he started publishing YouTube podcasts "Pokalbiai prie laužo" (Lithuanian "Conversations by the fire"). In June 2019 he also began publishing vlogs, addressing practical questions arising during the preparation of cycling tours.

In 2022 Algirdas and his wife completed their longest cycling tour, which took over 6 months and covered 6000 kilometers (more than 3728 miles), publishing their vlogs (some of which were subtitled in English) along the way. In this trip the couple crossed the USA from the Canadian to the Mexican borders (Western Wildlands route, including the Hiawatha Scenic Bike Trail and the Skyline Drive in Utah), as well as parts of the Pacific Coast, Canada (Trans-Canada trail), Yellowstone National Park, Salt Lake City and other places. Algirdas singled out the Skyline Drive as the most spectacular section of all of his tours, and one if its summits as the campsite with the most gorgeous views. During the tour “Špikis” was collecting contributions, half of which were donated to a Lithuanian fund aimed at preserving forests, with the couple adding a contribution of their own.

In January 2024 a film "Iceland: Lost in Desert" premiered in the major cinemas of Lithuania. It featured Algirdas travelling with his wife around Iceland with a car, as well as hiking (August 2023), while reminiscing about his earlier month-long bicycle trip around the country in 2010. The online version of the film had English subtitles added. Later some additional material from the trip was published in a series of vlogs on "Špikis" YouTube channel as well.

In May 2024 Algirdas started a 5 week solo cycling trip around Scotland (and some parts of England). After a short flight home in July, he returned to Edinburgh to cycle back to Vilnius, Lithuania through Europe. He completed his trip in September 2024 having cycled more than 6500 kilometers (4000+ miles) and visiting 11 countries.

In the spring of 2025, Algirdas Gurevičius and his wife acquired a hazelnut farm in the Prienai District Municipality. That same year he began publishing vlogs on his YouTube channel about the development of the farm, renovation work on a residential house, the use of various technological solutions, including a solar power system, and discussions with experts in these fields. Since 2026, the scope of the vlogs has expanded to include indoor cultivation of vegetables and mushrooms, as well as hydroponics trials.

== Filmography ==
The following films were shown in Lithuanian cinemas, on multiple Lithuanian TV channels, and at international EU Film Festival in Georgia. Some of the films are dubbed in English and are available online.

- "Dviračiais per Rumuniją" (Cycling around Romania, 2011, English subtitles)
- "Dviračiais per Altajų" (Cycling around Altay, 2012, English subtitles)
- "Dviračiais per Himalajus" (Cycling around Himalayas, 2013, English subtitles)
- "Dviračiais per Gruziją" (Cycling around Georgia, 2014, English subtitles)
- "Dviračiais per Kirgiziją" (Cycling around Kyrgyzstan, 2016)
- "Dviračiais per Mongoliją" (Cycling around Mongolia, 2017)
- "Dviračiais Afrikoje: Namibija" (Cycling in Africa: Namibia, 2018)
- "Dviračiais per Tadžikiją" (Cycling around Tajikistan, 2019, English subtitles)
- "Islandija: Paklydę dykumoje" (Iceland: Lost in Desert, 2024; English subtitles added for the online version)
