= Bicycle touring =

Holidays with bicycles

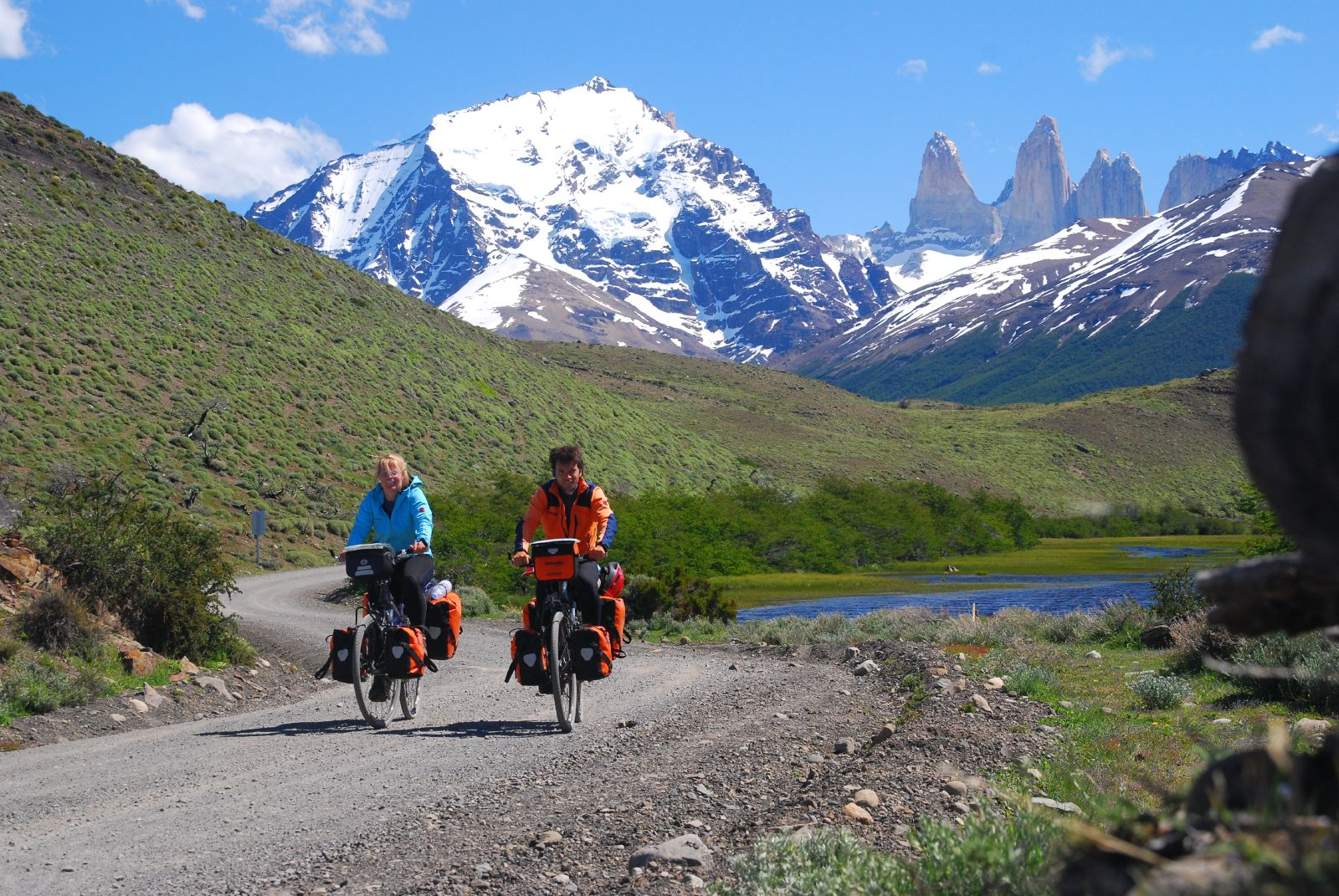
Expedition type bicycle touring Cordillera del Paine

Bicycle touring is the taking of self-contained cycling trips for pleasure, adventure or autonomy rather than sport, commuting or exercise. Bicycle touring can range from single-day trips to extended travels spanning weeks or months. Tours may be planned by the participant or organized by a tourism business, local club or organization, or a charity as a fund-raising venture.

== Origins ==
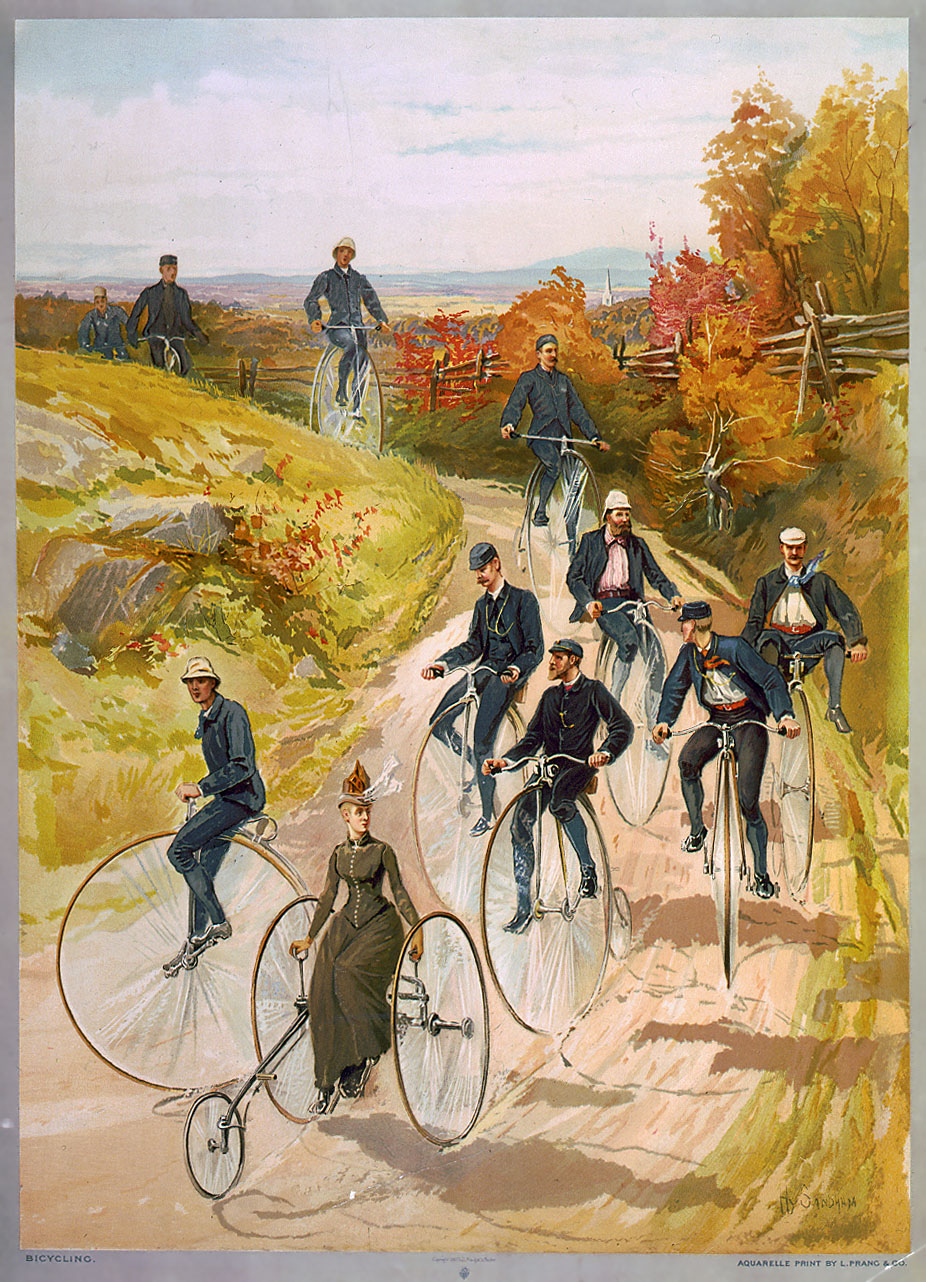
Touring the countryside, 1887

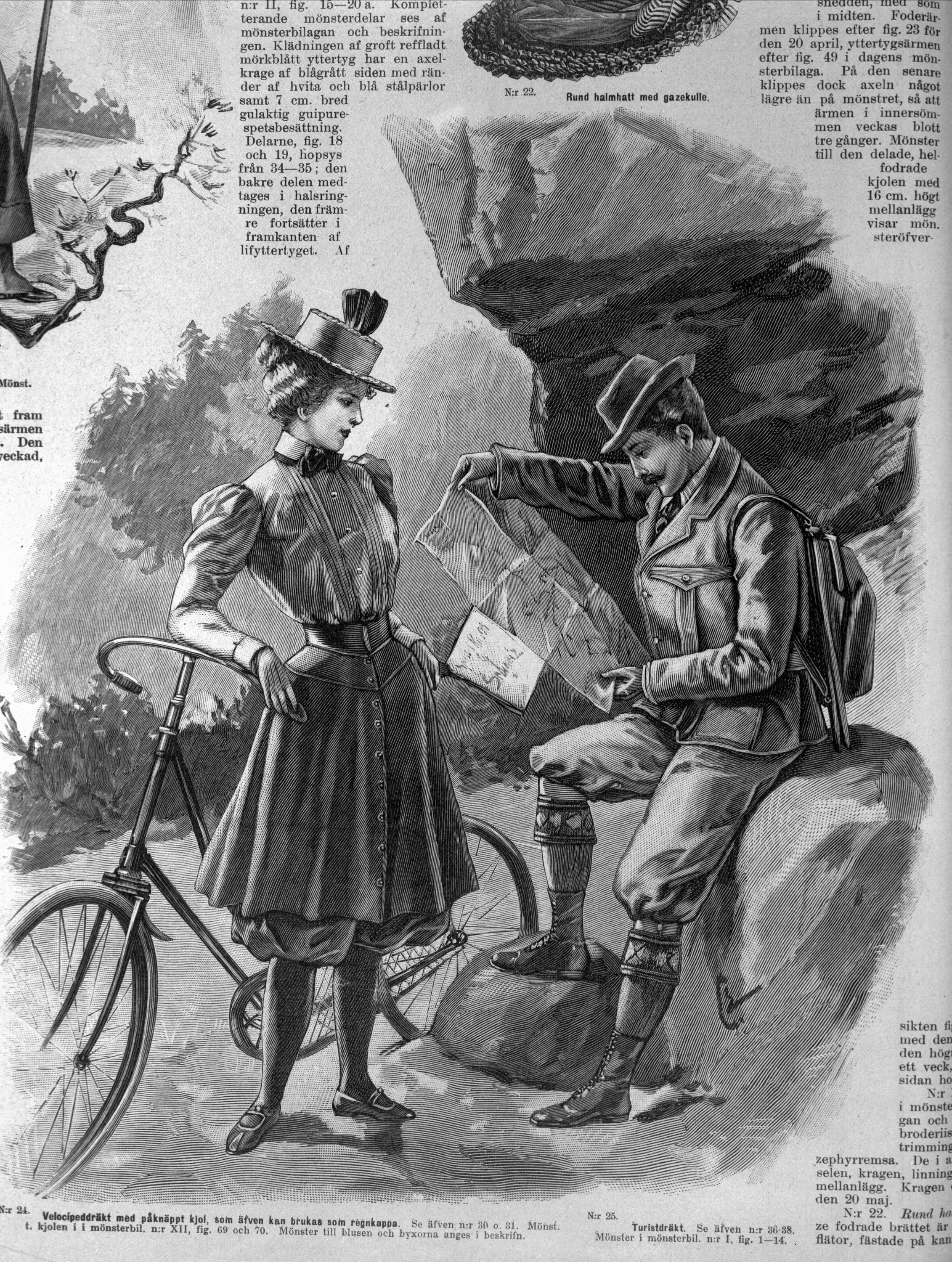
Woman in bicycle clothes and buttoned on skirt that also can be used as raincoat

Historian James McGurn speaks of bets being taken in London in the 19th century for riders of hobby-horses – machines pushed by the feet rather than pedaled – Outspeeding stagecoaches. "One practitioner beat a four-horse coach to Brighton by half an hour," he says. "There are various accounts of 15 to 17-year-olds draisienne-touring around France in the 1820s.

On 17 February 1869 John Mayall, Charles Spencer and Rowley Turner rode from Trafalgar Square, London, to Brighton in 15 hours for 53 miles. The Times, which had sent a reporter to follow them in a coach and pair, reported an "Extraordinary Velocipede Feat." Three riders set off from Liverpool to London, a journey of three days and similar to modern cycle-touring adventures, in March that same year. A newspaper report said:

Their bicycles caused no little astonishment on the way, and the remarks passed by the natives were also amusing. At some of the villages the boys clustered round the machines, and, where they could, caught hold of them and ran behind until they were tired out. Many enquiries were made as to the name of 'them queer horses', some called them 'whirligigs', 'menageries' and 'valparaisons'. Between Wolverhampton and Birmingham, attempts were made to upset the riders by throwing stones.

Enthusiasm extended to other countries. The New York Times spoke of "quantities of velocipedes flying like shuttles hither and thither". But while British interest had less frenzy than in the United States, it lasted longer.

The expansion from a machine that had to be pushed to propelled through pedals on a front wheel made longer distances feasible. A rider calling himself "A Light Dragoon" told in 1870 or 1871 of a ride from Lewes to Salisbury, across southern England. The title of his book, Wheels and Woes, suggests a less than event-free ride but McGurn says "it seems to have been a delightful adventure, despite bad road surfaces, dust and lack of signposts. Husband and wife team Joseph Pennell (illustrator) and Elizabeth Robins Pennell (writer) published travelogues of their journeys framed as literary pilgrimages; they "wheeled" a tandem tricycle from Florence to Rome, attracting more attention than she was comfortable with, as possibly the first female rider that the Italians had ever seen.

Journeys grew more adventurous. Thomas Stevens, a writer for the San Francisco Chronicle, set off around the world on April 22, 1884, on a 50-inch Columbia with a money belt, a revolver, two shirts and a rain cape, spending two years on the road and writing articles which became a two-volume, 1,021-page book. The feminist Annie Londonderry accomplished her around-the-globe bicycle trip as the first woman as early as 1894–95. John Foster Fraser and two friends set off round the world on safety bicycles in July 1896. They, Edward Lunn and F. H. Lowe rode 19,237 miles, through 17 countries, in two years and two months.

By 1878, recreational cycling was enough established in Britain to lead to formation of the Bicycle Touring Club, later renamed Cyclists' Touring Club. It is the oldest national tourism organisation in the world. Members, like those of other clubs, often rode in uniform. The CTC appointed an official tailor. The uniform was a dark green Devonshire serge jacket, knickerbockers and a "Stanley helmet with a small peak". The colour changed to grey when green proved impractical because it showed the dirt. Groups often rode with a bugler at their head to sound changes of direction or to bring the group to a halt. Confusion could be caused when groups met and mistook each other's signals.

Membership of the CTC inspired the Frenchman, Paul de Vivie (b. April 29, 1853), to found what became the Fédération Française de Cyclotourisme, the world's largest cycling association, and to coin the French word cyclo-tourisme. The League of American Wheelmen in the U.S. was founded in Newport, Rhode Island, on May 30, 1880. It shared an interest in leisure cycling with the administration of cycle racing. Membership peaked at 103,000 in 1898. The primary national bicycle-touring organization in the U.S. is now Adventure Cycling Association. Adventure Cycling, then called Bikecentennial, organised a mass ride in 1976 from one side of the country to the other to mark the nation's 200th anniversary. The Bikecentennial route is still in use as the TransAmerica Bicycle Trail.

== Social significance ==
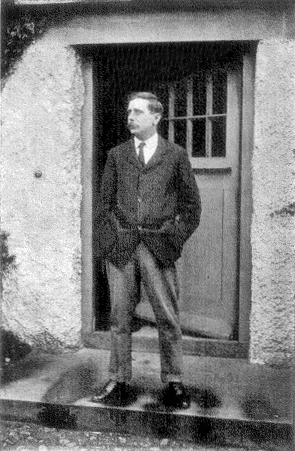
H. G. Wells in 1908 at the door of his house at Sandgate

The first cyclists, often aristocratic or rich, flirted with the bicycle and then abandoned it for the new motor car. It was the lower middle class which profited from cycling and the liberation that it brought. The Cyclist of 13 August 1892 said: "The two sections of the community which form the majority of 'wheelmen' are the great clerk class and the great shop assistant class." H. G. Wells described this aspirant class liberated through cycling. Three of his heroes – in The History of Mr Polly, Kipps and The Wheels of Chance – buy bicycles. The first two work in drapery shops. The third, Hoopdriver, goes on a cycling holiday. The authors Roderick Watson and Martin Gray say:

Hoopdriver is certainly liberated by his machine. It affords him not only a country holiday, in itself a remarkable event which he enjoys immensely, however ignorant of the countryside he may be, but also a brush with a society girl, riding on pneumatics and wearing some kind of Rational Dress.

The book suggests the new social mobility created by the bike, which breaks the boundaries of Hoopdriver's world literally and figuratively. Hoopdriver sets off in a spirit of freedom, finally away from his job:

Only those who toil six long days out of the seven, and all the year round, save for one brief glorious fortnight or ten days in the summer time, know the exquisite sensations of the First Holiday Morning. All the dreary, uninteresting routine drops from you suddenly, your chains fall about your feet...There were thrushes in the Richmond Road, and a lark on Putney Heath. The freshness of dew was in the air; dew or the relics of an overnight shower glittered on the leaves and grass...He wheeled his machine up Putney Hill, and his heart sang within him.

Wells puts Hoopdriver in a new brown cycling suit to show the importance of the venture and the freedom on which he is embarking. Hoopdriver finds the bicycle raises his social standing, at least in his imagination, and he calls to himself as he rides that he's "a bloomin' dook " The New Woman that he pursues wears Rational Dress of a sort that scandalised society but made cycling much easier. The Rational Dress Society was founded in 1881 in London. It said:

The Rational Dress Society protests... against crinolines or crinolettes of any kind as ugly and deforming... [It] requires all to be dressed healthily, comfortably, and beautifully, to seek what conduces to birth, comfort and beauty in our dress as a duty to ourselves and each other.

Both Hoopdriver and the Young Lady in Grey, as he refers to her, are escaping social restraints through bicycle touring. Hoopdriver falls in love and rescues her from a lover who says marrying him is the only way that she, having left alone for a cycling holiday, can save her reputation. She lowers her social status; he raises his. McGurn says: "The shift in social perspectives, as exemplified by Wells' cyclists, led Galsworthy to claim, at a later date, that the bicycle had "been responsible for more movement in manners and morals than anything since Charles the Second."

== Development ==
The bicycle gained from the outdoor movement of the 1930s. The Cyclists' Touring Club advertised a week's all-in tour, staying at hotels recommended by cyclists, for £3 10s. The youth hostel movement started in Germany and spread abroad, and a cycling holiday staying at hostels in the 1930s could be had for £2. Roderick Watson and Martin Gray estimate there were ten million bicycles in Britain to one million cars.

A decline set in across Europe, particularly in Britain, when millions of servicemen returned from World War II having learned to drive. Trips away were now, for the increasing number who had one, by car. The decline in the United States came even sooner. McGurn says:

The story of interwar cycling was characterised by lack of interest and a steady decline... Cycling had lost out to the automobile, and to some extent to the new electric transport systems. In the 1930s cumbersome, fat-tyred 'balloon bombers', bulbously streamlined in imitation of motorcycles or aeroplanes, appealed to American children: the only mass market still open to cycle manufacturers. Wartime austerity gave cycling a short reprieve in the industrial world. The post-war peace was to lay the bicycle low.

However, between 1965 and 1975 the U.S. experienced a bike boom. In 1976, to celebrate the bicentennial of the founding of the United States, Greg Siple, his wife June, and Dan and Lys Burden organized a mass bike ride, Bikecentennial, from the Pacific to the Atlantic. Siple said:

My original thought was to send out ads and flyers saying, 'Show up at Golden Gate Park in San Francisco at 9 o'clock on June 1 with your bicycle.' And then we were going to bicycle across the country. I pictured thousands of people, a sea of people with their bikes and packs all ready to go, and there would be old men and people with balloon-tire bikes and Frenchmen who flew over just for this. Nobody would shoot a gun off or anything. At 9 o'clock everybody would just start moving. It would be like this crowd of locusts crossing America.

The ride eventually ran from Astoria, Oregon, to Yorktown, Virginia, site of the first British settlements; 4,100 rode, with 2,000 completing the entire route. It defined a new start for cycle-touring in the United States and led to the creation of Adventure Cycling Association. Adventure Cycling has mapped routes across America and into Canada, many of the rides taking up to three months to complete on a loaded bicycle.

In Britain, the Cyclists Touring Club grew to 70,000 members by 2011 and is now the biggest body campaigning for cycling and cyclists' rights in the UK. It continues to organise group touring events including day rides through its local groups and CTC holidays in many countries led by experienced CTC members. Since 1983, Sustrans has created a National Cycle Network of long-distance cycle routes including back roads and traffic-free tracks built, signed, and mapped in partnership with local organisations.

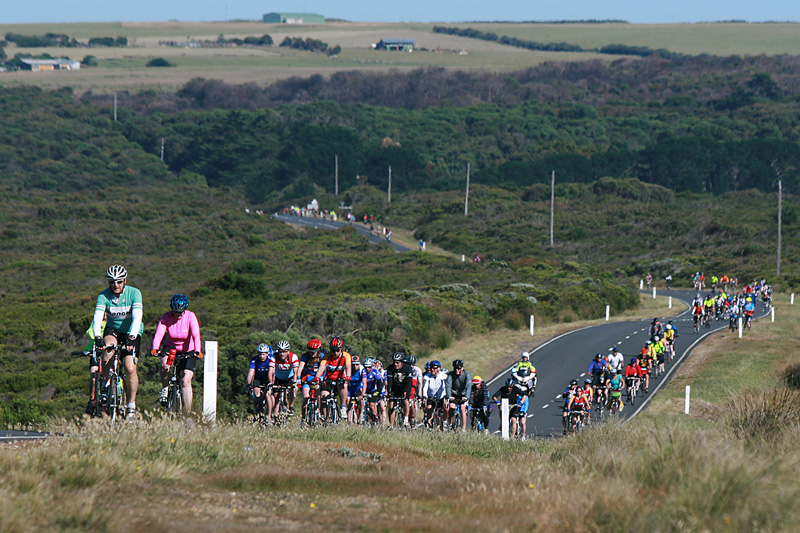
Supported bicycle touring holidays, such as the nine-day Great Victorian Bike Ride in Australia, can attract thousands of riders

Since 1980, there has been a growth of organised cycling holidays provided by commercial organisations in many countries. Some companies provide accommodation and route information to cyclists travelling independently; others focus on a group experience, including guides and support for a large number of riders cycling together. A variation on this is holidays, often in exotic locations, organised in partnership with a charity, in which participants are expected to raise donations as well as cover their costs. Due to the rise of hospitality exchange services from the nineties on, cycle travelers like other travelers got the means to better organize their stays at local hosts. The hospitality exchange website Warm Showers, which is specialized for cycle travelers started in 2005 and has over 100000 members worldwide today.

The scale of bicycle touring and its economic effects are difficult to estimate, given the activity's informal nature. Market research indicates that in 2006 British cyclists spent £120m on 450,000 organised cycling holidays, and a further 2.5 million people included some cycling activity in their annual holiday that year. The total economic benefit to communities visited during the nine-day long Great Victorian Bike Ride was estimated at AU$2 million in 2011, which does not include costs paid directly to ride organisers and ongoing benefits to towns. Sustrans estimate that the total value of cycle tourism in the UK in 1997 was £635m and they forecast £14bn for the whole EU by 2020. Among examples of current activity given by Sustrans are 1.5m cyclists using the 250 kilometres (160 mi) Danube Cycle Route each year and 25% of holiday visitors in Germany using bicycles during their visit.

== Voyages ==
Bicycle touring can be of any distance and duration. The French tourist Jacques Sirat speaks in lectures of how he felt proud riding round the world for five years – until he met an Australian who had been on the road for 27 years. The German rider, Walter Stolle, lost his home and living in the Sudetenland in the aftermath of World War II, settled in Britain and set off from Essex on 25 January 1959, to cycle round the world. He rode through 159 countries in 18 years, denied only those with sealed borders. He paid his way by giving slide shows in seven languages. He gave 2,500 such shows at US$100 per performance. In 1974, he rode through Nigeria, Dahomey, Upper Volta, Ghana, Leone, Ivory Coast, Liberia and Guinea. He was robbed 231 times, wore out six bicycles and had five more stolen.

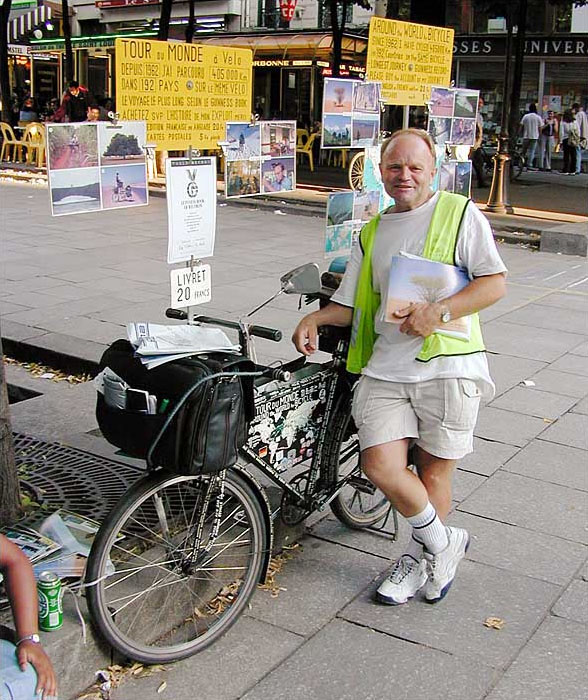
Heinz Stücke in Paris, 1999

Heinz Stücke left his job as a die-maker in North Rhine-Westphalia in 1962 when he was 22 — three years after Stolle and is still riding. By 2006 he had cycled more than 539,000 km (335,000 mi) and visited 192 countries. He pays his way by selling photographs to magazines. From Asia, Gua Dahao left China in May 1999 to ride across Siberia, the Middle East, Turkey, western Europe, Scandinavia, then another 100,000 km across Africa, Latin America and Australia.

Others attempt long voyages in exceptionally short time periods. The current circumnavigation record by bicycle is 78 days 14 hours, and 40 minutes by Mark Beaumont.

Noted writers have combined cycling with travel writing including Dervla Murphy, who made her first documented journey in 1963, from London to India, on a single speed bicycle with little more than a revolver and a change of underwear. In 2006, she described how, aged 74, she was held up at gunpoint and robbed while cycling in Russia. Eric Newby, Bettina Selby, and Anne Mustoe have all used cycling as a means to a literary end, valuing the way that cycling brings the traveller closer to people and places. Selby said,

(the bicycle) makes me independent in a way no other form of transport can - it needs no fuel, no documents and very little maintenance. Most importantly it goes along at the right speed for seeing everything, and as it doesn't cut me off from my surroundings, it also makes me a lot of friends.

In recent years, British adventurers Alastair Humphreys (Moods of Future Joys), Mark Beaumont (The Man who Cycled the World), and Rob Lilwall (Cycling Home From Siberia) have all been on bicycle expeditions and written books about their exploits.

One economic implication of bicycling is that it liberates the cyclist from oil consumption. The bicycle is an inexpensive, fast, healthy and environmentally friendly mode of transport. Ivan Illich said that bicycling extends the usable physical environment for people, while alternatives such as cars and motorways degrade and confined people's environment and mobility.

The website crazyguyonabike.com includes thousands of rider-generated journals of cycling tours globally.

== Types ==
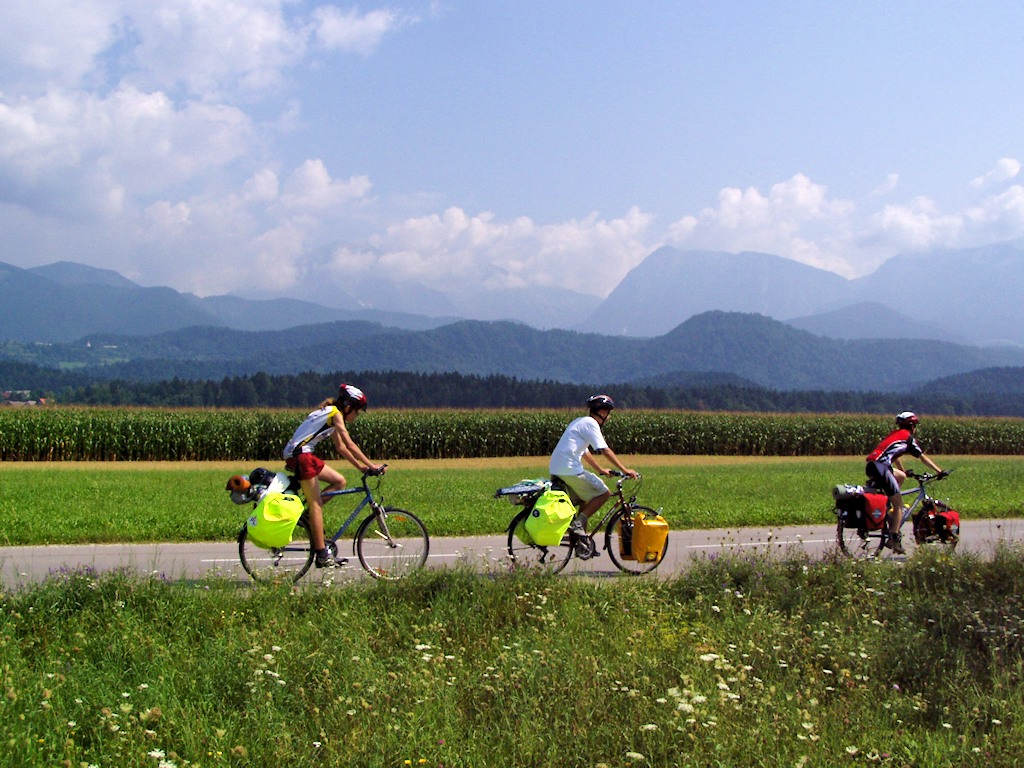
Trio of cyclists with panniers on a tour in Slovenia.

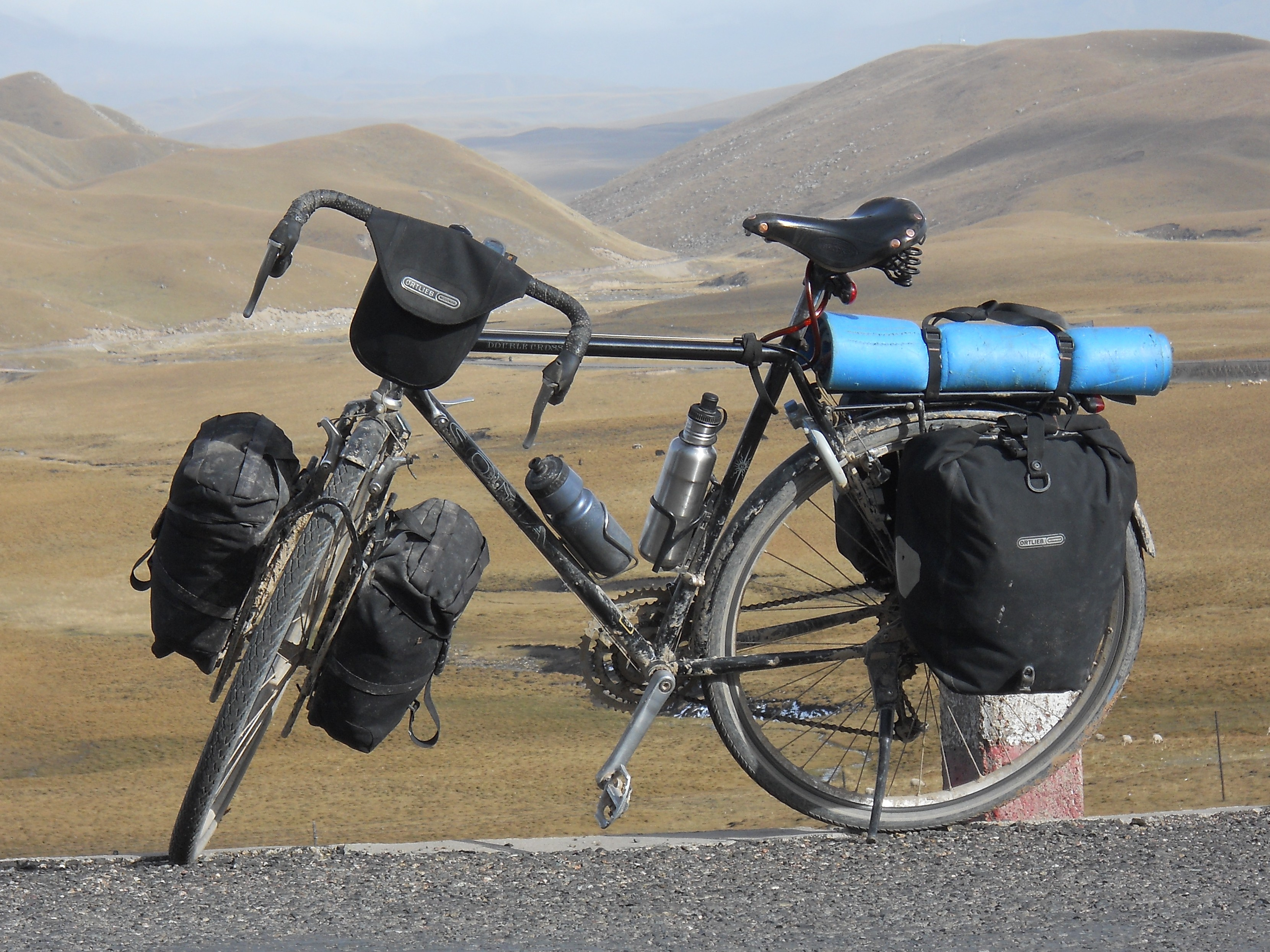
A loaded touring bicycle, with drop bars, 700c wheels, racks panniers and bar bag.

Hybrid bicycle with lightweight touring gear and a MOLLE backpack	Hybrid bicycle beside a pitched lightweight tent
Ultralight touring setup with camping gear and supplies carried by bicycle and rider	Bicycle and pitched lightweight tent after unloading the touring gear

Distances vary considerably. Depending on fitness, speed and the number of stops, the rider usually covers between 50–150 kilometres (31–93 mi) per day. A short tour over a few days may cover as little as 200 kilometres (120 mi) and a long tour may go right across a country or around the world. Riders may also unload their camping equipment at a campsite, allowing them to ride locally without carrying their touring gear.

Food and drinks may be purchased along the route rather than carried for the entire trip. Many cyclists prefer for the bike to carry all the gear and forgo the need for a backpack. However some cyclists prefer a backpack as it's a convenient way to store most of their stuff in one place and to provide relatively significant carrying capacity. Additionally, a backpack can keep delicate electronics, like cameras, on the rider's body, reducing their exposure to the bicycle's vibrations. However a large or heavy backpack can make cycling more challenging by affecting the balance and comfort of the rider. There are many different types of bicycle touring:

Lightweight touring
Informally called credit-card touring, a rider carries a minimum of equipment and generally no camping gear, relying instead on paid accommodation such as youth hostels, hotels, pensions or B&Bs. Food is bought at cafes, restaurants or markets.
Ultralight touring
Differs from credit-card touring in that the rider is more self-sufficient and carries only the bare essentials and no frills, including a lightweight tent, sleeping bag, and sleeping pad.
Fully loaded touring
Also known as self-supported touring, cyclists carry everything they need, including food, cooking equipment, and a tent for camping. Some cyclists minimize their load, carrying only basic supplies, food, and a Bivouac shelter or lightweight tent.
Expedition touring
Cyclists travel extensively, often through developing nations or remote areas. The bicycle is loaded with food, spares, tools, and camping equipment so that the traveller is largely self-supporting.
Mixed Terrain Cycle-Touring / Bikepacking
Also called rough riding, cyclists travel over a variety of surfaces and topography on a single route. Focusing on freedom of travel and efficiency over varied surfaces, cyclists often adopt an ultralight camping approach and carry their own minimal gear (bikepacking).
Supported touring
Cyclists are supported by a motor vehicle, which carries most equipment. This can be organized independently by groups of cyclists or commercial holiday companies. These companies sell places on guided tours, including booked lodging, luggage transfers, route planning and often meals and rental bikes.
Day touring
These rides vary highly in their size of the group, length, purpose, and methods of support. They may involve solo cyclists, group rides, or large organized rides with hundreds to thousands of riders. Their length can range from a few miles to century rides of 100 miles (160 km) or longer. Their purpose can range from riding for pleasure or fitness, to raising money for a charitable organization. Methods of support can include self-supported day rides, rides supported by friends or small groups, and organized rides where cyclists pay for support and accommodation provided by event organizers, including rest and refreshment stops, marshalling to aid safety, and sag services.
S24O
The Sub-24-hour Overnight, or S24O, is focused less on cycling and more on camping. Typically, one would depart on their bicycle in the late afternoon or evening, ride to a campsite in a few hours, make camp, sleep, and then ride home or even to work the next morning. This type can require very little planning or time commitment. If one lives in a large urban metropolis, this sort of trip might also be extended, taking a train or coach to get to a more convenient starting point, and may in fact take a lot longer than 24 hours, making it a weekend tour, otherwise still works on the same planning principles. As a term, "S240" was coined by Grant Petersen of Rivendell Bicycle Works.

City Bike Tours

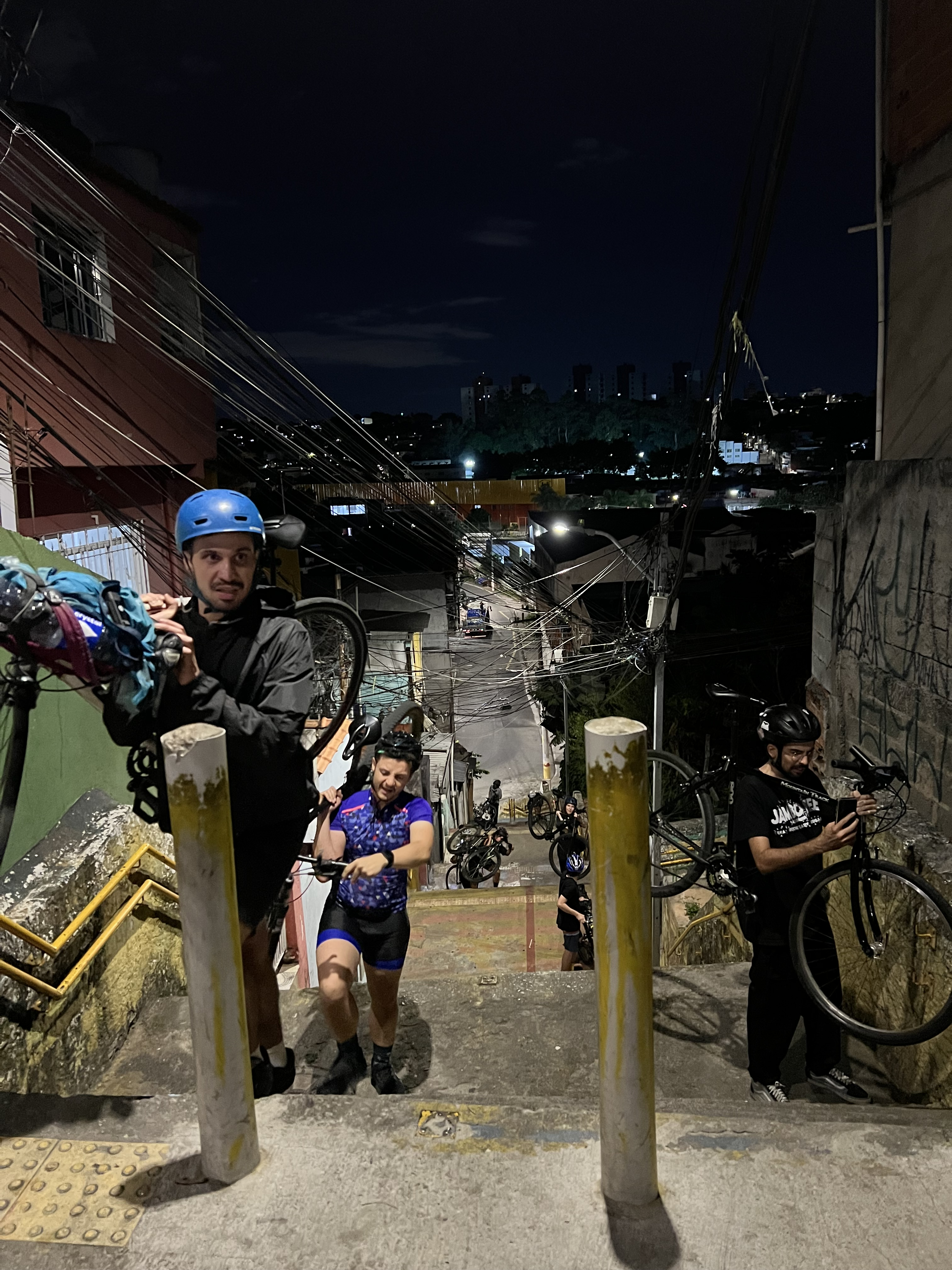
City bike tour in São Paulo, on the neighborhood of Pirituba

City bike tours are cycling excursions designed for urban exploration. Unlike long-distance bicycle touring, city bike tours are shorter in duration (usually 2-4 hours) and cater to a wide range of participants, including casual cyclists and tourists.

They often include stops at historical sites, local markets, and scenic viewpoints. Some tours focus on specific themes, such as street art, food tastings, historical narratives or geographical features (such as the Pedal Hidrográfico tour in São Paulo).

City bike tours contribute to sustainable tourism by promoting cycling as an eco-friendly alternative to motorized transportation. They are commonly offered by local tour companies, bike rental services, and municipal initiatives aiming to encourage cycling culture. It is also common for them to be organized informally or spontaneously by amateur cyclists.

== Touring bike ==
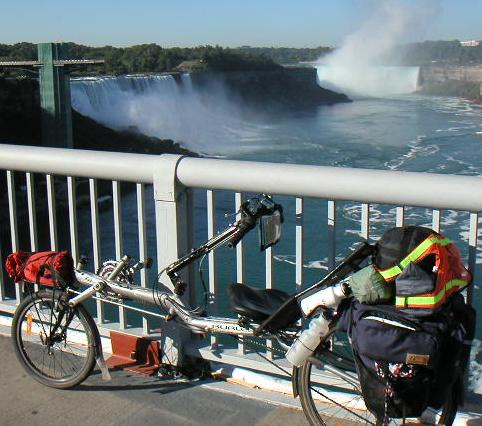
Fully loaded touring Sinbent

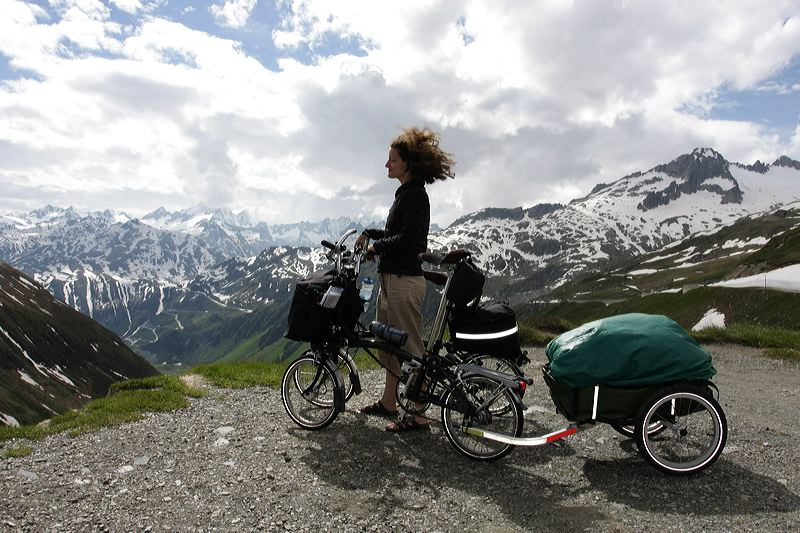
Two-wheel trailer

Cycle touring beyond the range of a day trip may need a bike capable of carrying heavy loads. Although many different bicycles can be used, specialist touring bikes are built to carry appropriate loads and to be ridden more comfortably over long distances.

A typical bicycle would have a longer wheelbase for stability and heel clearance, frame fittings for front and rear pannier racks, additional water bottle mounts, frame fittings for front and rear mudguards/fenders, a broader range of gearing to cope with the increased weight, and touring tires which are wider to provide more comfort on backroads. "Ultralight tourers" choose traditional road bicycles or "Audax" or randonneur bicycles for speed and simplicity. However, these bikes are harder to ride on unmade roads, which may limit route options. Since about 2015, gravel bikes are a new option to combine speed and unpaved road capabilities. For some, the advantages of a recumbent bicycle are particularly relevant to touring. To lessen the weight carried on the bicycle, or increase luggage capacity, touring cyclists may use bicycle trailers. For a "supported" rider, luggage carrying is not important and a wider range of bicycle types may be suitable depending on the terrain.

== Navigation ==
There are many navigation tools for bicycle touring, including smartphone apps, websites, and dedicated tools such as a GPS navigation device. As riding is typically done at extended periods without access to a power source, GPS navigation devices that are typically powered by replaceable batteries can be advantageous compared to smartphones.

GPS-based navigation may sometimes lead to impassible terrain or a dead trail; in such cases, most bicycle tourers simply backtrack and try another route.

== Noted bicycle tourists ==
=== Female bicycle tourists ===
- Anne Mustoe
- Annie Londonderry
- Dervla Murphy
- Josie Dew
- Kate Leeming
- Sunil Kaushik and Yuka Yokozawa
- Agnieszka, also known as 'wheels on a bike'

=== Male bicycle tourists ===
- Alastair Humphreys
- Iohan Gueorguiev
- Algirdas Gurevičius
- Heinz Stücke
- Ian Hibell
- Mark Beaumont
- Mikael Strandberg
- Pushkar Shah
- Rob Lilwall
- Thomas Stevens
- Sunil Kaushik and Yuka Yokozawa

== In fiction ==
Examples of fictional works featuring bicycle tours include:

- The Bike Tour Mystery (2002) by Carolyn Keene, Nancy Drew Mystery Stories No. 168
- The Wheels of Chance (1896) by H.G. Wells

== See also ==
- Audax (cycling)
- Bicycling and feminism
- Bicycle Ride Across Georgia
- Bicycle Ride Across Nebraska
- Bicycle safety
- Challenge riding
- Cycleway
- Cyclists' Touring Club
- EuroVelo
- Great Victorian Bike Ride
- League of American Bicyclists
- Long-distance cycling route
- Mixed Terrain Cycle-Touring
- National cycling route network
- National Route 40 (Argentina)
- Pacific Crest Bicycle Trail
- RAGBRAI
- Rail trail
- Trail riding
- Utility cycling
- Warm Showers
- Trekking
- Overlanding
- Motorcycle touring
- Long-distance horse riding
- Sunil Kaushik and Yuka Yokozawa
