= Trailer bike =

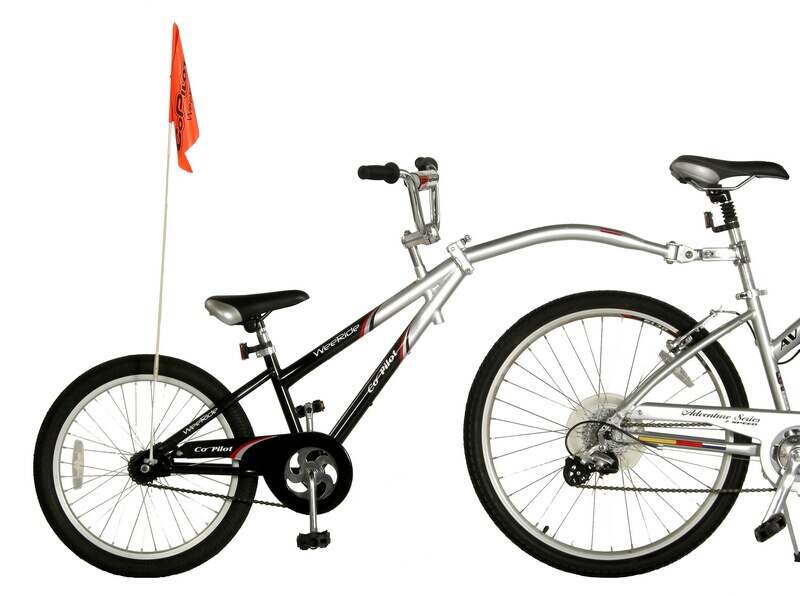
Side view of a single-speed, seatpost mounted trailer bike

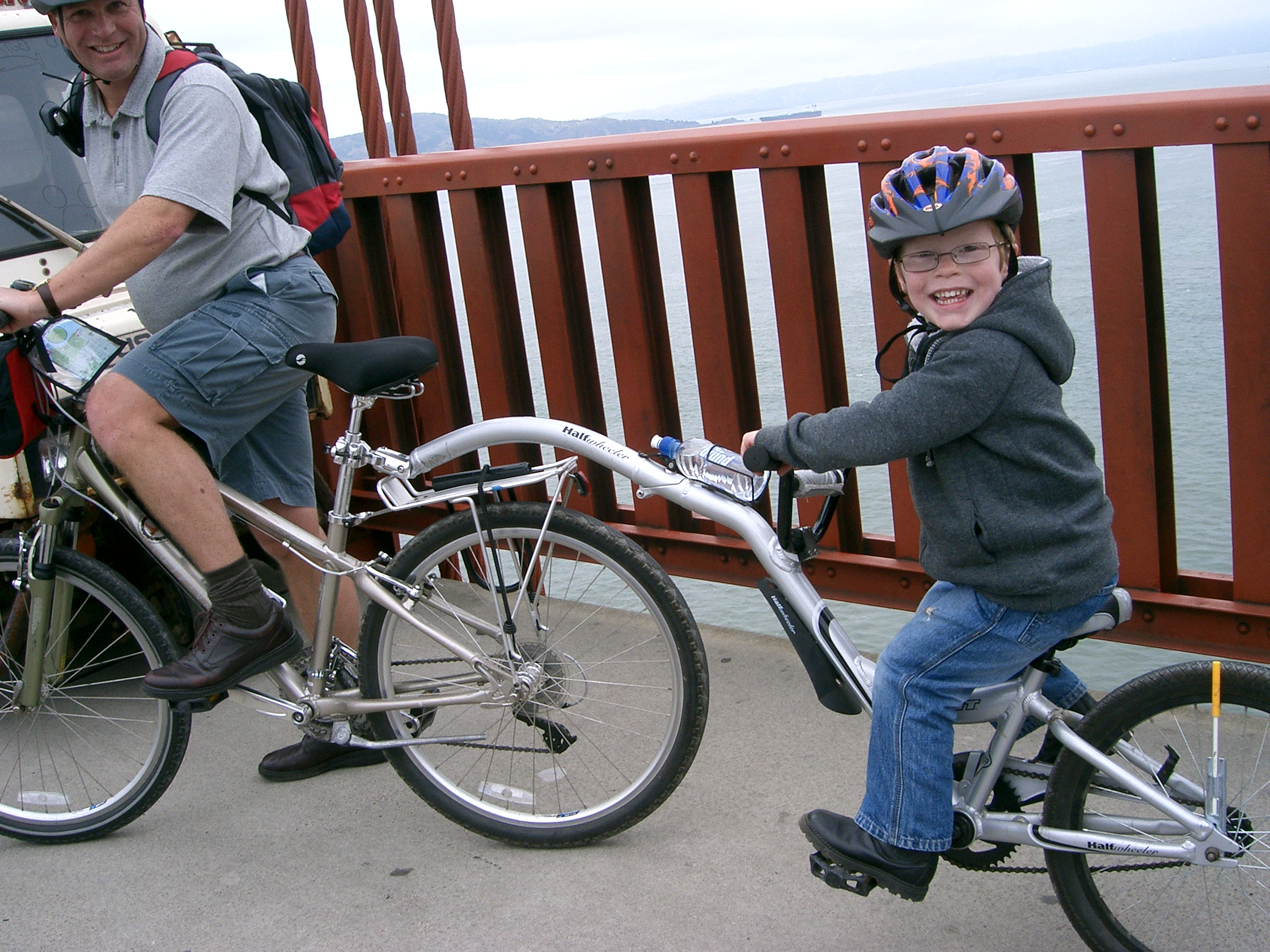
A single-speed trailer bike from Half wheeler, also attached at the seat post

A trailer bike (also known as a trailer cycle, and trademarked names such as Trailerbike, Trail-a-bike, Half wheeler or Tagalong) is a one-wheeled, or sometimes two-wheeled, bicycle trailer designed to carry one or more children in positions that closely resemble that of a bicycle rider. It can be described as the, "back half of a bicycle." The rider of a trailer bike usually has a saddle, handlebars, and pedals. Some fold for more compact storage.

== History ==
The trailer bike was patented by Canadian entrepreneur Delbert Adams in 1987. Adams started the manufacturer of trailer bikes, Trail-a-Bike, and began selling them in the early 1990s, although the same concept had been previously independently and imitatively invented by others at least as far back as the 1930s with the Rann Trailer.

== Configurations ==
Trailer bikes have come in a variety of configurations. These include upright-bicycle-like seating, and recumbent-bicycle-like seating as with the Weehoo iGo. Trailer bikes have been available in single-seat and tandem configurations. Trailer bikes may have just one gear or more than one. They seldom have brakes.

== Attachment methods ==
A trailer bike is attached to a bicycle at either the seatpost or on a special rear rack by a linkage that allows for pivoting. Alternatively, the hitch mechanism may rotate using the seatpost as the pivot. The attachment may include a quick-release option.

== Conversion sets ==
The Trail-Gator tow bar and FollowMe Tandem coupling are two products that convert an existing, complete kid's bike into a trailer bike.

== Gallery ==
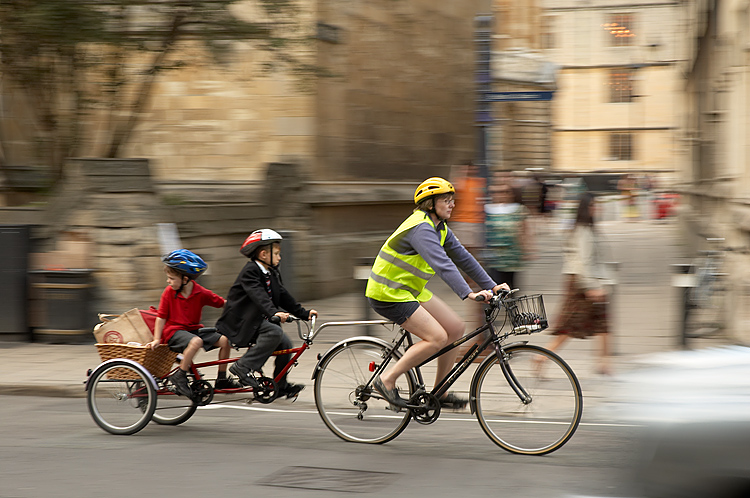
Adult and two children cycling using two-wheeled tandem trailer bike (a Pashley U+2)

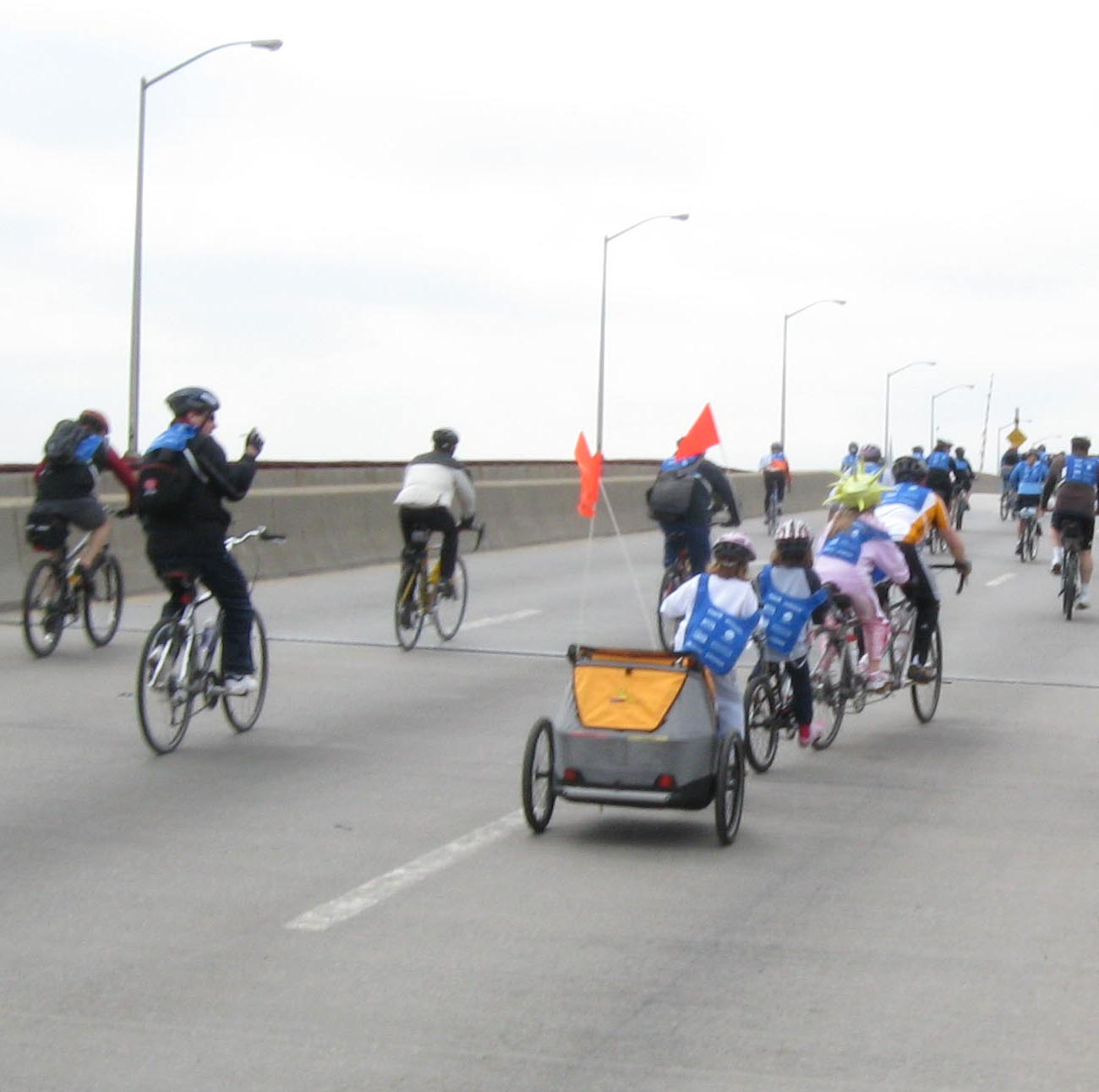
Tandem + two trailer bikes + cargo trailer for family of four

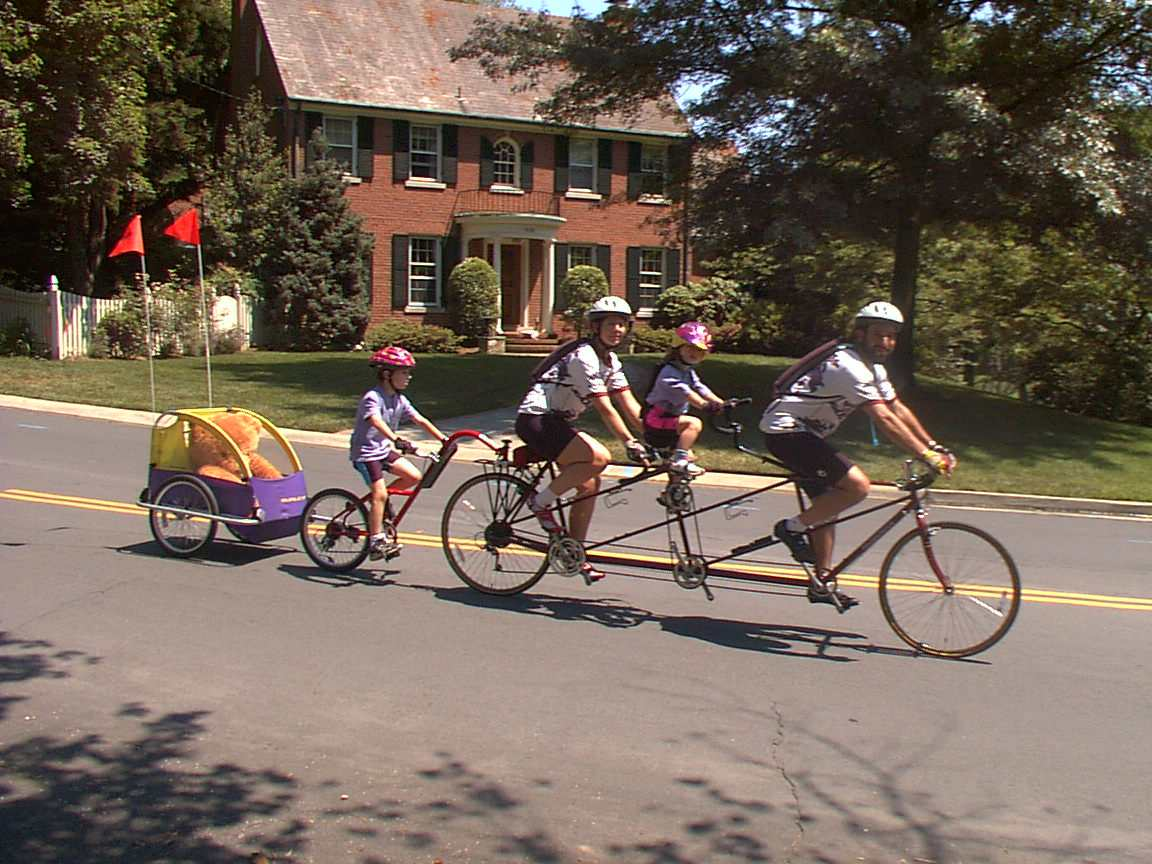
A Burley Piccolo behind a triple tandem

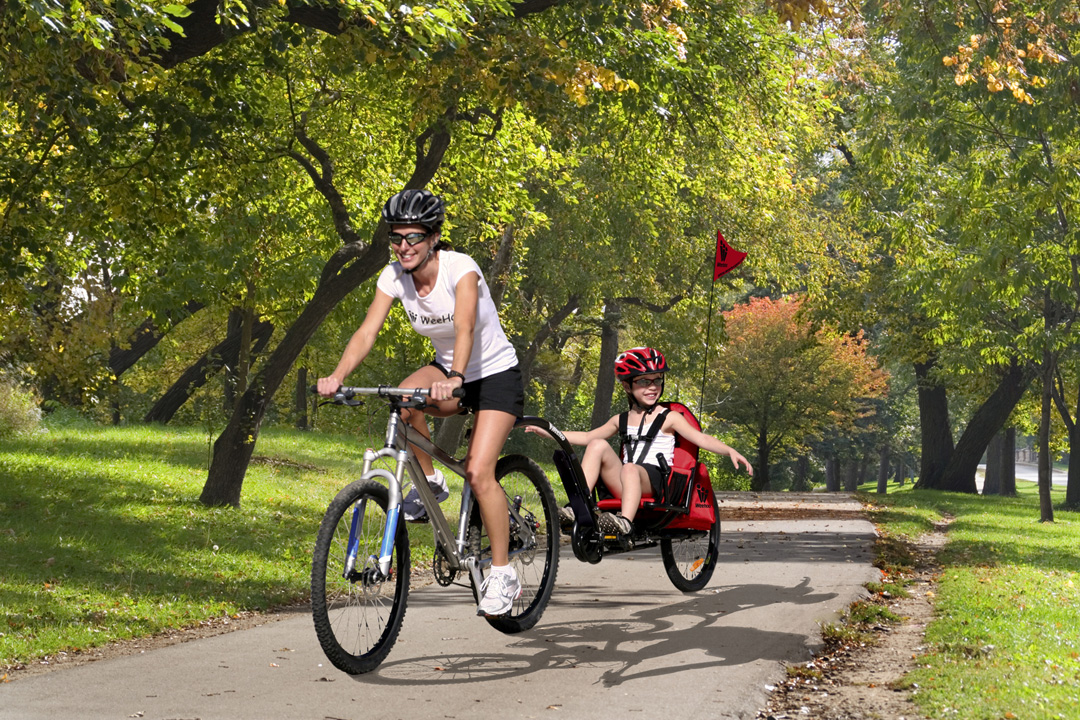
A recumbent IGo by Weehoo

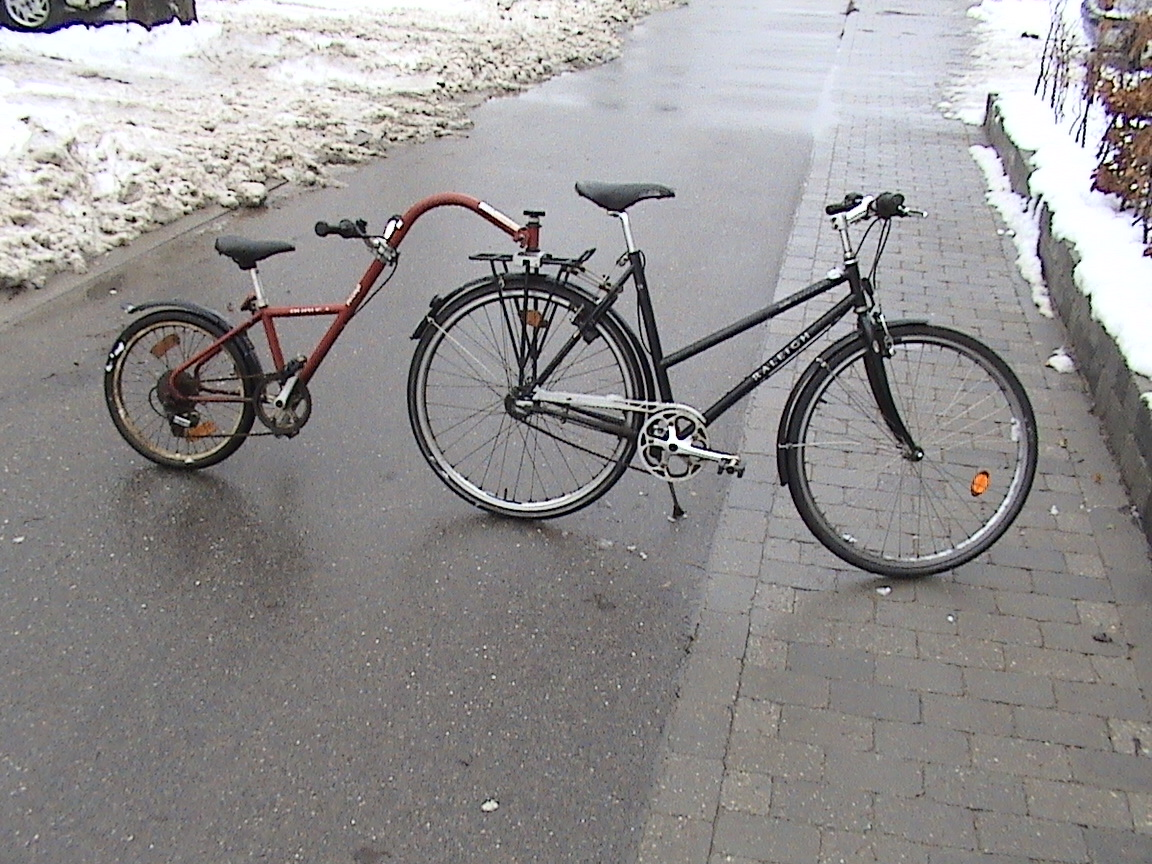
Rear rack attachment as alternative to seatpost attachment

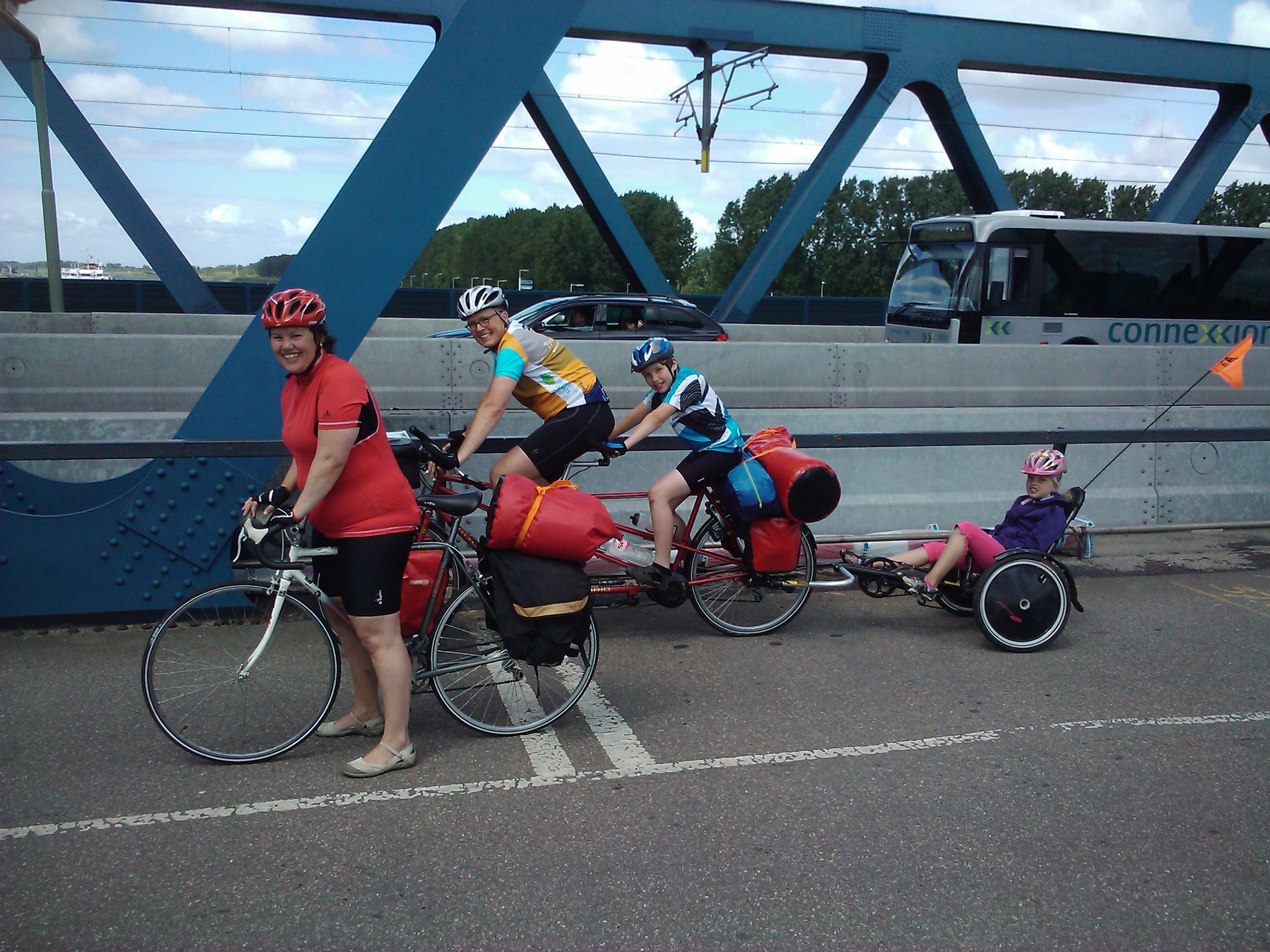
A recumbent two-wheeled Trets trailer bike by Hase on the back of a tandem

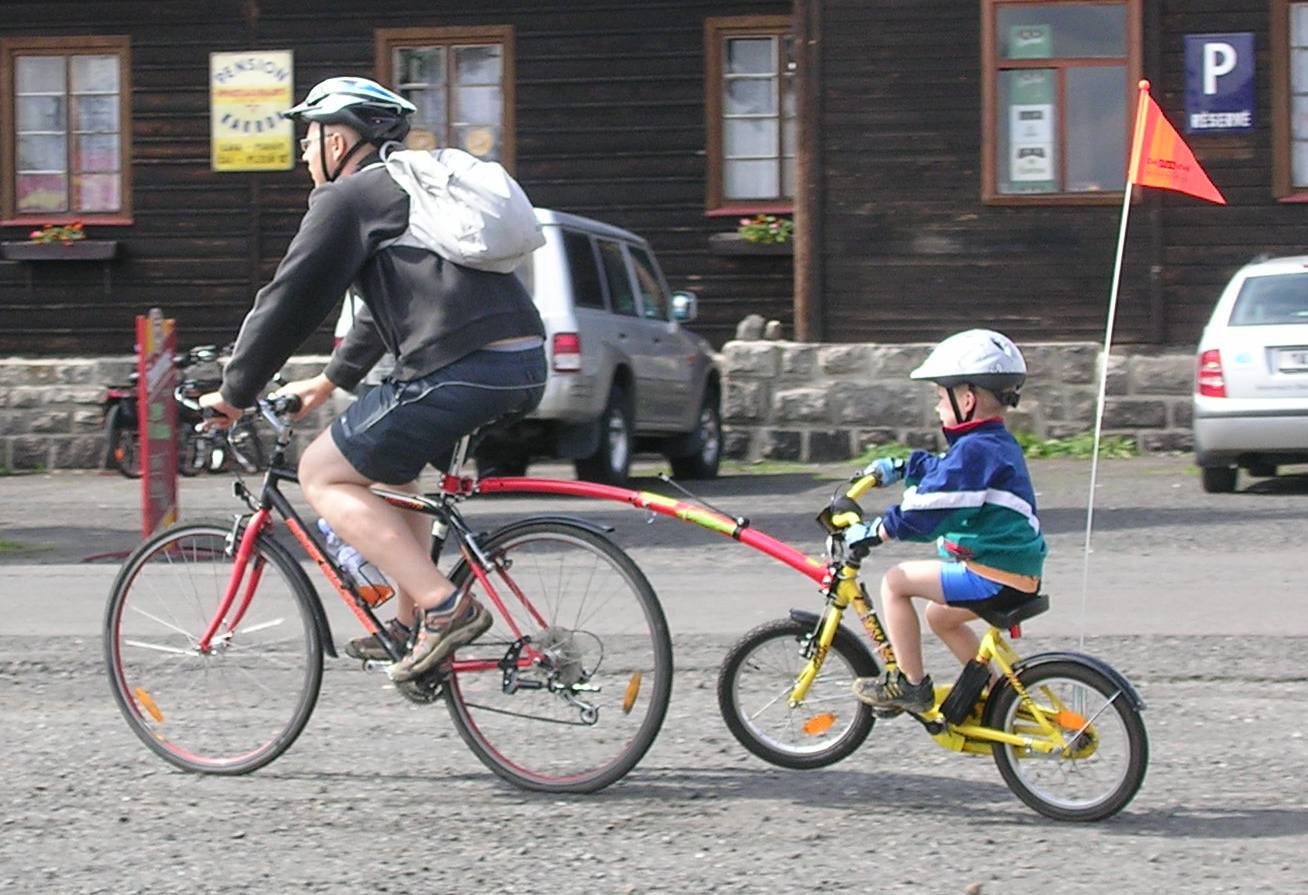
A complete child's bike converted into a trailer bike

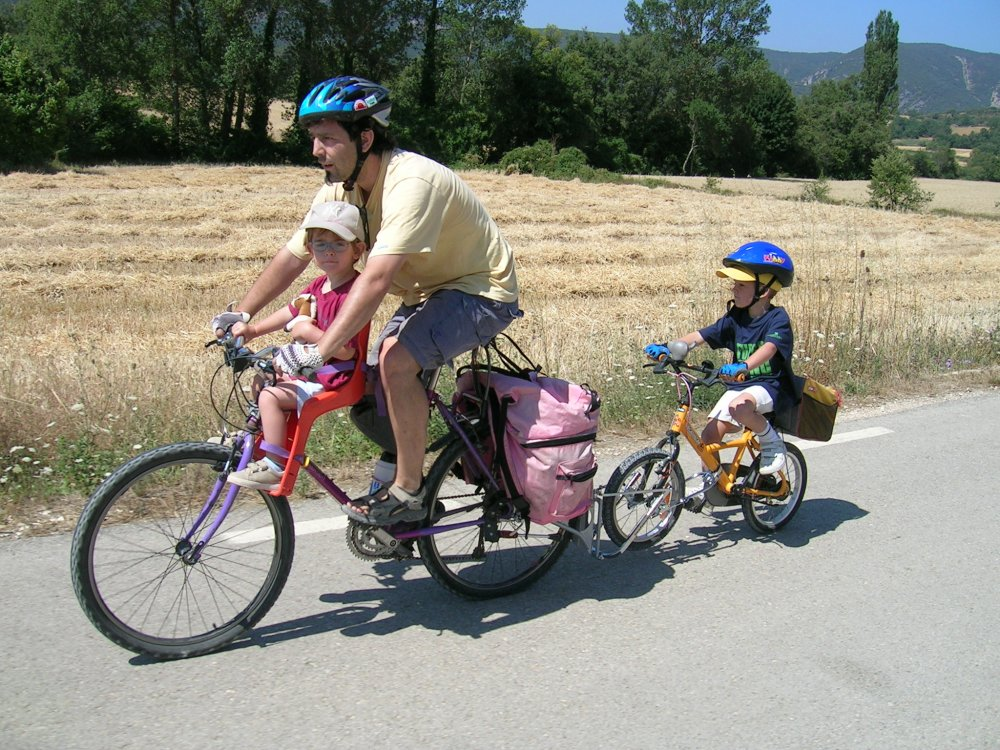
A complete child's bike converted into a trailer bike

== See also ==
- Outline of cycling
- Quadracycle (human-powered vehicle)
- Tandem bicycle
- Tricycle
