= Makaibari =

Makaibari मकैबारी
- Village development committee
- Country: Nepal
- Zone: Janakpur Zone
- District: Dolakha District

Population (1991)
  - Total: 3,744
- Time zone: UTC+5:45 (Nepal Time)

Makaibari is a village development committee in Dolakha District in the Janakpur Zone of north-eastern Nepal. At the time of the 1991 Nepal census it had a population of 3,744 people living in 788 individual households.

== Noted residents ==
- Pushkar Shah
