= Josie Dew =

English cyclist, author and cook

- Born: 7 January 1966 (age 60)
- Occupations: Cyclist, author, cook
- Notable work: Wind in my Wheels, Long Cloud Ride

Josie Dew (born 1966) is an English touring cyclist, author and cook. Although a caterer by profession she frequently takes long cycle trips (such as circumnavigating Britain or Japan – or crossing the Sahara on her bicycle whilst suffering kidney problems) and then writes a humorous travelogue detailing her experiences. She lives near Portsmouth, England. She has two daughters and a son.

She began to use cooking to pay for her cycling trips at the age of 15 and by 17 it had paid for her first significant trip, around the coast of Britain, inspired by a tour of the Isle of Wight when she was 10. By September 2005, she had cycled through 48 countries and by 2010 she had covered more than 350,000 miles.

She crossed Europe with her boyfriend, which led to her first writing success, Wind in my Wheels. After her boyfriend was injured in a crash she began travelling alone, which she prefers, despite those who find it strange.

In March 2007, Long Cloud Ride, her book about New Zealand, was selected among the top 10 writer's reads by Geographical.

== Books ==
- The Wind in My Wheels: Travel Tales from the Saddle (1992)
- Travels in a Strange State: Cycling Across the U.S.A. (1994)
- A Ride in the Neon Sun: A Gaijin in Japan (1999)
- The Sun in My Eyes: Two-Wheeling East (2001), ISBN 978-0-7515-3018-6
- Slow Coast Home: 5,000 Miles Around the Shores of England and Wales (2003)
- Saddled at Sea: A 15,000-mile journey to New Zealand by Russian freighter (2006)
- A Long Cloud Ride: A Cycling Adventure Across New Zealand (2007), ISBN 978-1-8474-4014-3
