= Iohan Gueorguiev =

Bulgarian Canadian long-distance bikepacker (1988–2021)

- Born: 20 January 1988; Bulgaria
- Died: 19 August 2021 (aged 33); Cranbrook, British Columbia, Canada
- Citizenship: Canadian
- Occupations: Cyclist, photographer, writer
- Known for: Cycling from Alaska to Argentina
- Website: www.bikewanderer.com

Iohan Gueorguiev (20 January 1988 – 19 August 2021) was a Bulgarian Canadian long-distance bikepacker from Mississauga, Ontario, Canada. He was known for cycling from Canada's Arctic Circle to El Chalten, Argentina which he completed in six years from 2014 to 2020 and for documenting his cycling adventures in his YouTube channel The Bike Wanderer.

== Biography ==
According to his website The Bike Wanderer, Gueorguiev was born and raised in Bulgaria. At age 15, his parents sent him to live with an uncle in Mississauga, Ontario, Canada to search for better opportunities. In his 20s, he studied engineering for about two years at McMaster University in Hamilton, Ontario. In April 2014, he began cycling from Alaska down to Canada's Northwest Territories following the Arctic Circle and documented his ordeal on his YouTube channel. He left his studies in the university in 2015 after he was accepted as a recipient of a sponsorship and stipend from the bicycle company Blackburn as part of its Out There program, which involves the selection of six or seven ambassadors known as the Blackburn Rangers. That year, he cycled the Great Divide Mountain Bike Route from Canada to New Mexico as part of Blackburn's Out There program.

After completing the cycle tour of the Great Divide Mountain Bike Route, he continued cycling through Central and South America, eventually reaching El Chalten, Argentina in 2020. Along the way, he was named one of the Ambassadors of the Year by the cycling website Bikepacking.com. In February 2020, he attempted to hike Ojos del Salado, the highest mountain in Chile.

During the onset of the COVID-19 pandemic in March 2020, Gueorguiev returned to Canada and was unable to travel due to border restrictions. This prevented him from cycling and creating new content for his over 97,000 subscribers on his YouTube channel, and he developed depression as a result.

That year, he was diagnosed with insomnia caused by central sleep apnea, which contributed to his depression. During this time, largely unable to travel, a battle with latent insomnia took its toll on his psyche.

== Death ==
Gueorguiev died by suicide on 19 August 2021 in Cranbrook, British Columbia, Canada.
