= Anne Mustoe =

British cyclist and writer

Anne Mustoe (24 May 1933 – 10 November 2009) was an English schoolteacher, a touring cyclist, author of travel books and former headmistress of Saint Felix School, Southwold, Suffolk. She fell ill and died in a hospital in Aleppo, Syria on 10 November 2009.

She was married to Nelson Edwin Mustoe QC (1896–1976). Her stepson, Julian Mustoe, completed a circumnavigation of the globe (2001–2012) following the route of HMS Beagle.

== Publications ==
- A Bike Ride: 12,000 Miles Around the World (1991) ISBN 1-85227-337-2
- Cleopatra's Needle: Two Wheels by the Water to Cairo (2003) ISBN 1-85227-984-2
- Lone Traveller: One Woman, Two Wheels and the World (1998) ISBN 1-85310-970-3
- Che Guevara and the Mountain of Silver: By Bicycle and Train Through South America (2007) ISBN 0-7535-1274-2
- Two Wheels in the Dust: From Kathmandu to Kandy (2001) ISBN 1-85227-926-5
- Amber, Furs and Cockleshells: Bike Rides with Pilgrims and Merchants (2005) ISBN 0-7535-0983-0
- Escaping the Winter (1993) ISBN 0-7535-0825-7
