= Pushkar Shah =

- Notable work: Cycled more than 150 countries of the world alone.

Pushkar Shah is a Nepalese peace and democracy activist and adventurer. On November 29, 1998 he set off from Dolakha Town, Nepal at the age of 25, for a world bicycle trek. His goal was to spread a message of peace and hope. He has cycled around 150 different countries.

Pushkar poses in front of his bicycle that took him around the world. To mark his one hundredth country, he visited Egypt to see The Great Pyramids.

== Early life ==
Shah hails from a Nepalese farming family from the Makaibari Village Development Committee of Dolakha District. His father served in the Indian Gorkha Regiment.

== Freedom fighter ==
He was a freedom fighter and was shot during the 1990 People's Movement. His stated motivations were to establish peace, democracy, human rights, freedom of expression and rule of law against the autocratic Panchayat regime. He was arrested and imprisoned many times.

== Cycling journey ==
With only a bicycle, 60 kg of essentials and a 100 Nepali Rupees (NR) from his mother, he started his journey in November 1998 from a small village in Dolakha, aiming to circumnavigate the world.

He carried with him messages of peace from Nepal and collected national flags from whichever country he travelled to. On 7 April 2010, he attempted climbing Mount Everest with his collection of flags from around the world. He successfully topped on 17 May 2010.

While in New Zealand, he met Sir Edmund Hillary. However, during his visit, his bicycle was stolen. On learning about this, Hillary bought him a new bicycle. In another incident in Barbados, Pushkar was attacked with a knife while sleeping. When he was in Mexico, he was kidnapped and taken 180 km inside a jungle. He assaulted his captors and escaped, without knowing their motivations.
