= Hase Spezialräder =

German special bicycle manufacturing company

- Type: Private
- Industry: Bicycles
- Founded: 1994
- Headquarters: Waltrop, North Rhine-Westphalia, Germany
- Key people: Marec hase
- Products: Bicycle and Related Components
- Website: www.hasebikes.com

Hase Spezialräder, also known as Hase Bikes, is a German tricycle, tandem, and recumbent factory founded in 1994 in Bochum by Marec Hase.

Extraschicht, a yearly cultural event of the Ruhr region takes places, simultaneously with other locations, in the old Waltrop's mine building, now head office of the company.

Hase Bikes holds the Guinness Book of Records record for the longest tandem in the world, with 93 riders and more than 150m long.

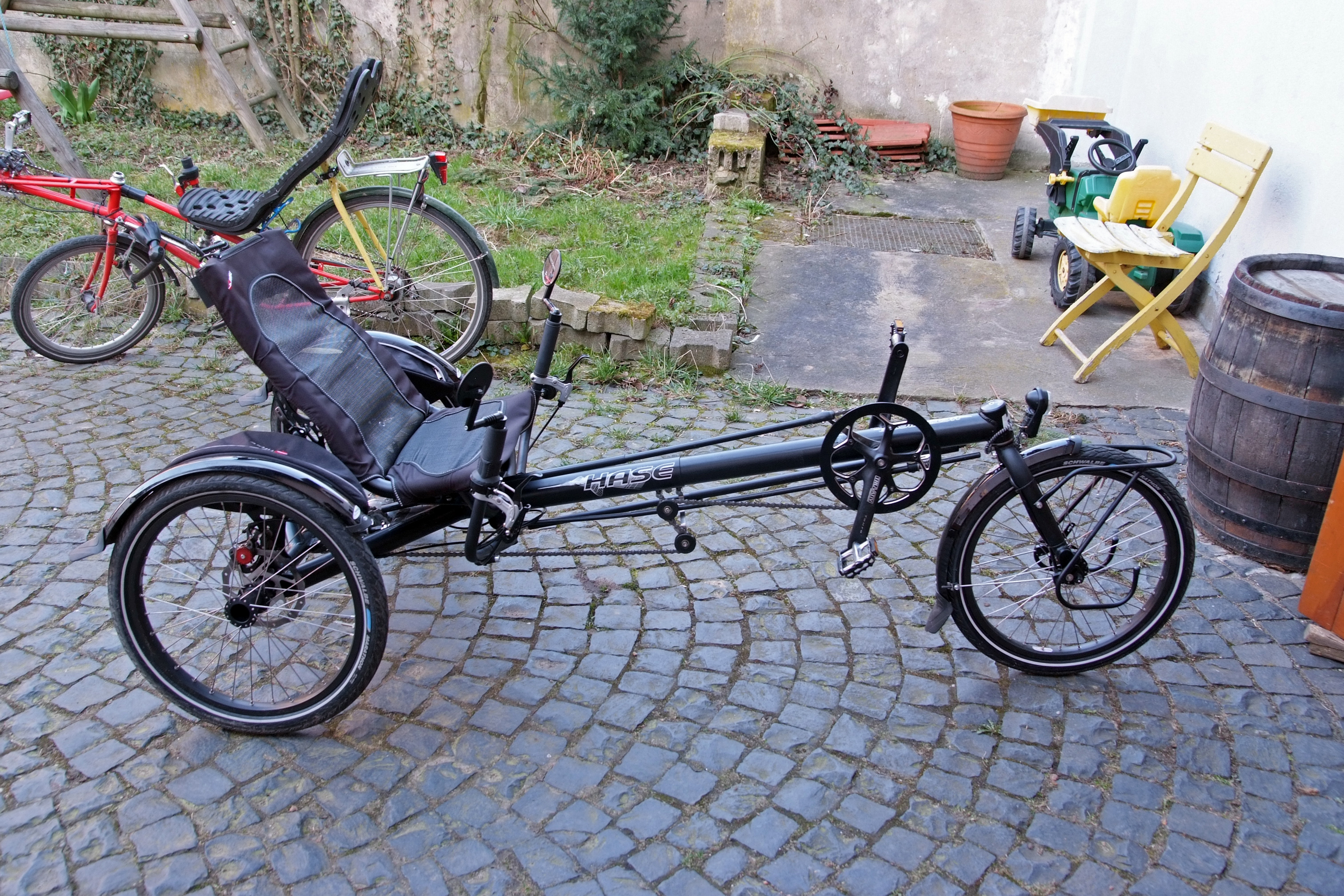
Hase Kettwiesel

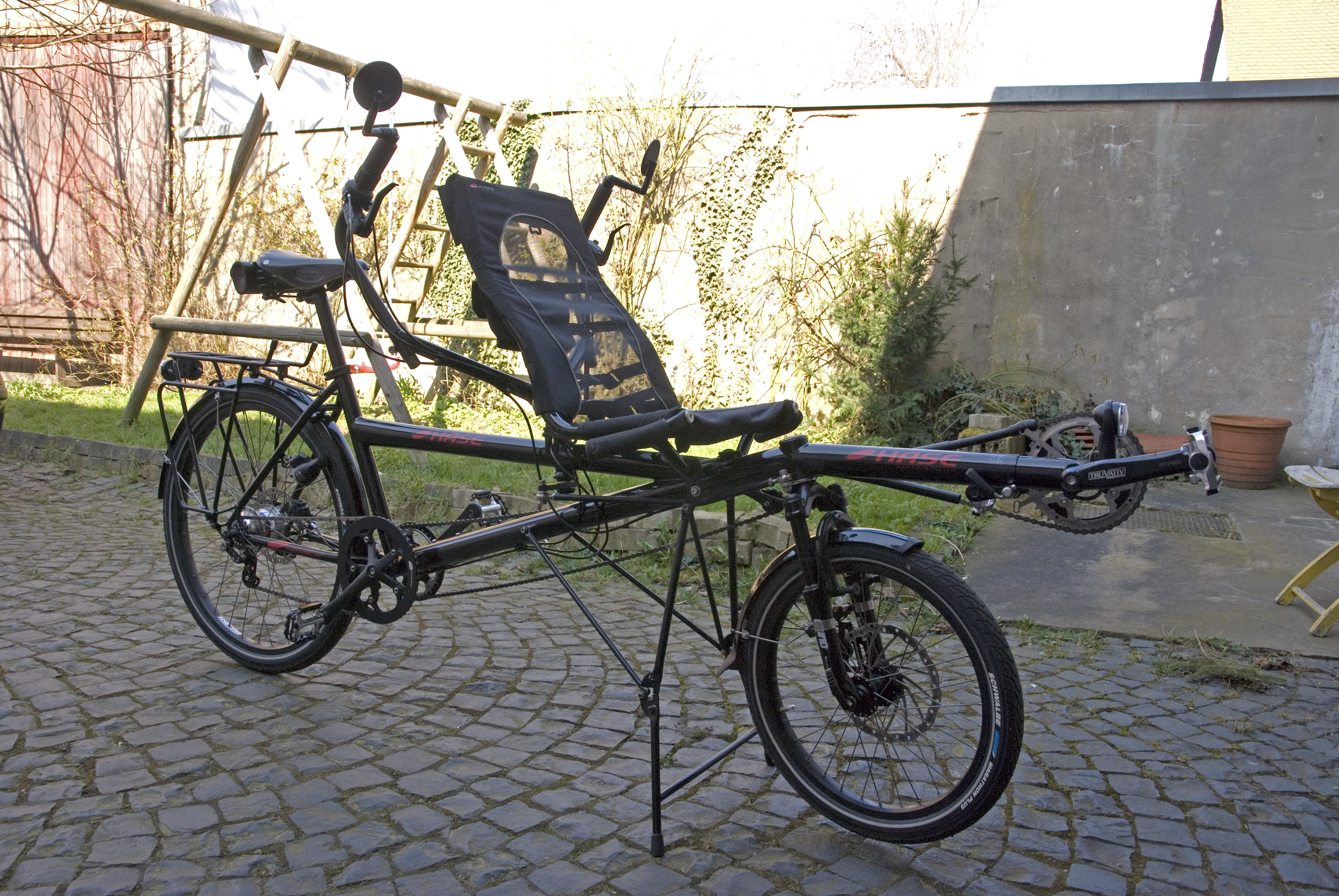
Hase Pino

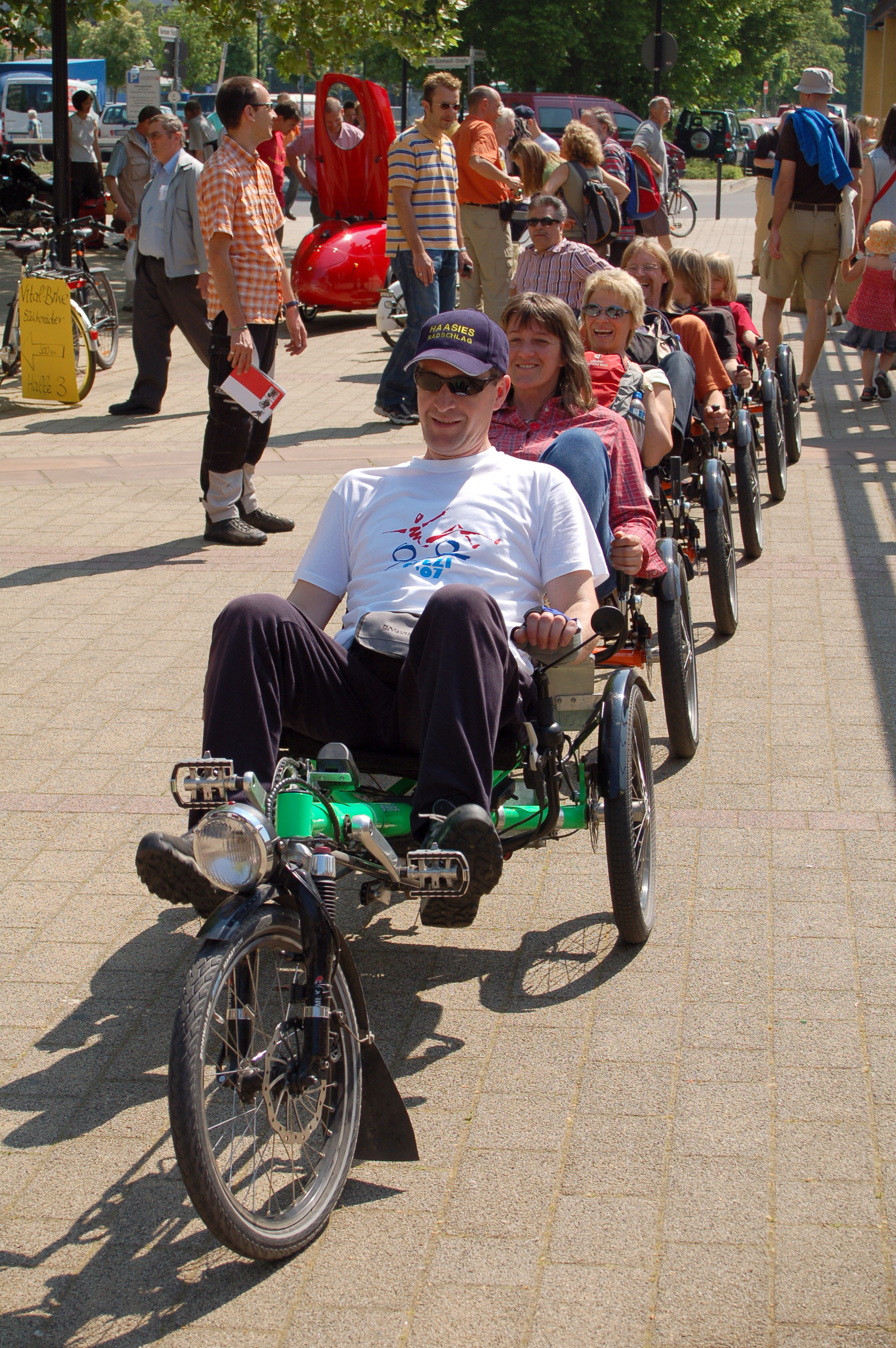
Kettwiesel train

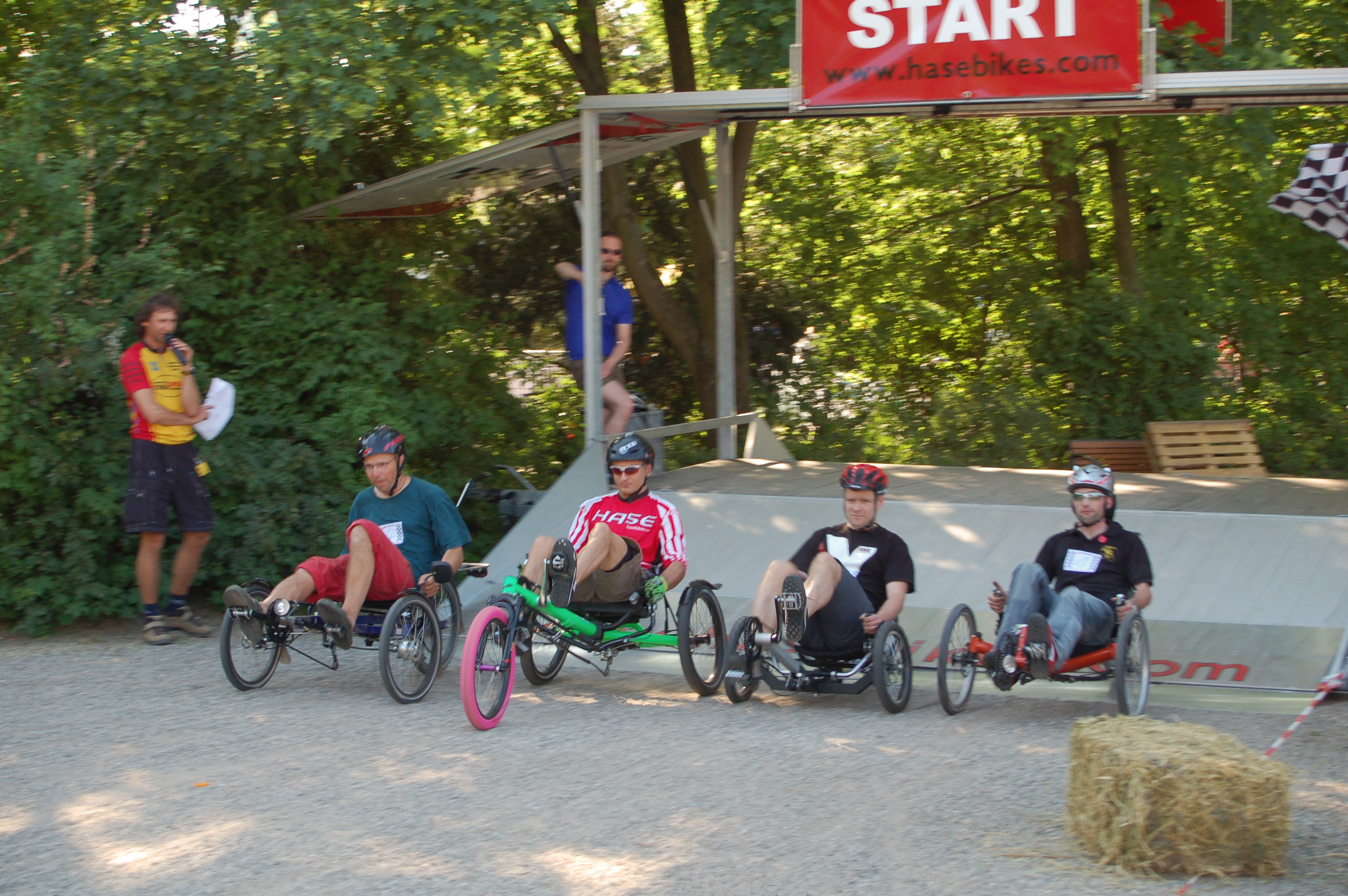
Trike race

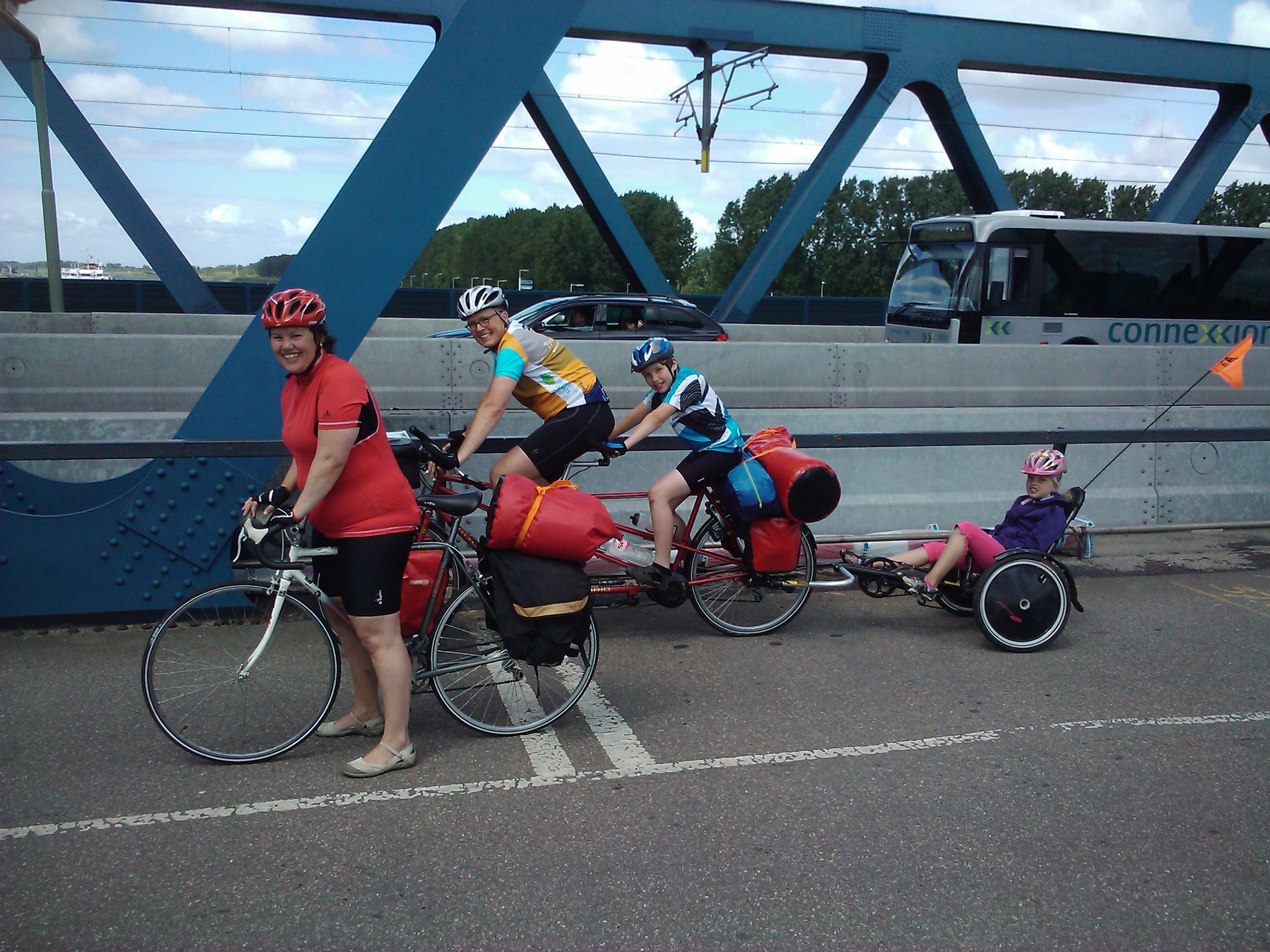
A recumbent two-wheeled Trets trailer bike on the back of a tandem
