= Caloi =

Brazilian manufacturer of bicycles and bicycle equipment

Caloi S.A.
- Type: Private
- Industry: Bicycles
- Founded: 1898; 128 years ago
- Headquarters: São Paulo, Brazil
- Products: Bicycle and Related Components
- Revenue: ▲US$137.8 million (2010)
- Net income: ▲US$18.8 million (2010)
- Number of employees: 1,100
- Parent: Pon Holdings
- Website: www.caloi.com.br

CALOI S.A is a major Brazilian manufacturer of bicycles and bicycle equipment, along with motorized cycles like the past Mobilette models, based in São Paulo. In the 1960s, Caloi achieved some popularity, producing folding bicycles.

== History ==
Caloi was founded in 1898 by Italian immigrant Luigi Caloi and his brother-in-law, Agenor Poletti. The company was directed by the Caloi family from 1898 to 1999. When Luigi Caloi died in 1924, the company changed its name from Casa Luiz Caloi (Portuguese for House of Luiz Caloi) to Casa Irmãos Caloi (Portuguese for House of Caloi Brothers), directed by Luigi's sons Guido, Henrique and José Pedro. In 1928, Henrique and José Pedro left the company, and Caloi was directed by Guido Caloi alone. In 1948, the company changed its name to Indústria e Comércio de Bicicletas Caloi S.A.. Guido died in 1955, and the company was directed by his son Bruno Caloi until 1999. In 1999, the Caloi family sold the majority of Caloi's voting shares to Edson Vaz Musa. Bruno Caloi, who was the president of the CBC (the Brazilian Cycling Confederation) for many years, died in October 2006. In 2013, 70% of Caloi's shares were acquired by Dorel, which also controls other bicycle manufacturers such as Cannondale and Schwinn, among others. Dutch conglomerate Pon Holdings acquired Caloi with the purchase of Dorel Sports in 2021.

=== Manufacturing Plants ===
In 1898 a shop was established in downtown São Paulo, and until 1945 Caloi sold bicycles and parts imported from Europe. In 1945 Caloi established its first factory in the Brooklin pt neighbourhood of São Paulo, as importing parts from Europe became increasingly difficult due to World War II. In 1975, Caloi established a factory in Manaus, taking advantage of the economic incentives of the Free Economic Zone of Manaus. In 1990 Caloi started the operations of its US subsidiary in Jacksonville, Florida. In 2006, Caloi established a new factory in Atibaia, which replaced the São Paulo plant.

== Models ==
Caloi manufactures a wide range of bicycles including mountain bikes, comfort bikes, BMX, road bicycles and child bicycles.

In 1972 the company introduced its first road bike, the Caloi 10. It became a cultural landmark in Brazil and remained in production until 1990. In 2005 the Caloi 10 name was reinstated for a new model that differs significantly from the original, and remains in production as of 2016.

In 1983 the company introduced its first BMX model, the Caloi Cross Extra Light, replicating the style of the bikes that appear in the successful E.T. the Extra-Terrestrial movie.

In 1989 the company introduced its first mountain bike, the Caloi Mountain Bike 18, following the growing popularity of Mountain Bikes in the United States in the early 1980s.
