= On-board =

On-board, on board or onboard may refer to:

- On Board (film), a 1998 Turkish film directed by Serdar Akar
- Onboarding, the mechanism through which new employees acquire the necessary knowledge, skills, and behaviors to become effective organizational members and insiders
- On-board diagnostics
- On-board data handling

== See also ==
- List of ship directions
- Baby on board
