= Baby on Board (disambiguation) =

Baby on Board may refer to:

- Baby on board, a sign intended to be placed on a vehicle to encourage safe driving
- Baby on Board (film), a 2009 film directed by Brian Herzlinger
- "Baby on Board" (Modern Family), an episode of the television series Modern Family
- "Baby on Board" (The Simpsons), a song performed by Homer Simpson's barbershop quartet

== See also ==
- Baby Not on Board, the fourth episode of the seventh season of the TV series Family Guy
