= Dorel Industries =

Canadian furniture and children's products company

Dorel Industries Inc.
- Company type: Public
- Traded as: TSX: DII.B
- Industry: Conglomerate
- Founded: 1962; 64 years ago
- Founders: Leo Schwartz; Martin Schwartz; Alan Schwartz; Jeff Segel
- Headquarters: Montreal, Quebec, Canada
- Key people: Martin Schwartz; Jeffrey Schwartz; Alan Schwartz; Jeff Segel
- Revenue: ▲US$2.603 billion (2017)
- Net income: ▲US$58.3 million (2017)
- Total assets: ▲US$2.172 billion (2017)
- Number of employees: 10,000 (2018)
- Divisions: 2
- Website: www.dorel.com

Dorel Industries Inc. is a Canadian company, based in Montreal, Quebec, which designs and manufactures juvenile products and home furnishings. Its Dorel Sports division, sold in 2022, sold bicycles. It was formed in 1987 as a result of a merger between Dorel Co. Ltd., founded in 1962 by Leo Schwartz and Ridgewood Industries, founded in 1969. Dorel employs approximately 10,000 people and its products are sold in over 100 countries.

== Product segments ==
Dorel divides its brands into the following product segments.

=== Dorel Juvenile ===
Dorel Juvenile is a manufacturer of juvenile products, including car seats, play yards, high chairs, bath accessories, infant health, home safety and feeding products. The company sells more than 8 million children's car seats globally each year.

Juvenile products are designed, manufactured and marketed under several brand names, including Safety 1st, Maxi-Cosi, Quinny and Tiny Love. Regional brands include Cosco, Infanti, Bertini Baby, Bébé Confort, Mother's Choice, and Voyage.

Dorel Juvenile USA is headquartered in Foxborough, Massachusetts, and has a design and development center in Columbus, Indiana. In these locations, the company builds from the concept stage through development. The main US manufacturing facility is also in Columbus, allowing the company to produce many products within the United States. The Dorel Technical Center for Child Safety, also in Columbus, features research and design facilities.

Similar facilities exist in Europe with substantial operations in South America. In 2014 Dorel purchased the juvenile operations of the Lerado Group, providing the company with its first owned facilities in China and Taiwan.

=== Dorel Home ===
Products include home and commercial office furniture in metal or wood, storage cabinets and cubes with storage bins, futons, bunk beds, mattresses, dining tables and upholstered furniture, TV Stands and living room furniture like coffee and end tables, metal folding furniture, step stools, ladders.

The Dorel umbrella for home furnishings includes: The Novogratz, Cosco Home & Office, Ameriwood Industries, Dorel Home Products (DHP) and Dorel Living (formerly Dorel Asia). Dorel Home does significant on-line business.

== Former division ==
=== Dorel Sports ===
In 2004, Dorel acquired Pacific Cycle, a company that designs, markets, and distributes branded bicycles and other recreational products. In February 2008, Dorel purchased the Cannondale Bicycle Corporation and SUGOI Performance Apparel. In July 2009, Dorel announced its acquisition of Iron Horse Bicycles. In August 2013, Dorel announced its acquisition of Brazil-based Bicicletas Caloi S/A.

The Dorel Sports segment comprises three operating divisions:

- The Cycling Sports Group division, which deals specifically with the independent bicycle dealers' channel
- The Pacific Cycle division, which deals with the mass merchant and sporting goods channel
- Caloi: largest bicycle brand in Latin America and leader in Brazil

Dorel markets its sports products under the brand names of Cannondale, Schwinn, GT Bicycles, Mongoose, Caloi, IronHorse, Roadmaster, SUGOI (sold to Garneau June 2018), and Fabric.

In October 2021, Dorel Sports was sold to Dutch Pon Holdings.
