= Gerard Vroomen =

Dutch engineer, businessman (born 1971)

- Born: 20 July 1971 (age 54); Nijmegen
- Occupations: Founder of Open Cycle; Co-founder of Cervélo
- Known for: Designer of Cervelo bicycles

Gérard Vroomen (born 20 July 1971, Nijmegen) is a Dutch-born mechanical engineer and the owner of Open Cycle. He was previously the co-founder of Cervélo & the now-defunct Cervélo TestTeam. He left the operational side of Cervelo in May 2011. Since February 2012, he has been the part-time business development advisor for Cervelo's new owner, the Pon Bicycle Group.

== Cervélo ==
Phil White and Gérard Vroomen founded Cervélo in 1995 when their design for a new time trial bicycle failed to garner interest from traditional bicycle manufacturers. Today, Cervélo is the largest triathlon bike manufacturer in the world and partnered with the triathlon team, Team TBB, and the road cycling team, Garmin–Cervélo.

Readers of VeloNews, CycleSport, Inside Triathlon and Slowtwitch voted Cervélo as the #1 brand they intended to purchase in 2011.

A book titled To Make Riders Faster was released in April 2018 telling the story of Gerard Vroomen and Phil White, co-founders of Cervélo Cycles, meeting at McGill University and taking their company from a school basement project in Montreal, Canada, to their bikes winning in the Tour de France, the Olympics and Ironman.

== Open Cycle ==
Gerard Vroomen (co-founder of Cervélo) and Andy Kessler (Former CEO of BMC), have partnered together in a business called Open. They claim the O-1.0 to be the lightest 29-inch production hardtail on the market.

== 3T ==
In March 2015, three years after selling his stake in Cervélo, Vroomen announced to have teamed up with 3T CEO René Wiertz to acquire all shares in 3T. Under Vroomen and Wiertz, 3T presented their first complete bicycle; the 3T Exploro gravel racer.
