= Open Cycle =

Swiss bicycle company

OPEN Cycle AG
- Type: Private
- Industry: Bicycles
- Founded: 2012
- Founder: Andy Kessler; Gerard Vroomen
- Headquarters: Basel, Switzerland
- Products: Gravel and road bikes
- Website: www.opencycle.com

Open (stylized as OPEN) is a manufacturer of performance gravel bike and road bike frames based in Basel. Founded by Andy Kessler and Gerard Vroomen in January 2012, the company debuted with a single model, the O-1.0. It was claimed to be the lightest 29-inch production hard tail on the market. The Company's current line-up includes two all-road / gravel frames, the OPEN U.P. and OPEN U.P.(P.E.R.), a pure gravel frame OPEN WI:DE, and a classic road bike frame, the OPEN MIN.D.

== Special editions ==
Open have sold frames with paint designs created in collaboration with various other companies.

Collaboration	Frames	Other notes
Assos	40	
Yeti Cycles	50+ (2nd run of unknown number)	
DT Swiss	30	
Rapha		Only sold to Rapha Cycle Club members
ENVE	50	Sold as a set with various Enve components. All frames were misnumbered 3/30
Omata	20	Sold as a set with the Omata One cycling computer
SRAM AXS	40	Only sold as a complete bike
René Herse	U.P.P.E.R.	Announced. October 28, 2022. Pre-orders until 2024-07-28
Camille McMillan		OPEN E.A.R.
