= Rainer-Wurz.com =

Rainer-Wurz.com was an international mountain bike team owned and run by former MTB rider Markus Rainer and former Formula One driver Alexander Wurz.

The team was formed in 1995 as Rainer Bike Team by Markus after he retired from top-line riding after a severe accident at the United States World Cup round of 1990. In 2000 Markus joined forces with then-Benetton Formula driver and fellow Austrian Wurz. After two successful years, the team were joined in 2003 by bike manufacturer Cannondale and mobile phone corporation Siemens as sponsors, becoming the Siemens Cannondale MTB team.

Riders included Cedric Gracia (downhill) and Christoph Sauser (cross-country).
