= Cervélo =

Canadian bicycle manufacturer

Cervélo Cycles Inc.
- Company type: Subsidiary
- Industry: Bicycles
- Founded: 1995; 31 years ago in Toronto, Canada
- Founder: Gerard Vroomen; Phil White
- Headquarters: Aliso Viejo, California, U.S.
- Area served: Worldwide
- Products: Bicycles and related components
- Revenue: CAN$11,100,000 (est.) (2004)
- Parent: Pon Holdings
- Website: www.cervelo.com

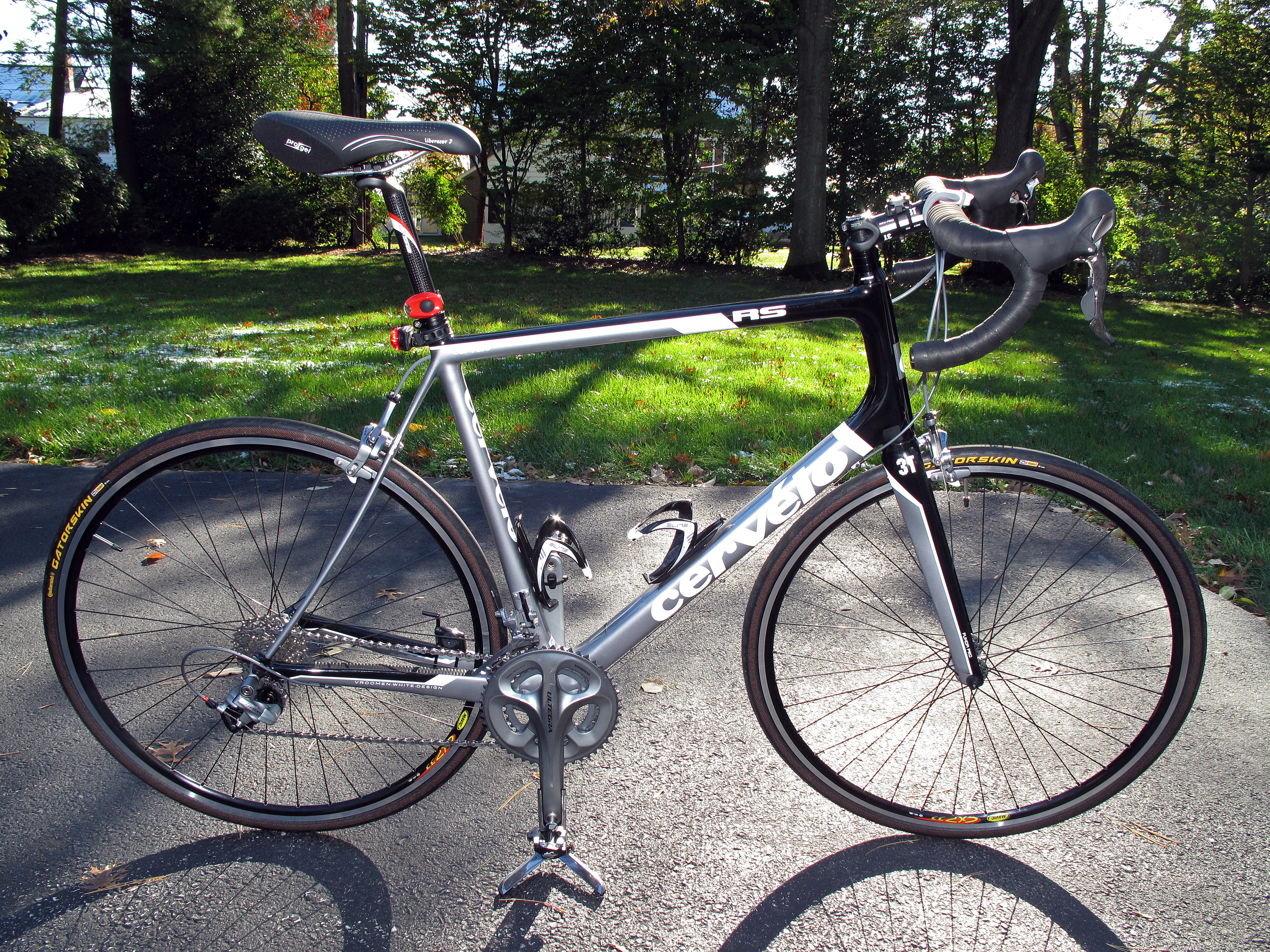
2010 Cervélo RS road bike

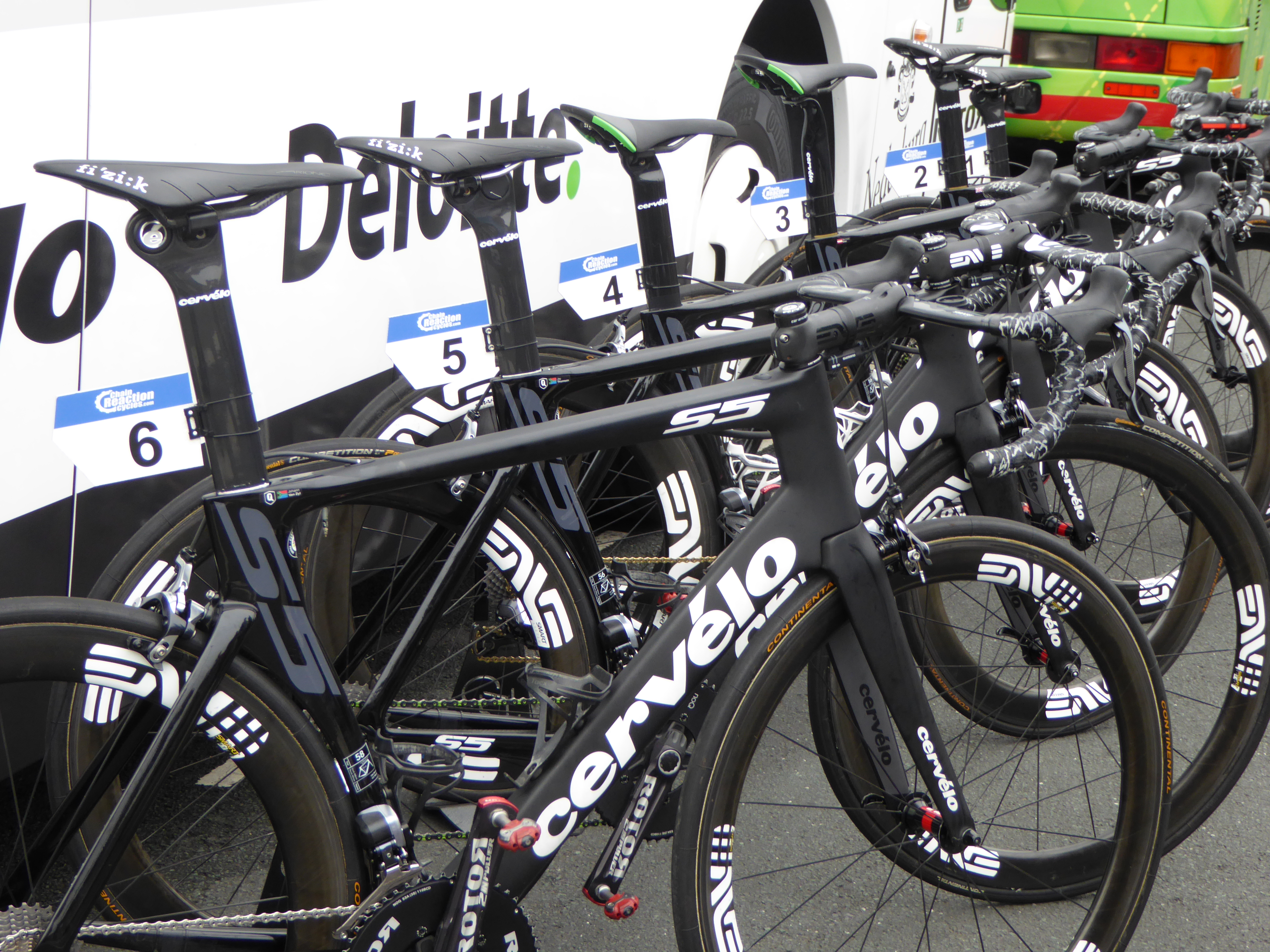
Cervélo bicycles, used by the Team Dimension Data cycling team, at the 2016 Tour of Britain.

Cervélo Cycles Inc. is a manufacturer of racing and track bicycles. Cervélo uses CAD, computational fluid dynamics, and wind tunnel testing at a variety of facilities including the San Diego Air and Space Technology Center, in California, US, to aid its designs. Frame materials include carbon fibre. Cervélo currently makes 5 series of bikes: the C series and R series of road bikes, the latter featuring multi-shaped, "Squoval" frame tubes; the S series of road bikes and P series of triathlon/time trial bikes, both of which feature airfoil shaped down tubes; and the T series of track bikes. Additionally, the company manufactures the Caledonia, Soloist, and Aspero models. In professional competition, cyclists have ridden Cervélo bicycles to victory in all three of road cycling's grand tours: the Tour de France; the Giro d'Italia; and the Vuelta a España. In 2023, Cervélo achieved a historic sweep of all three grand tours in a single year.

== History ==
Gerard Vroomen, one of the two founders of the company, started researching bike dynamics at the Eindhoven University of Technology. He took his knowledge to Canada to continue the research in McGill University under the supervision of Prof. Larry Lessard. In 1995, Vroomen and Phil White founded Cervélo Cycles. The name Cervélo is a portmanteau of cervello, the Italian word for brain, and vélo, the French word for bike.

In May 2011, Vroomen sold his stake in Cervélo to pursue new projects, although he is nominally still involved with the company at the board level. Cervélo is now owned by Pon Holdings, a Dutch company that also owns Gazelle, and Derby Cycle. The company makes or has marketing rights to bicycles from Raleigh, Kalkhoff, Univega, Focus Bikes, Ghost, and Santa Cruz Bicycles.

A book titled, To Make Riders Faster, by Anna Dopico, was released in April 2018. The book tells the story of Gerard Vroomen and Phil White meeting at McGill University and taking their company from a school basement project in Montreal, Canada, to their bikes winning in the Tour de France, the Olympics and Ironman.

== Professional sport ==
Cervélo's sponsorship of elite athletes has led to widespread recognition of the brand.

In 2003, Cervélo became the bike supplier to Team CSC, at the time the 14th team on the world ranking. Aside possibly from LeMond Bicycles and their collaborations with Merlin Metalworks and Calfee Design, Cervélo may have been the smallest and youngest bike company to ever supply a team at this level. Team CSC was crowned the world's #1 pro cycling team aboard Cervélo for three years. The partnership lasted for six years, until the end of 2008.

In 2009, Cervélo became the first bike manufacturer in the modern era to have its own cycling team at the highest levels of racing, Cervélo TestTeam. The team had a stated goal of not only competing successfully on the international level, but also encouraging collaboration between the team members, Cervélo, and other product sponsorship partners in order to develop better products. There was also a strong focus on fan interaction and experiences. The team's most renowned riders were 2008 Tour de France winner Carlos Sastre and 2010 World Champion and 2009 TdF Green Jersey winner Thor Hushovd. Heinrich Haussler also took many of the team's headlines, with his impressive performances at Paris–Nice, Milan–San Remo, and his stage win in the 2009 Tour de France (Stage 13, Colmar).

In 2010, Emma Pooley and Thor Hushovd won the UCI Women's Timetrial and UCI Men's Road Race respectively. Success was also achieved in a number of ITU Triathlon Races and the Ironman 70.3 and long-distance events.

For the 2011 season, Cervélo joined forces with Slipstream sports to form the Garmin–Cervélo team, which also included a women's team. This partnership lasted until the end of the 2014 season.

For the 2015, 2016, 2017 and 2018 season, they provided bikes to MTN-Qhubeka that turned into Team Dimension-Data for Qhubeka in 2016.

For the 2021 season, Cervélo began a partnership with Team Jumbo–Visma, supplying bicycles that were ridden to victory in the 2021 and 2023 Vuelta a España, the 2022 and 2023 Tour de France, as well as the 2023 Giro d'Italia, while also adding a gold medal at the 2020 Summer Olympics and a rainbow jersey at the 2022 UCI Road World Championships. Additional they won the 2022 and 2023 Omloop Het Nieuwsblad, 2022 Paris–Nice, 2023 Tirreno–Adriatico, 2023 Volta a Catalunya, 2023 E3 Saxo Bank Classic, 2023 Dwars door Vlaanderen, 2021 and 2023 Tour of the Basque Country, 2021 Amstel Gold Race, 2022 and 2023 Critérium du Dauphiné,

== International racing success ==
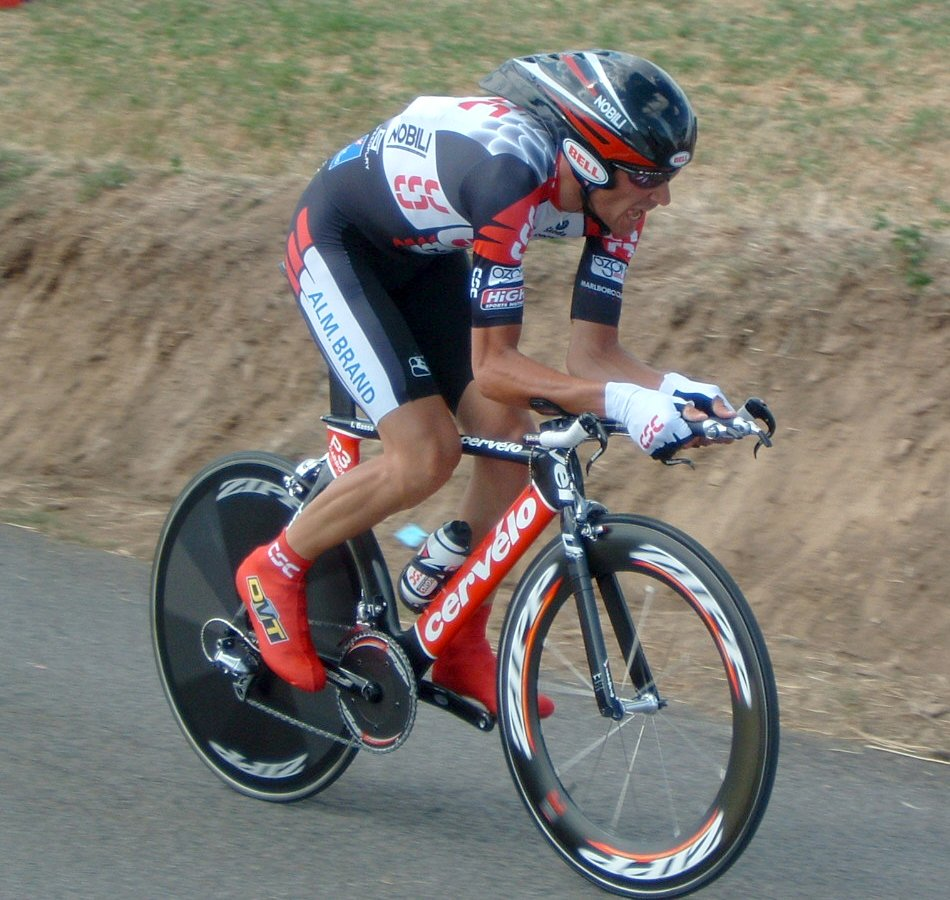
Italian cyclist Ivan Basso of CSC riding his Cervélo P3C time-trial bicycle during stage 20 (ITT) of the 2005 Tour de France.

In 2006 Team CSC rider Fabian Cancellara won Paris–Roubaix on a Cervelo R3. In 2007 Team CSC rider Stuart O'Grady won Paris–Roubaix on a Cervelo R3.

On 13 October 2007 triathlete Chrissie Wellington of the UK won the Ford Ironman world championship in Kailua-Kona, HI. Her bike in the 180 km ride was the Cervélo P2C with which she posted the quickest split time [for pro women] of 5:06:15; four minutes faster than her nearest opponent.

On 27 July 2008, Carlos Sastre of Spain won the Tour de France on Soloist SLC-SL and R3-SL Cervélo framesets. It was Cervélo's first Tour win.

From 2003 to 2008, Cervélo enjoyed the partnership with team CSC/Saxobank with whom they achieved a number of wins on the professional racing circuit. Wins from Fabian Cancellara in the UCI World Timetrial championships, Olympic road and timetrial podium finishes for both Fabian Cancellara and tradeteam teammate Gustav Erik Larsson. In addition to these high-profile victories, Cervélo bikes were also ridden to overall success in the Tour de France team classification and ProTour team classifications.

Cervélo are one of the few manufacturers who have produced an aluminium frame that achieved success against carbon fibre road bicycles, with the Soloist. The Cervelo Soloist Team from the 2003–2005 UCI ProTour season was ridden to success by Team CSC in some of the historical cycling races held in Europe, such as the Critérium International and the Paris–Nice stage race. The Soloist Carbon from the 2006–2007 UCI ProTour season was ridden to success in the Giro d'Italia.

Cervélo are the only manufacturer to produce an aero-road frame (Soloist) that has won on the cobbled road race classics, with additional wins from the S-series bicycles notably in the 2009 Omloop Het Nieuwsblad and 2010 Tour de France (Stage 3) by Thor Hushovd.

In 2011, Garmin–Cervélo rode the updated (BBright bottom bracket and tapered head tube) R3 frame in the cobbled classics, with Johan Van Summeren winning Paris–Roubaix.

Today, Cervélo is the world's largest manufacturer of time trial and triathlon bikes, as determined in industry counts including decisive wins for the past fifteen years at the prestigious Kona bike count. The winner of the 2008 Tour de France, Carlos Sastre, did so on a Cervélo. At the Beijing Olympics Cervélo bikes were ridden by over forty Olympic athletes, resulting in three Gold, five Silver and two Bronze medals – a record. In 2011, the Cervélo S3 received numerous awards from cycling publications including being selected as Editors' Pick in VeloNews' Aero Road Bike Test and Best Race Bike in the Bicycling Magazine Editors' Choice Awards.

== Models ==
=== Soloist ===
The Cervélo Soloist is the brand's all-round road bike. Representing a balance in aerodynamics, weight, and price.

=== R-Series ===
The Cervélo R-Series is the brand's climbing road bike. The R5 is the lightest of the brand's road offerings.

=== S-Series ===
The Cervélo S-Series is the brand's aerodynamic road bike. The S5 is the most aerodynamic of the brand's road offerings.

=== P-Series ===
The Cervélo P-Series is the brand's time trial and triathlon bike series.

=== T-Series ===
The Cervélo T-Series is the brand's track bike.

Road				Time trial / Triathlon	Track	Gravel	Cyclocross	Mountain	E-Bike
Soloist	R-Series	S-Series	C-Series	P-Series	T-Series	Áspero	CX	Z-Series	Rouvida
Soloist (Note: No longer made.); Soloist Carbon; Soloist Team	RS; R2; R3 / R3d; R5/R5D; RCA	S1; S2; S3 / S3d; S5	C2; C3; C5	P1; P2; P3; P3X; P4; P5-three (Note: UCI compliant variant); P5-six (Note: Triathlon variant); P5X	T1; T3; T4; T5GB	Áspero Áspero-5	R5-CX	ZHT-5 ZFS-5	Rouvida

== Awards, sponsorship and victories ==
=== Awards ===
2016
Gran Fondo Design & Innovation Award: Cervélo S5 DA DI2

2018
Red Dot Design Award: Cervélo P5X
220 Triathlon: Bike Brand of the Year
VeloNews Gear Awards 2018 | For the speed demon: Cervélo S5

=== Sponsorship ===
Team CSC (2003–2008)
CSC–Saxo Bank (2008)
Cervélo TestTeam (2009–2010)
Team Garmin−Cervélo (2011)
Team Garmin−Barracuda (2012)
Garmin−Sharp (2012–2014)
MTN–Qhubeka (2015)
Team Dimension Data for Qhubeka (2016–2018)
Team Sunweb (2019–2020)
Team Jumbo–Visma (2021-2023)
Visma-Lease a Bike (2024-current)

=== Significant victories ===
This is an incomplete list, you can help by expanding it...

2003
Tour de France

1st Team CSC, Team classification
Stages 10, 13 & 16

Liège–Bastogne–Liège

1st Tyler Hamilton, General classification

National road cycling championships

1st Nicki Sørensen, Denmark Men's National Road Race Champion
1st Michael Blaudzun, Denmark Men's National Time Trial Champion

2004
Tour de France

Stage 12

Paris–Nice

1st Jörg Jaksche, General classification

Critérium International

1st Jens Voigt, General classification
Stage 1

Tour Méditerranéen

1st Jörg Jaksche

National road cycling championships

1st Michael Blaudzun, Denmark Men's National Road Race Champion
1st Michael Sandstød, Denmark Men's National Time Trial Champion

2005
Giro d'Italia

Stages 17 & 18

Vuelta a España

Stage 18

Paris–Nice

1st Bobby Julich, General classification
1st Jens Voigt, Points classification
1st Team CSC, Best team
Stage Prologue

Critérium International

1st Bobby Julich, General classification

Tour of Qatar

1st Lars Michaelsen, General classification

Tour Méditerranéen

1st Jens Voigt

National road cycling championships

1st Lars Bak, Denmark Men's Elite Road Race Champion
1st Michael Blaudzun, Denmark Men's Elite Time Trial Champion
1st Fränk Schleck, Luxembourg Men's Elite Road Race Champion
1st Andy Schleck, Luxembourg Men's Elite Time Trial Champion

2006
Tour de France

Stages 13, 15 & 17

Giro d'Italia

1st Ivan Basso, General classification
Stages 5, 8, 16 & 20

Vuelta a España

Stage 1

UCI Road World Championships

1st Fabian Cancellara, Men's time trial

Paris–Roubaix

1st Fabian Cancellara

Critérium International

1st Ivan Basso, General classification

Tour of Britain

1st Martin Pedersen

Deutschland Tour

1st Jens Voigt, Gelbes Trikot (General classification)
Stages 2, 6 & 7

National road cycling championships

1st Peter Luttenberger, Austria Men's Elite Time Trial Champion
1st Brian Vandborg, Denmark Men's Elite Time Trial Champion
1st Kurt Asle Arvesen, Norway Men's Elite Time Trial Champion
1st Fabian Cancellara, Switzerland Men's Elite Time Trial Champion
1st David Zabriskie, United States Men's Elite Time Trial Champion

2007
Tour de France

Stages Prologue & 3

UCI Road World Championships
Giro d'Italia

Stage 8
1st Fabian Cancellara, Men's time trial

Paris–Roubaix

1st Stuart O'Grady

Critérium International

1st Jens Voigt, General classification

Deutschland Tour

1st Jens Voigt, Gelbes Trikot (General classification)

National road cycling championships

1st Fabian Cancellara, Switzerland Men's Elite Time Trial Champion

2008
Tour de France

1st Carlos Sastre, General classification
1st Carlos Sastre, Mountains classification
1st Andy Schleck, Young rider classification
1st CSC–Saxo Bank, Team classification
Stages 11, 17 & 20

Summer Olympic Games

1st Fabian Cancellara, Men's time trial
1st Joan Llaneras, Men's points race
2nd Roger Kluge, Men's points race
2nd Fabian Cancellara, Men's road race
2nd Simon Whitfield, Men's triathlon
2nd Spain (Joan Llaneras & Antonio Tauler), Men's Madison
1st Kristin Armstrong, Women's time trial
3rd Karin Thürig, Women's time trial

Tour of Britain

1st Matthew Goss, Points classification

2009
Tour de France

1st Thor Hushovd, Points classification
Stages 6 & 13

Giro d'Italia

Stages 14, 16, 19 & 21

Tour of Qatar

1st Heinrich Haussler, Points classification
1st Heinrich Haussler, Youth classification

2010
Tour de France

Stage 3

UCI Road World Championships

1st Thor Hushovd, Men's road race

Tour of Qatar

1st Heinrich Haussler, Points classification
1st Cervélo TestTeam, Team classification

2011
Tour de France

1st Garmin–Cervélo, Team classification
Stages 2, 3, 13 & 16

Giro d'Italia

Stage 21

Vuelta a España

Stage 9

Paris–Roubaix

1st Johan Vansummeren

Tour of Qatar

1st Heinrich Haussler, Points classification
1st Garmin–Cervélo, Team classification

Tour Down Under

1st Cameron Meyer, General classification
1st Cameron Meyer, Young rider classification
Stage 4

2012
Tour de France

Stage 12

Giro d'Italia

1st Ryder Hesjedal, General classification
1st Trofeo Super Team (Team points classification), Team Garmin−Barracuda
Stage 4

Summer Olympic Games

2nd Lizzie Armitstead, Women's road race

Tour of Britain

1st Nathan Haas, General classification

Tour of Qatar

1st Ramūnas Navardauskas, Young rider classification

National road cycling championships

1st Fabian Wegmann, Germany Men's Elite Road Race Champion
1st Robert Hunter, South Africa Men's Elite Road Race Champion
1st Ramūnas Navardauskas, Lithuania Men's Elite Time Trial Champion
1st David Zabriskie, United States Men's Elite Time Trial Champion

2013
Tour de France

Stage 9

Giro d'Italia

Stage 11

Volta a Catalunya

1st Dan Martin, General classification
1st Garmin–Sharp, Team classification
Stage 4

Liège–Bastogne–Liège

1st Dan Martin

2013 Paris–Nice

Stage 3

Critérium du Dauphiné

1st Rohan Dennis, Young rider classification

2014
Tour de France

Stage 19

Vuelta a España

Stage 14

Critérium du Dauphiné

1st Andrew Talansky, General classification

Tour of Britain

1st Dylan van Baarle, General classification

2014 Paris–Nice

Stages 4 & 7

Giro di Lombardia

1st Dan Martin

National road cycling championships

1st Sebastian Langeveld, Netherlands Men's Elite Road Race Champion
1st Ramūnas Navardauskas, Lithuania Men's Elite Time Trial Champion
1st Steele Von Hoff, Australia National Criterium Champion

2015
Tour de France

Stage 14

Vuelta a España

Stage 10

Critérium du Dauphiné

1st Daniel Teklehaimanot, Mountains classification

Tour of Britain

1st Edvald Boasson Hagen, General classification

National road cycling championships

1st Natnael Berhane, Eritrea Men's Elite Road Race Champion
1st Edvald Boasson Hagen, Norway Men's Elite Road Race Champion
1st Jacques Janse van Rensburg, South Africa Men's Elite Road Race Champion
1st Daniel Teklehaimanot, Eritrea Men's Elite Time Trial Champion
1st Edvald Boasson Hagen, Norway Men's Elite Time Trial Champion

2016
Tour de France

Stages 1, 3, 6 & 14

Vuelta a España

1st Omar Fraile, Mountains classification

Summer Olympic Games

1st Great Britain (Ed Clancy, Steven Burke, Owain Doull & Bradley Wiggins), Men's team pursuit
1st Great Britain (Philip Hindes, Jason Kenny & Callum Skinner), Men's team sprint
1st Jason Kenny, Men's keirin
1st Jason Kenny, Men's sprint
2nd Callum Skinner, Men's sprint
2nd Mark Cavendish, Men's omnium
1st Great Britain (Katie Archibald, Laura Trott, Elinor Barker & Joanna Rowsell Shand), Women's team pursuit
1st Laura Trott, Women's omnium
2nd Becky James, Women's keirin
2nd Becky James, Women's sprint
3rd Katy Marchant, Women's sprint

Critérium du Dauphiné

1st Edvald Boasson Hagen, Points classification
1st Daniel Teklehaimanot, Mountains classification
Stages 4 & 7

Tour of Britain

1st Steve Cummings, General classification

Tour of Qatar

1st Mark Cavendish, General classification
Stages 1 & 3

Track Cycling World Championships

1st Bradley Wiggins, Men's madison

National road cycling championships

1st Kanstantsin Sivtsov, Belarus Men's Elite Road Race Champion
1st Daniel Teklehaimanot, Eritrea Men's Elite Road Race Champion
1st Edvald Boasson Hagen, Norway Men's Elite Road Race Champion
1st Jaco Venter, South Africa Men's Elite Road Race Champion
1st Kanstantsin Sivtsov, Belarus Men's Elite Time Trial Champion
1st Daniel Teklehaimanot, Eritrea Men's Elite Time Trial Champion
1st Edvald Boasson Hagen, Norway Men's Elite Time Trial Champion
1st Adrien Niyonshuti, Rwanda Men's Elite Time Trial Champion

2017
Tour de France

Stage 19

Giro d'Italia

Stage 11

National road cycling championships

1st Youcef Reguigui, Algeria Men's Elite Road Race Champion
1st Steve Cummings, Great Britain Men's Elite Road Race Champion
1st Reinardt Janse van Rensburg, South Africa Men's Elite Road Race Champion
1st Steve Cummings, Great Britain Men's Elite Time Trial Champion
1st Mekseb Debesay, Eritrea Men's Elite Time Trial Champion
1st Edvald Boasson Hagen, Norway Men's Elite Time Trial Champion
1st Adrien Niyonshuti, Rwanda Men's Elite Time Trial Champion

2018
Vuelta a España

Stages 4 & 9

Tour of Britain

1st Nicholas Dlamini, Mountains classification

National road cycling championships

1st Merhawi Kudus, Eritrea Men's Elite Road Race Champion
1st Edvald Boasson Hagen, Norway Men's Elite Time Trial Champion

2019
Giro d'Italia

Stage 21

Vuelta a España

Stage 8

Deutschland Tour

1st Marc Hirschi, Young rider classification

2020
Tour de France

Marc Hirschi, Combativity award
Stages 12, 14 & 19

Giro d'Italia

Stage 18

National road cycling championships

1st Juliette Labous, France Women's Elite Time Trial Champion

Paris–Nice

1st Tiesj Benoot, Points classification
1st Team Sunweb, Team classification
Stages 4 & 6

Herald Sun Tour

1st Jai Hindley, General classification
1st Jai Hindley, Mountains classification
1st Team Sunweb, Team classification
Stages 1, 2 & 4

La Flèche Wallonne

1st Marc Hirschi

Bretagne Classic Ouest–France

1st Michael Matthews

2021
Tour de France

Stages 11, 15, 20 & 21

Vuelta a España

1st Primož Roglič, General classification
Stages 1, 11, 17 & 21

Summer Olympic Games

1st Primož Roglič, Men's time trial
2nd Tom Dumoulin, Men's time trial
2nd Wout van Aert, Men's road race

Paris–Nice

1st Primož Roglič, Points classification
Stages 4, 6 & 7

Tour of the Basque Country

1st Primož Roglič, General classification
1st Primož Roglič, Points classification
1st Primož Roglič, Mountains classification
1st Jonas Vingegaard, Young rider classification
1st Team Jumbo–Visma, Team classification
Stage 1

Tour of Britain

1st Wout van Aert, General classification
Stages 1, 4, 6 & 8

National road cycling championships

1st Wout van Aert, Belgium Men's Elite Road Race Champion
1st Timo Roosen, Netherlands Men's Elite Road Race Champion
1st George Bennett, New Zealand Men's Elite Road Race Champion
1st Tobias Foss, Norway Men's Elite Road Race Champion
1st Tony Martin, Germany Men's Elite Time Trial Champion
1st Tom Dumoulin, Netherlands Men's Elite Time Trial Champion
1st Tobias Foss, Norway Men's Elite Time Trial Champion

2022
Tour de France

1st Jonas Vingegaard, General classification
1st Wout van Aert, Points classification
1st Jonas Vingegaard, Mountains classification
1st Wout van Aert, Combativity award
Stages 4, 8, 11, 18 & 20

Vuelta a España

Stages 1 & 4

Giro d'Italia

1st Koen Bouwman, Mountains classification
Stages 7 & 19

UCI Road World Championships

1st Tobias Foss, Men's time trial

National road cycling championships

1st Pascal Eenkhoorn, Netherlands Men's Elite Road Race Champion
1st Tobias Foss, Norway Men's Elite Time Trial Champion
1st Rohan Dennis, Australia Men's Elite Time Trial Champion
1st Riejanne Markus, Netherlands Women's Elite Road Race Champion

2023
Tour de France

1st Jonas Vingegaard, General classification
1st Team Jumbo–Visma, Team classification
Stages 16 & 20

Giro d'Italia

1st Primož Roglič, General classification
Stage 20

Vuelta a España

1st Sepp Kuss, General classification
1st Team Jumbo–Visma, Team classification
Stages 6, 8, 13, 16 & 17

National road cycling championships

1st Dylan van Baarle, Netherlands Men's Elite Road Race Champion
1st Attila Valter, Hungary Men's Elite Road Race Champion
1st Wout van Aert, Belgium Men's Elite Time Trial Champion
1st Jos van Emden, Netherlands Men's Elite Time Trial Champion
1st Attila Valter, Hungary Men's Elite Time Trial Champion
1st Riejanne Markus, Netherlands Women's Elite Time Trial Champion

== See also ==
- Cervélo TestTeam
- Team Jumbo–Visma
