= Caloi 10 =

Model of race bicycles

Caloi 10 was a model of race bicycles made by Brazilian manufacturer Caloi between 1972 and 1990. It was the first multispeed bicycle manufactured in Brazil, and became a cultural landmark of the 1970s and 1980s. The Caloi 10 featured 27" aluminum rims, 10-speed drivetrain, 52/46-teeth Chainrings, and steel frame. In 1990 the Caloi 10 was replaced by the Caloi 12. In 2005, Caloi introduced a new low-budget bike model called Caloi 10, featuring 12-speed drivetrain and an aluminum frame with sloping geometry.
