= Gazelle (bicycle company) =

Bicycle manufacturing company from the Netherlands

Royal Dutch Gazelle

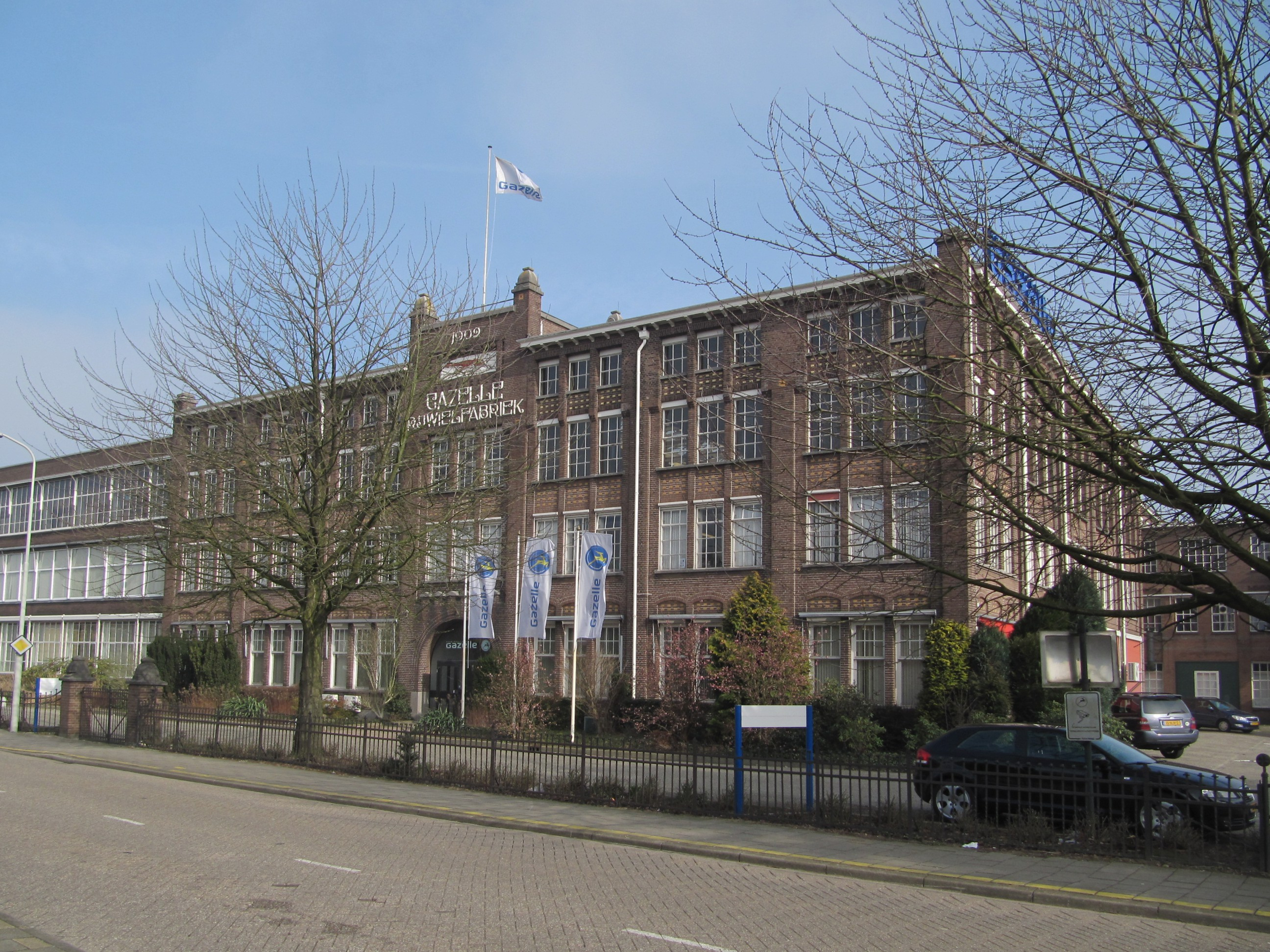
- Gazelle bicycle factory in Dieren
- Type: Private
- Industry: Bicycles
- Founded: 1892; 134 years ago
- Headquarters: Dieren, Netherlands
- Products: Bicycles and Accessories
- Number of employees: 550
- Website: www.gazelle.nl

Royal Dutch Gazelle is the largest and most famous bicycle manufacturer in the Netherlands. The company employs 550 workers at its factory in Dieren, Netherlands, producing 300,000 bicycles a year. Total production has passed 13 million.

== History ==
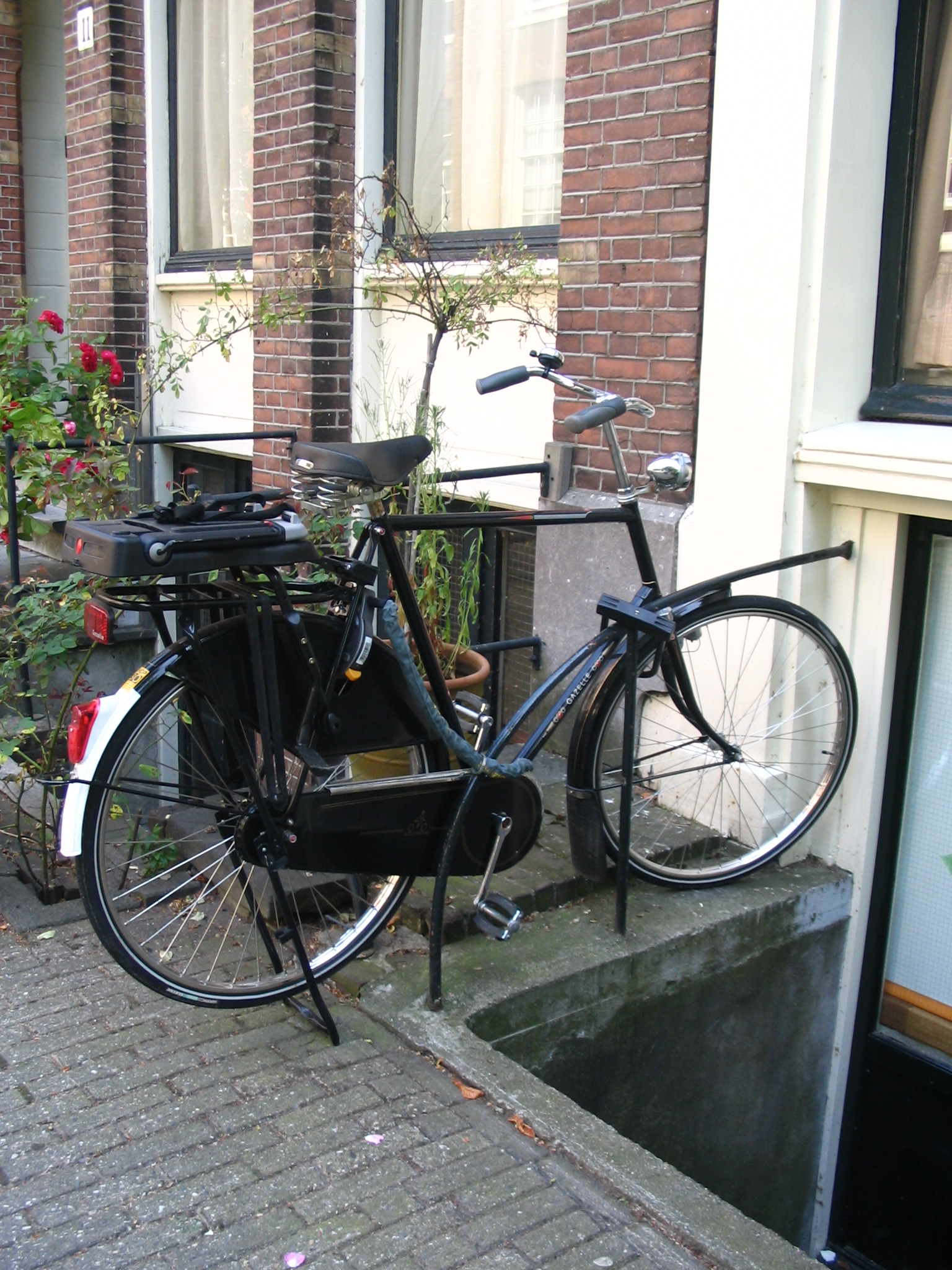
Classic contemporary gents's model

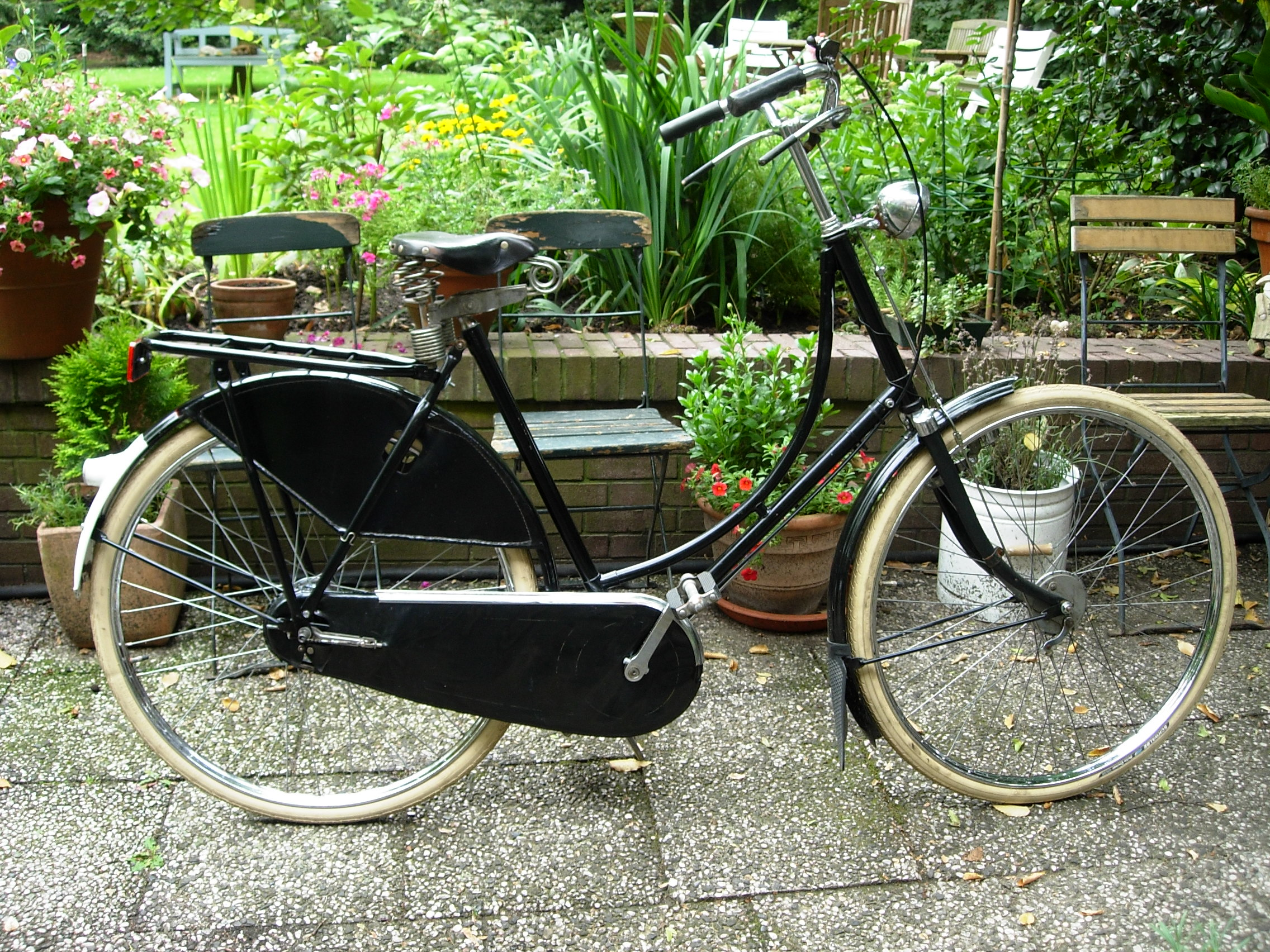
A vintage 1954 Ladies Gazelle

=== 19th century ===
The company was founded 1892 by Willem Kölling and Rudolf Arentsen. Initially it sold bicycles imported from England.

=== 20th century ===
Gazelle started their own production using the Gazelle name in 1902. During the period from the 1920s to the 1940s, Gazelle had success exporting bicycles to the East Indies. Many Gazelle bicycles survive throughout Indonesia even today and are a highly sought-after Dutch collector's item. During this period, Gazelle used the Piet Pelle cartoon character throughout many advertising campaigns. This video from 1925 shows the Gazelle factory and production techniques.

Developments include a collapsible delivery bicycle in 1930, and a tandem bicycle introduced in 1935. An electric bicycle was produced in 1937 together with Philips.

In 1954 Gazelle became a public company and built its millionth bicycle. In 1959, Gazelle patented the first 3-speed grip shift gear system.

Gazelle was the first Dutch bicycle manufacturer to introduce the "Kwikstep" folding bicycle in 1964. The front-hub drum brake was developed in 1968 and is still in production today.

In the mid-1960s, Gazelle built a "Special Racing Division" workshop at their factory in Dieren. In this workshop, race frames were handbuilt by skilled craftsmen. At the height of their commercial success (around 1980–1985) about 35 people were employed. Gazelle had success with the steel framed "Champion Mondial" bicycles and sponsored the now infamous TVMracing team. The team folded in 2000 because of a doping scandal.

The centenary in 1992 coincided with the eighth millionth bicycle produced. Princess Margriet classified the company "Royal" Gazelle in honor of the anniversary. From then on one million bicycles were produced every three to four years.

=== 21st century ===
In 2009, Gazelle won the Dutch Bike of the Year with the Chamonix Innergy electric bike. This was the first time in the competition's history that an electric bike had won the prestigious award.

In 2010, Gazelle was voted the most trusted bicycle brand in the Reader's Digest annual brand survey in Europe.

In 2011 Gazelle was acquired by Pon Holdings, co-owner of Cervélo bikes, and importer of Volkswagen in the Netherlands.

== See also ==
- Willem II–Gazelle
- Utility cycling
- Dutch bicycle
