= Dieren =

- Town
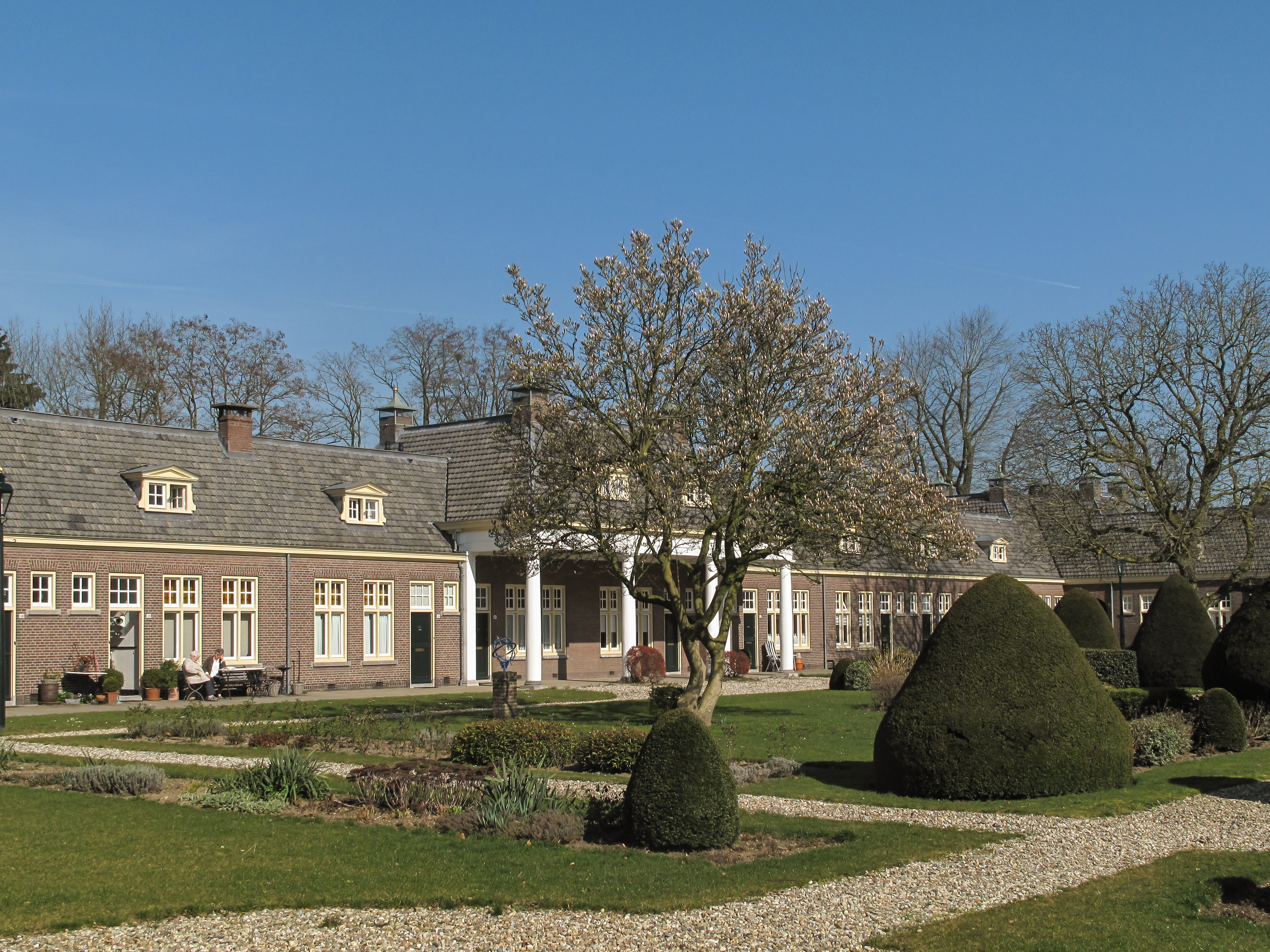
- Monumental house: Schweer bey der Beckehof

- Flag

- Location in the province of Gelderland in the Netherlands Dieren (Netherlands)
- Coordinates: 52°3′0″N 6°5′55″E
- Country: Netherlands
- Province: Gelderland
- Municipality: Rheden

Area
  - Total: 8.69 km^{2} (3.36 sq mi)
- Elevation: 17 m (56 ft)

Population (2021)
  - Total: 13,620
  - Density: 1,570/km^{2} (4,060/sq mi)
- Time zone: UTC+1 (CET)
  - Summer (DST): UTC+2 (CEST)
- Postal code: 6951-6953
- Dialing code: 0313

Dieren (Dutch pronunciation: [ˈdiːrə(n)]) is a town in the eastern Netherlands. It is located in Rheden, Gelderland, between Zutphen and Arnhem, on the bank of the IJssel.

Dieren was a separate municipality until 1818, when it became a part of Rheden.

The Gazelle bicycle factory is located in Dieren.

== History ==
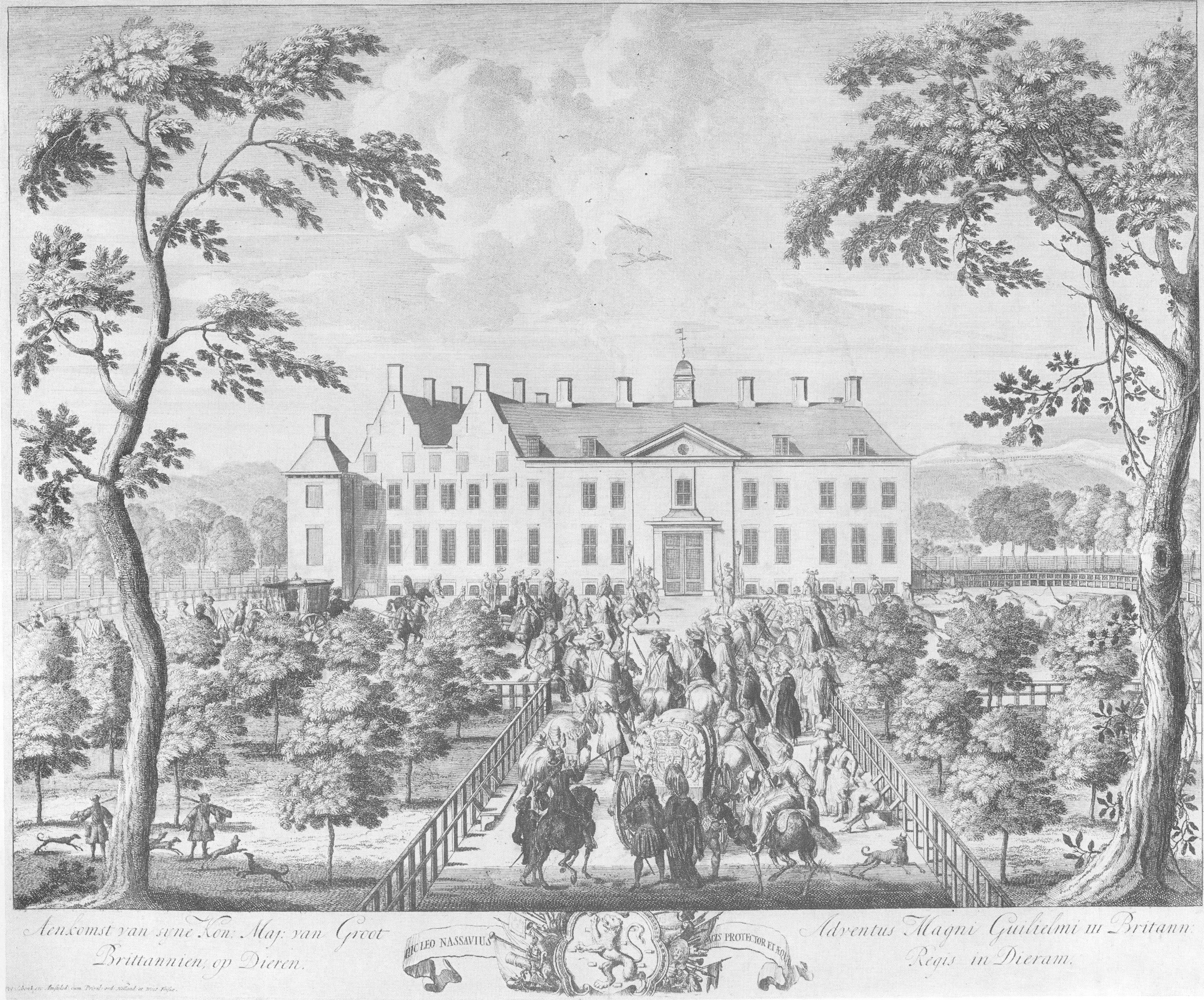
King William III of England arrives at the Hof te Dieren in 1691

"Hof te Dieren" was the house of the Dutch Stadtholder Frederik Hendrik of Orange, William II, Prince of Orange, William III of Orange and William IV of Orange. They enlarged the house and held hunting parties in the nearby woods. A road was built, connecting Dieren to The Hague, which is called the "Koningsweg". The road can still be found in many places in the Netherlands, such as Otterlo. The house was heavily damaged by Canadian soldiers during the liberation of the Netherlands, as they were under the wrong impression that German SS soldiers were located in the house. They were actually located in "Avegoor", a building located to the south-west of Dieren.

== Economy ==
=== Manufacturing ===
The Gazelle (bicycle) factory is located in Dieren and employs 550. It produces 300,000 bicycles a year, with a total production of over 13 million.

Dieren was home to the Lonka Dieren confectionery manufacturer (formerly known as Chocolade-en Suikerwerkenfabriek Donkers BV). Lonka Dieren was the leading manufacturer of pectin-based confectionery covered in chocolate in the Netherlands. Lonka Dieren has been in business over 75 years, and moved from Amsterdam in 1955 due to lack of space. In 2016, the factory again moved to Slovakia because of cost savings.

=== Tourism ===
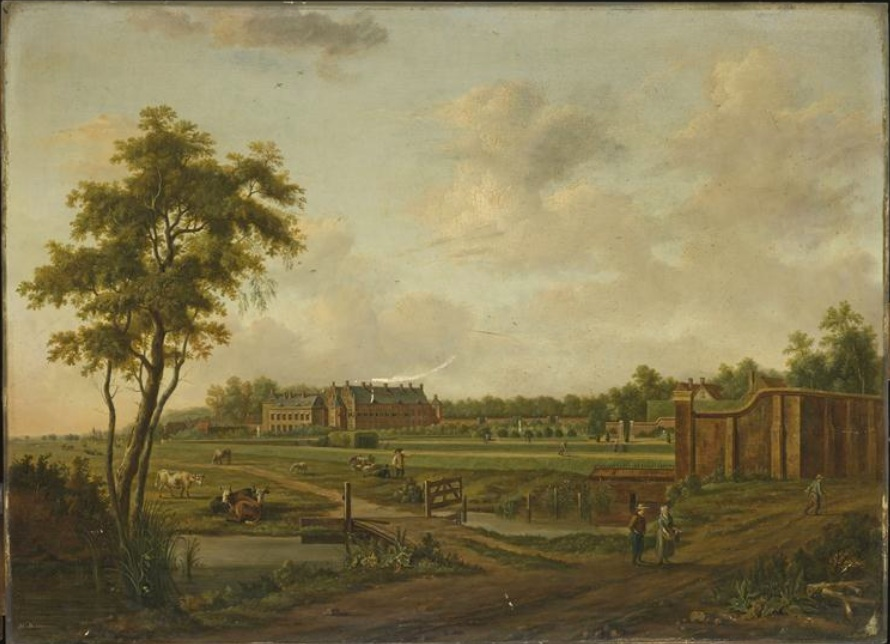
View of the Hof te Dieren, by Hendrik Frans de Cort, 18th century

Dieren is located on the edge of the Veluwezoom National Park. With over 12,000 acres, this nature reserve offers trails for hiking, bicycling or horseriding. There is also a mountain bike route. One feature of the park is the Carolina Hill with trails going out like spokes of a wheel in 14 directions. Wildlife includes deer and wild boar. The park is accessible via rail to the Dieren station and local bus to the entrance. There are also some parking lots at the entrance to the park.

Dieren is also at the start of the Apeldoorn Canal. Originally built for transportation, this canal is now used primarily for pleasure craft like waterbikes and canoes, on the southern end on the east side there is also bike trails.

The Uitvinderij in Dieren is a popular destination for school trips. It is a theme park where children play and discover. There is also an area where they can create works of art or mechanical objects.

The Veluwe Steam Railway run by the Veluwsche Stoomtrein Maatschappij (VSM). This steam train connects Dieren with Apeldoorn, running through Eerbeek and Beekbergen.

Dieren has a number of hotels and bed and breakfasts.

== Transportation ==
- Dieren railway station

== See also ==
- Van Dieren (surname)
