= Van Dieren (surname) =

Van Dieren or VanDieren is a Dutch surname referring to people from the town of Dieren. Notable people with this name include:

- Bernard van Dieren (1887–1936), Dutch composer and writer on music
- Monica VanDieren, American mathematician
- René van Dieren (born 1981), Dutch footballer

== See also ==
- Van Dieren, French publishing house
