= Santa Cruz Bicycles =

American bicycle manufacturer

Santa Cruz Bicycles, LLC
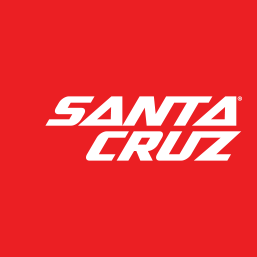
- Type: Division
- Founded: 1984; 42 years ago
- Founders: Rich Novak
- Headquarters: Santa Cruz, California, US
- Key people: Folkert Lamsvelt (CEO)
- Products: Bicycles
- Parent: Pon Holdings
- Website: santacruzbicycles.com

Santa Cruz Bicycles, LLC is an American division of Dutch conglomerate Pon Holdings that manufactures mountain bikes in Santa Cruz, California. They sponsor the Santa Cruz Syndicate, a downhill racing team. The company moved premises from 104 Bronson Street to 2841 Mission Street in 2013. Formerly owned by NHS, Inc. On July 3, 2015, Santa Cruz Bicycles was sold to Pon Holdings, a family-owned Dutch conglomerate with a bicycle division including brands such as Cervélo, Focus and Royal Dutch Gazelle.

== History ==
Santa Cruz Bicycles was founded by Rob Roskopp, Mike Marquez and Rich Novak in 1993. Roskopp had spent many years as a professional skateboarder, and Novak's Santa Cruz Skateboards company had put out a special "Roskopp" model before the two met. Roskopp and Novak went into partnership with bike engineer Mike Marquez, who had particular experience in bicycle suspension, and Tom Morris, a designer, to build some prototypes.

Their first bike, in 1994, was a full suspension bike called the Tazmon. It had an 80-millimetre (3.1 in) travel single-pivot design, the first on the market. It was followed a year later by the 100-millimetre (3.9 in) travel Heckler, a model that was discontinued for the 2016 model year and relaunched in 2020 as an e-bike.

The company acquired the patents for their Virtual Pivot Point (aka "VPP") from Outland Bikes around 1999.

== Models ==
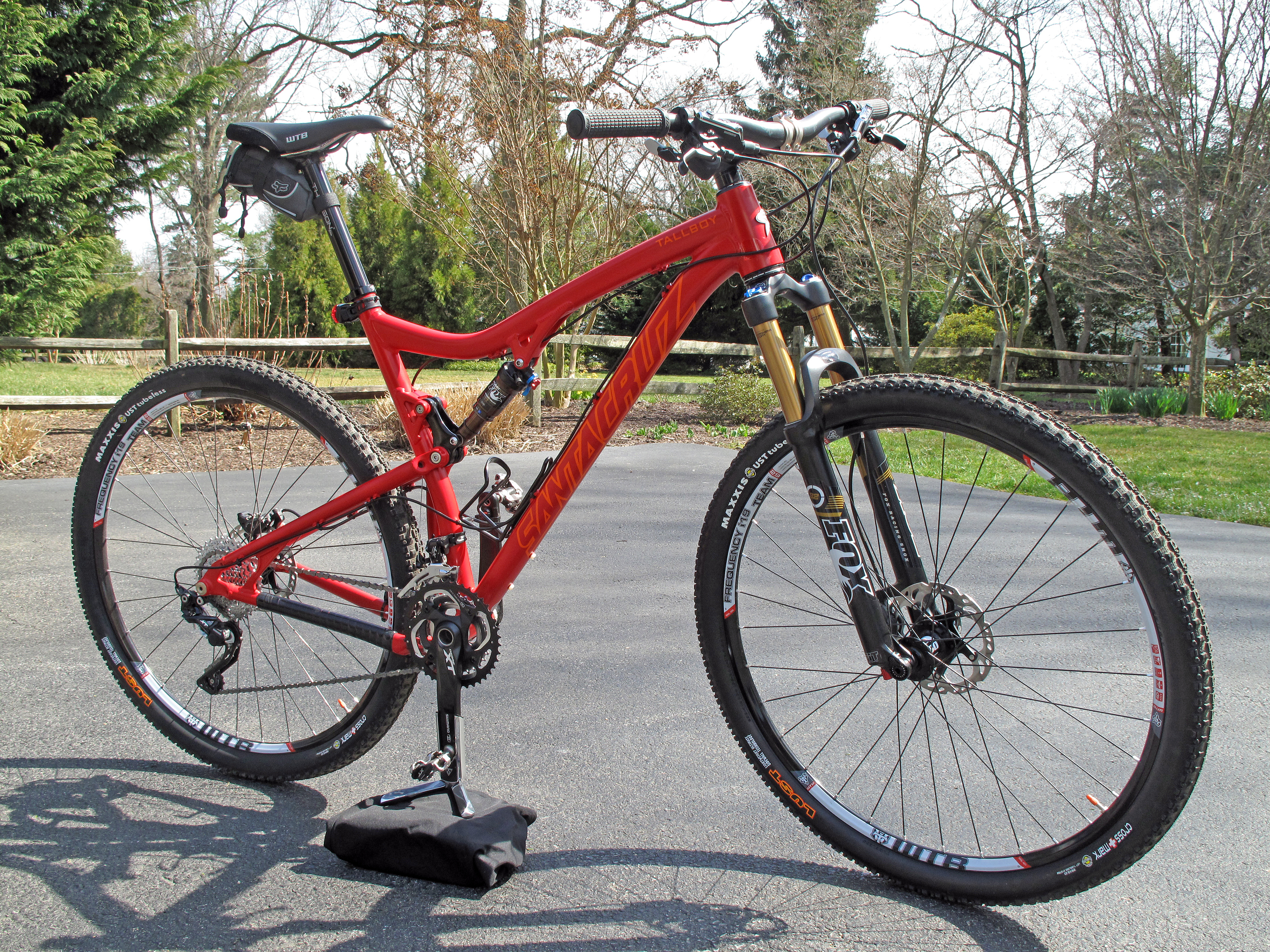
A 2013 Santa Cruz Tallboy mountain bike (aluminum frame)

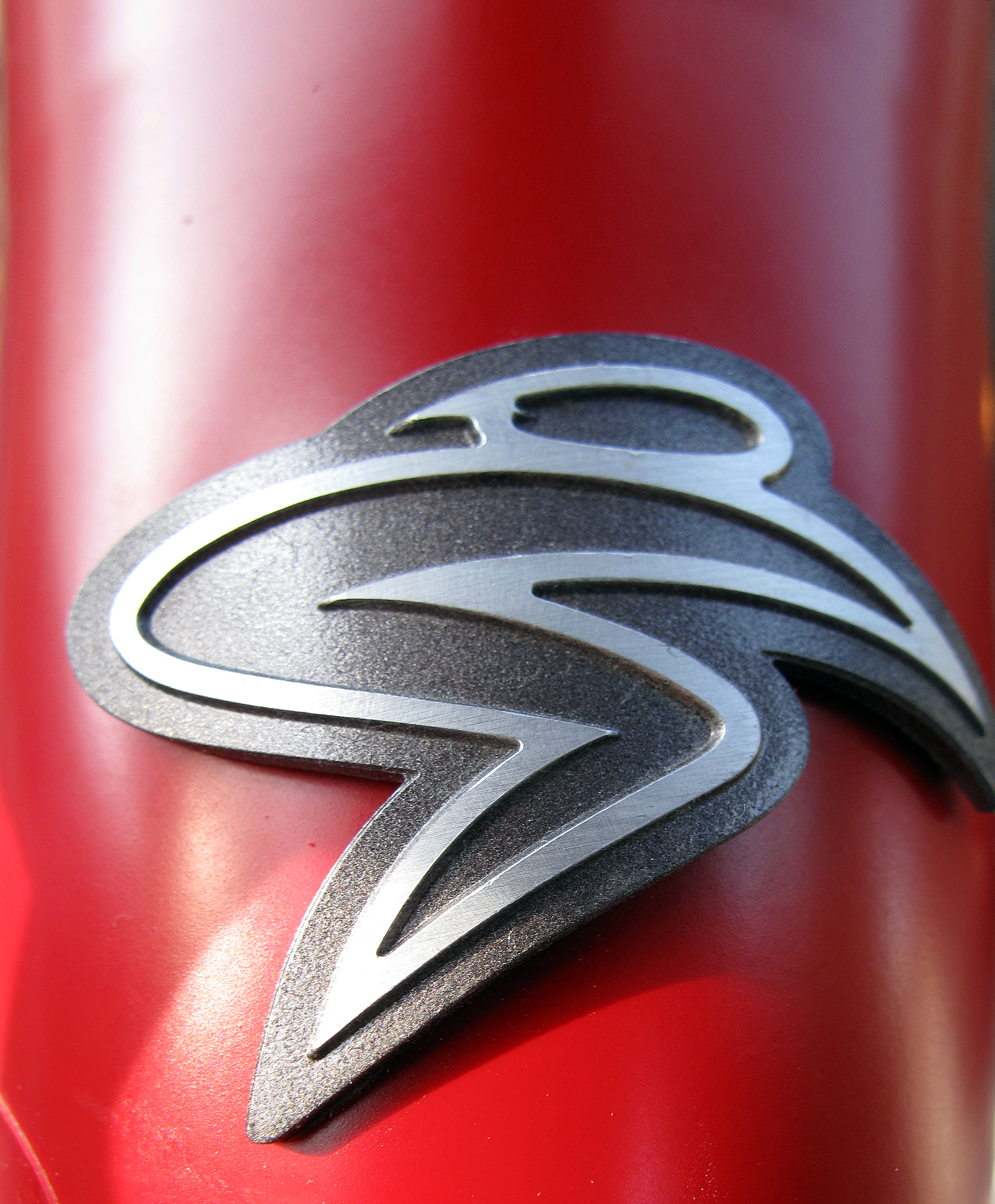
Santa Cruz head badge

The company manufactures around a dozen models of mountain bikes made of carbon fiber and aluminum, ranging from $1,500 to over $10,000 retail. Their bikes are suited to a wide range of mountain biking disciplines. Frame fabrication occurs in China and Taiwan, but all bicycles are assembled in Santa Cruz, built to customer specifications just before being shipped out.

In 2013, a single model, the "Juliana" was spun off as a stand-alone brand and range of mountain bikes for women, designed by and named for Juli Furtado.

In 2017, Santa Cruz announced the addition of carbon fiber wheels to their product lineup.

Current Santa Cruz/Juliana production models

- 5010/Furtado – MX (29" front wheel, 27.5" rear wheel), 130-millimetre (5.1 in) VPP Travel
- Blur/Wilder – 29" wheels, 2 options for suspension travel: XC (Blur only) and TR (Blur and Wilder). TR has 115-millimetre (4.5 in) Superlight Travel. XC has 107-millimetre (4.2 in) Superlight Travel (re-introduced in 2018)
- Tallboy/Joplin – 29" wheels, 120-millimetre (4.7 in) VPP Travel
- Bronson/Roubion – MX (29" front wheel, 27.5" rear wheel), 150-millimetre (5.9 in) VPP Travel
- Hightower – 29" wheels, 150-millimetre (5.9 in) VPP Travel
- Megatower – 29" wheels, 165-millimetre (6.5 in) VPP Travel
- Nomad – MX (29" front wheel, 27.5" rear wheel), 170-millimetre (6.7 in) VPP Travel
- V10 – MX (29" front wheel, 27.5" rear wheel) or 29" wheels, 208-millimetre (8.2 in) VPP Travel
- Chameleon – 29" wheels (MX compatible), hardtail trail bike, 130-millimetre (5.1 in) fork travel
- Highball – 29" wheels, hardtail XC bike, 100-millimetre (3.9 in) fork travel
- Stigmata – 700c wheels, cyclocross/gravel bike
- Heckler SL – MX (29" front wheel, 27.5" rear wheel), SL mountain e-bike, 150-millimetre (5.9 in) VPP Travel
- Vala – MX (29" front wheel, 27.5" rear wheel), full-power mountain e-bike, 150-millimetre (5.9 in)
- Bullit – MX (29" front wheel, 27.5" rear wheel), full-power mountain e-bike, 170-millimetre (6.7 in) (re-introduced as an e-bike in 2021)
- Skitch – 700c wheels, gravel/city e-bike

Current Santa Cruz production wheel models

- Reserve Carbon Wheels – 27.5 or 29" – 25, 27, 30, 37mm
- Reserve Aluminum Wheels – 27.5 or 29"

Discontinued models

- Bantam
- Blur LT
- Blur 4X
- Bullit (excluding relaunched e-bike)
- Butcher
- Driver 8
- Heckler (including relaunched e-bike)
- Hightower LT
- Jackal
- Juliana Cushtail
- Juliana Maverick
- Juliana Quincy
- Nickel
- Roadster
- Super 8
- Superlight
- Tallboy LT
- Tazmon
- VP Free

== Santa Cruz Syndicate ==
Santa Cruz Syndicate is a sponsored downhill team affiliated with the company. Current roster is, Jackson Goldstone, Andrea Kolb, Ellie Hulsebosch, and Nina Hoffmann.
