= Pon Holdings =

Dutch conglomerate in the transport sector

Pon Holdings BV

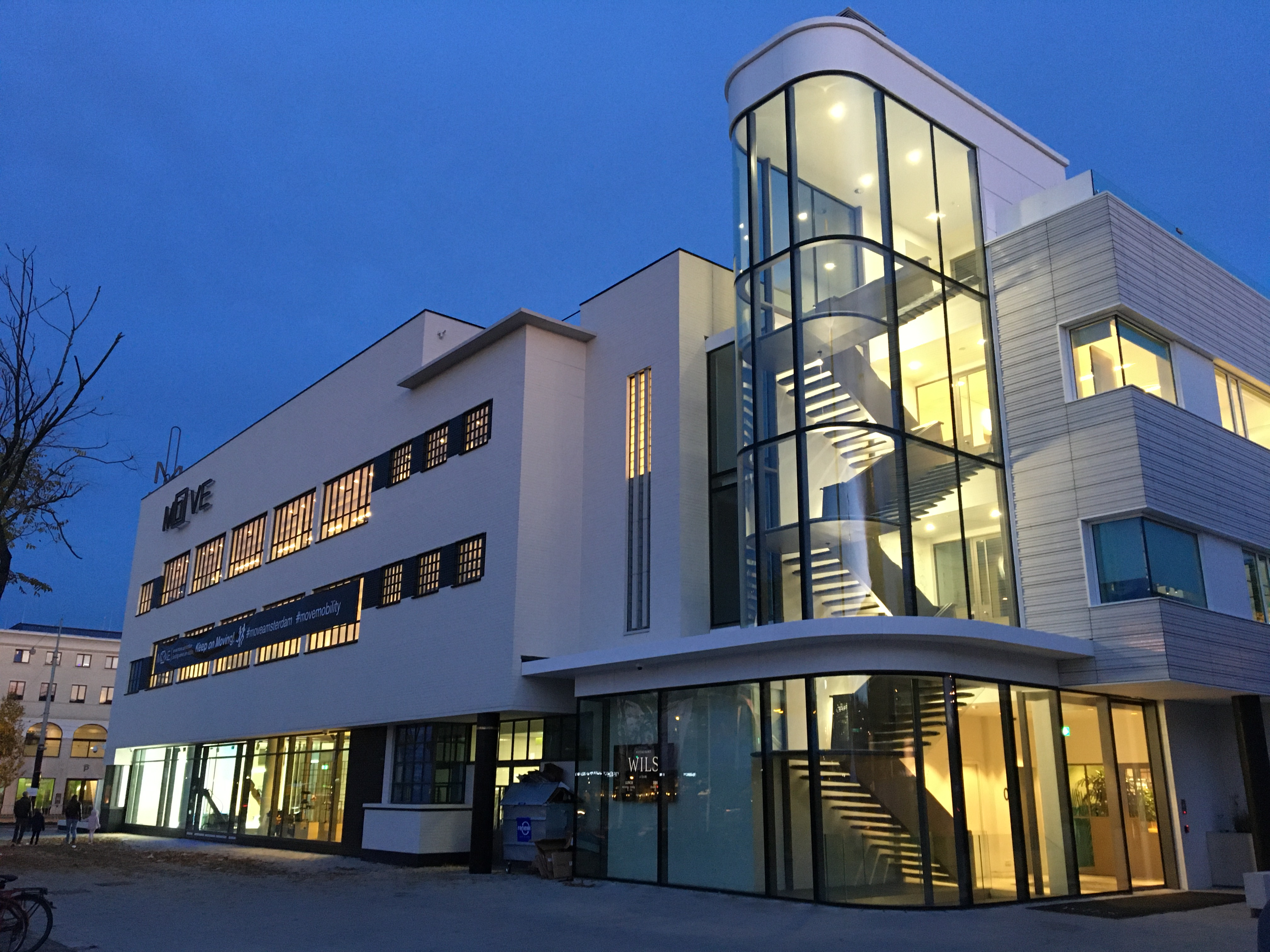
- Company type: Private
- Industry: Conglomerate
- Founded: 1980; 46 years ago
- Founder: Ben Pon, Jr.
- Headquarters: Stadionplein 28, Amsterdam
- Key people: Janus Smalbraak (Executive)
- Products: Automobile; Bicycles; Technology consulting Fire safety Agriculture
- Revenue: €2.1 billion (2024) (bicycle sales) €9.9 billion (2024) (total)
- Number of employees: 13,000
- Website: https://pon.com

Pon Holdings BV is a Dutch conglomerate in the transportation sector. It is one of the five largest bicycle manufacturers in the world, and owns bicycle brands Caloi, Cannondale, Cervélo, Derby Cycle (owner of Focus), GT, Gazelle, IronHorse, Kalkhoff, Mongoose, Santa Cruz, Urban Arrow (cargo bikes), Veloretti, and Schwinn, among others.

The company was founded in 1980 by Ben Pon, Jr., a former racing car driver and son of Ben Pon Sr., who became the importer of Volkswagen in the Netherlands in 1947. As of 2021 it is still owned by the Pon family.

== Activities ==
=== Cycling ===
Pon.bike owns Cervélo, Focus & Kalkhoff Holding (owner of Focus Bikes), Dorel Sports (parent company of Cannondale, Schwinn, GT Bicycles, Mongoose, Caloi, and IronHorse), Gazelle, Kalkhoff, Union, Santa Cruz Bicycles (owner of Reserve Wheels), Juliana Bicycles, PUBLIC Bikes, Swapfiets, Veloretti, BBB parts, Urban Arrow, Lease-a-Bike, BusinessBike, Fietsned service, Ride Out shop(s), Mike's Bike shops, Nimbl shoes, OneUp Components and others.

== History ==
- 1986: Takeover importership of SEAT
- 1988: Takeover of Transmark Groep, Motrac (Linde)
- 1992: Takeover importership of Škoda
- 1995: Founding of BelCompany in cooperation with Macintosh Retail Group
- 1998: Founding of Pon North America
- 2003: Takeover of Geveke N.V., Founding of Pon Equipment & Power Systems
- 2005: Founding of Pon Logistic Solutions, Shanghai, China
- 2011: Takeover of Gazelle
- 2011: Takeover importership of Cervélo.
- 2013: Acquisition of Callidus Group
- 2015: Acquisition of Santa Cruz Bicycles
- 2015: Takeover of Imtech Marine
- 2019: Acquisition of Urban Arrow
- 2019: Acquisition of indiGO Auto Group
- 2021: Acquisition of Mike's Bikes (a 12 store San Francisco Bay Area bicycle retailer)
- 2021: Acquisition of Dorel Sports
- 2021: Acquisition of Europcar S.A. (together with Volkswagen and Attestor)
- 2022: Takeover of Veloretti
- 2024: Sale of Pon Equipment Pon Power B.V., or Pepp B.V. for short, to the German Zeppelin Group. This division sold Caterpillar products in the Netherlands and Norway
- 2025: Stopping the Dutch bicycle brand Union and putting to pause the bicycle brand GT Bicycles.

=== Pre-dating Pon Holding ===
In 1895 Mijndert Pon operated a vehicle repair shop. His sons Ben and Wijnand took ownership of the company.

- 1931: Founding of Pon's Automobielhandel (by then a chain of car dealerships) by Ben and Wijnand Pon
- 1936: importership Continental AG and Federal
- 1947: importership Volkswagen
- 1948: importership Porsche
