= Mongoose (company) =

BMX Bicycle manufacturer

- Type: Subsidiary
- Industry: Bicycles
- Founded: September 1974; 52 years ago Simi Valley, California, U.S.
- Headquarters: Madison, Wisconsin, U.S.
- Products: Bicycle and Related Components
- Parent: Pon Holdings
- Website: www.mongoose.com

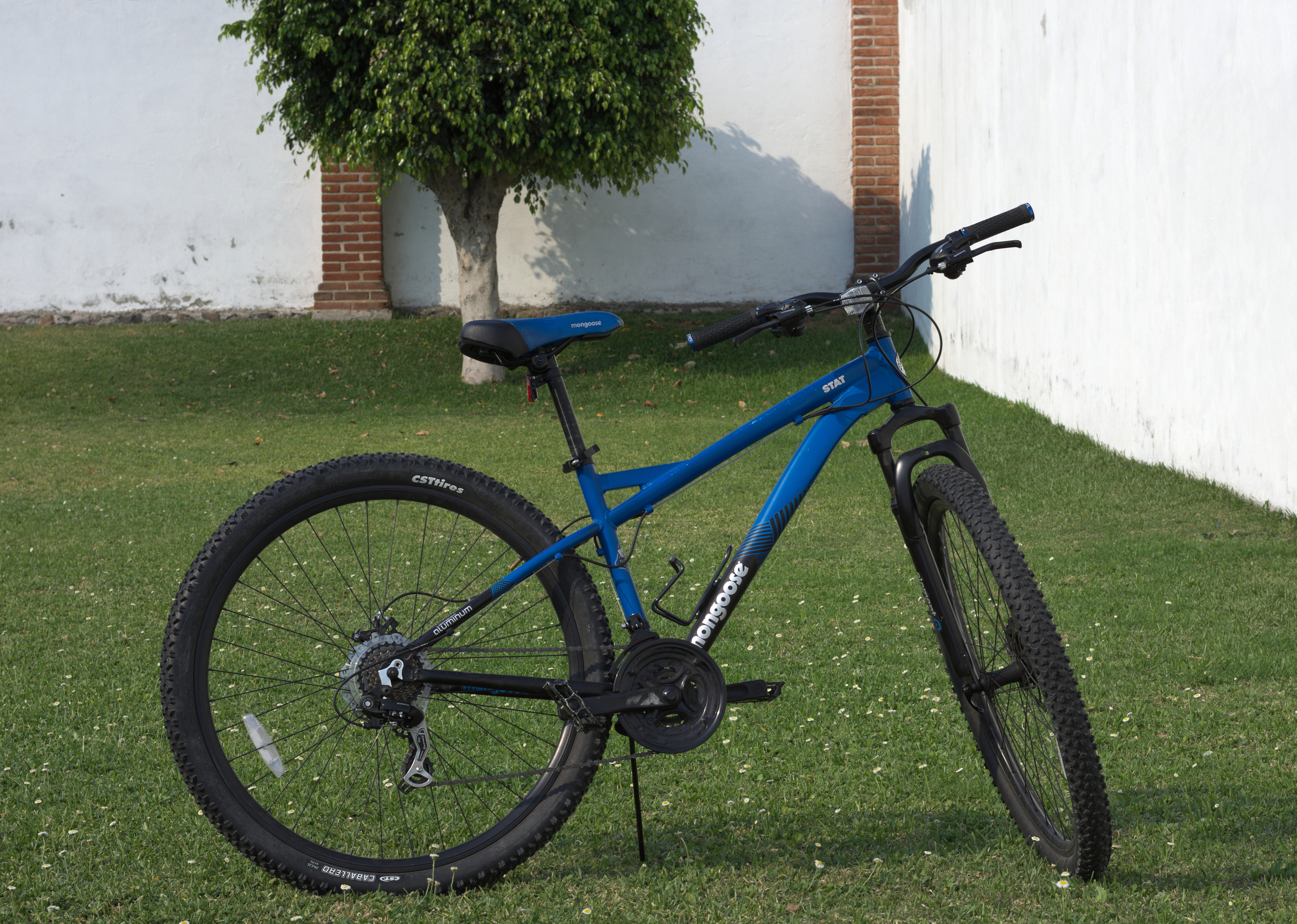
Mongoose bicycle

Mongoose is an American brand name of bicycles originally designed, manufactured, and sold by BMX Products, Inc. It is now available through the distributor Pacific Cycle.

== History ==
=== BMX Products, Inc. ===
Skip Hess started BMX Products, Inc. out of his home in Simi Valley, California, in September 1974 with his first product being the famous Motomag One wheel. According to Hess, at its largest stage of expansion, BMX Products, Inc. employed about 85 people. In its early years, Hess recalled that about 600 frames per day were produced at its Chatsworth, Los Angeles, location.

RECO (Racer Engineering Company) was a wholly owned manufacturing division created for insurance purposes to be separate from BMX Products, Inc, even though RECO was always produced in-house. It was headed by Vice President of Manufacturing Hoppy Brooks, in his attempt to market motorcycle frames.

=== Post-BMX Products ===
Mongoose was sold to American Group in 1985 and marketed by their Service Cycle subsidiary.

Bell Sports bought American Group in 1995 and sold Mongoose to Brunswick Outdoor Recreation Group in 1997.

Brunswick sold Mongoose to Pacific Cycle in 2000 and Pacific Cycle was bought by Montreal-based Dorel Industries in 2004. As of 2018, Mongoose models are available through Pacific Cycle in Madison, Wisconsin.

On 11 October 2021 Pon Holdings, headquartered in Amsterdam, the Netherlands announced that they acquired US-based bike company Dorel Sports.

== See also ==
- List of BMX bicycle manufacturers
