= Cannondale =

Bicycle company

Cannondale Bicycle Corporation

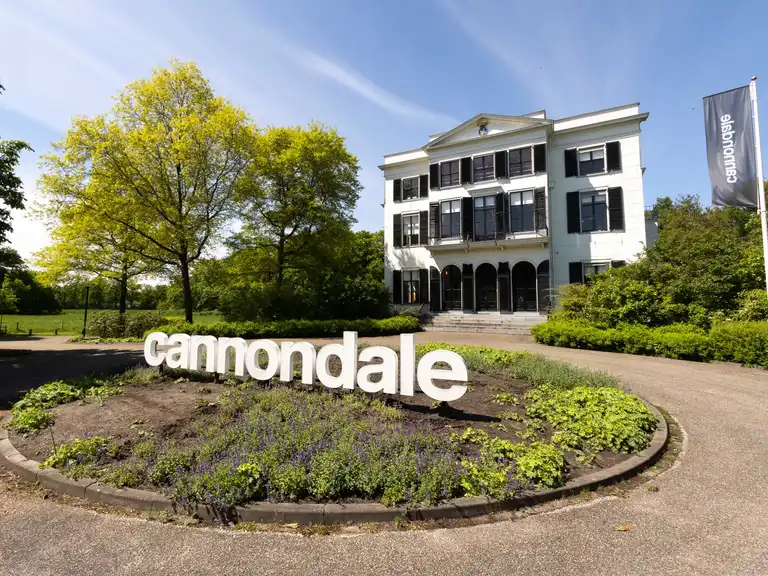
- Cannondale's Office in Woudenberg, Netherlands
- Type: Subsidiary
- Industry: Bicycles
- Founded: 1971; 55 years ago
- Headquarters: Wilton, Connecticut, United States
- Key people: Marco Kind (Managing Director)
- Products: Bicycle and Related Components
- Parent: Pon Holdings
- Website: cannondale.com

Cannondale Bicycle Corporation is an American division of Dutch conglomerate Pon Holdings that supplies bicycles and electric bicycles. As the smallest of the "Big Four" bicycle brands (including Specialized, Trek, and Giant), Cannondale has a reputation for innovative and unconventional designs.

Its main headquarters are in Wilton, Connecticut, near where the company was founded; with additional offices in Woudenberg, Netherlands; Freiburg, Germany; and Taichung, Taiwan. Frames are manufactured primarily in Taiwan, with some production in China, and Vietnam. Bikes are assembled at their facility in Almelo, Netherlands, and in Taiwan.

Cannondale bicycles are distributed through a network of approved independently owned bicycle shops throughout the US, Europe, and the UK, as well as distributors in more than 70 countries worldwide.

== History ==
The company was founded in 1971 by Joe Montgomery and Murdock MacGregor to manufacture precast concrete housing. Later Ron Davis came to Cannondale from CBS Laboratories where he was vice-president in charge of the development of microfilm reproduction. Davis had an idea for an internal combustion engine that would use ammonia as fuel. Davis, with MacGregor as his assistant, managed to duplicate and exceed results obtained by Allison Engine, then a division of General Motors. Faced with a commitment to invest a large amount of capital to take the project to a workable model installed in an automobile, Montgomery decided that the company should raise capital by developing and marketing other products that they had conceived. By now MacGregor and Davis had recruited two more CBS Laboratory alumni: John Wistrand, an industrial designer, and Jim Catrambone, in management. An air conditioner with no moving parts was a first effort.

Then Joe Montgomery, after a camping bike trip with his son, conceived "the Bugger" bicycle trailer. Ron Davis devised an under-seat hitch, a torsion spring made of Lexan. Wistrand designed the cloth bags and cargo carrier on the two models of trailers. Montgomery, in an effort repeated in numerous products, sourced the cloth components and oversaw their manufacture. At the New York Bicycle Show the team received requests from bike dealers who wanted to buy the bags. In less than six months Cannondale became the world's largest manufacturer of lightweight bicycle bags. Using a marketing plan devised by Montgomery, Cannondale secured orders from more than 2,500 dealers in less than 20 months. They then used the infrastructure developed to produce the bags to enter the camping goods market with backpacks and tents. Regarding the Bugger trailer, although Cannondale's marketing department claimed to be unaware of the connotations of that name in British English, some were, nevertheless, exported to the UK.

Todd Patterson, another designer/inventor, joined the company and developed the process for jigging and welding aluminum bicycle frames, enabling Cannondale to become a bicycle manufacturer.

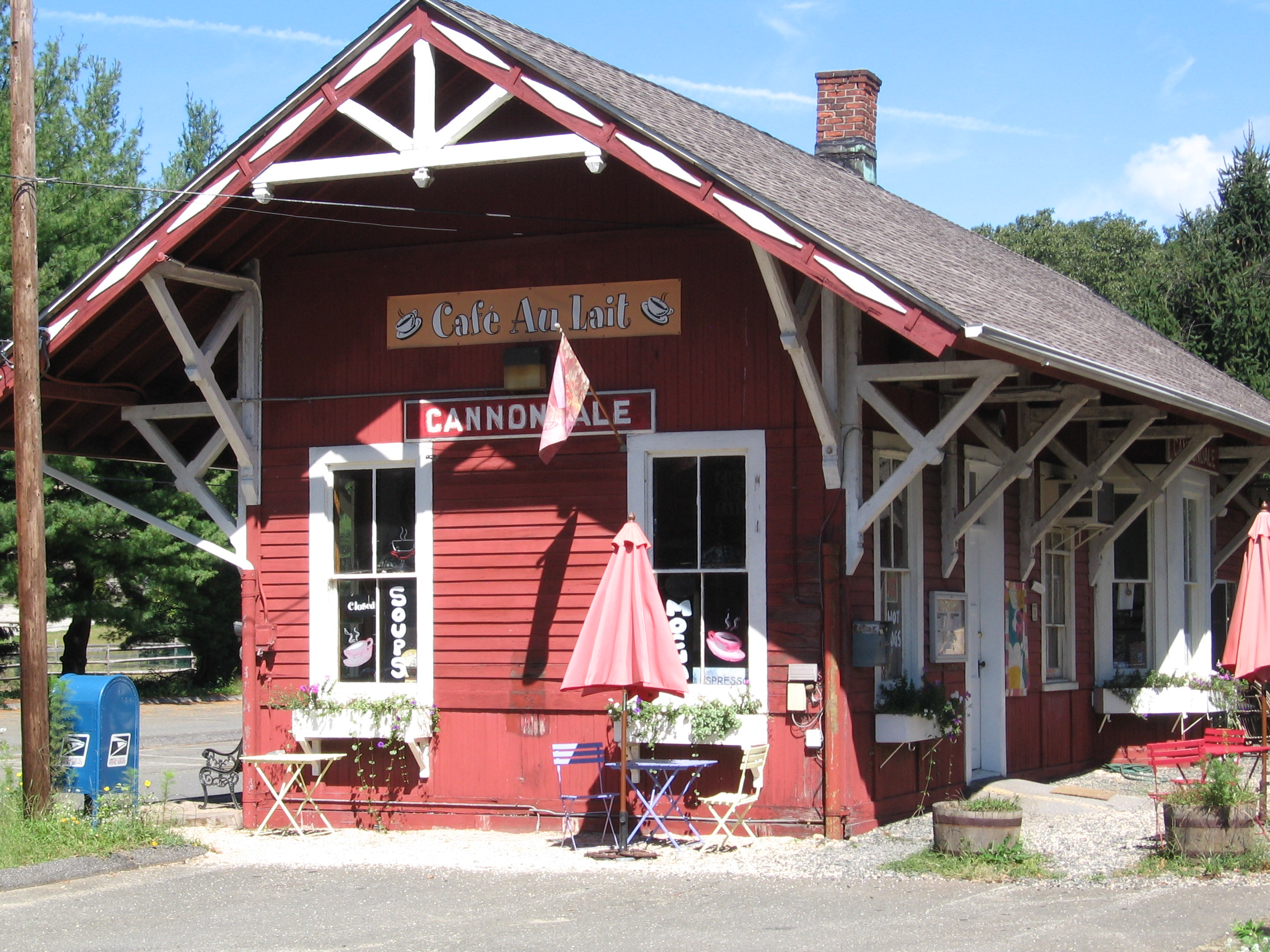
The Cannondale Metro North train station in Wilton, Connecticut, after which the company is named.

Today, Cannondale produces bicycles, although they are no longer hand-made in the US. Many bicycle frame manufacturers use many materials such as steel or titanium whereas Cannondale specializes in aluminum and carbon fiber, a technology in which they were pioneers.

The name of the company was taken from the Cannondale Metro North train station in Wilton, Connecticut. Another story as told in their 1983 catalog is that employee Pete Meyers was sent to order telephone service installation in 1970. When asked for the name of the business to be listed under, Meyers coined the name while looking at a rusty cannon inscribed "dale" and the sign on the Cannon railroad crossing. This story is apocryphal, however, and was an inside joke among the company owners and marketing team. In fact, the story dated back at least 10 years earlier when it was promoted in much the same language in Cannondale's marketing material, according to John Heenehan, then a high school student who worked part-time for over a year as a Cannondale employee, and who grew up on the same street as co-owner Ron Davis and was friends with his older son.

== Ownership ==
Originally a privately held company, Cannondale became publicly held after a $22 million IPO in 1995.

In the late 1990s Cannondale moved into the motorsports business, producing a line of off-road motorcycles and all-terrain vehicles. According to an interview with Cannondale Communications Director, Tom Armstrong, the company was unable to reduce the cost of their vehicles fast enough. As sales increased, the company was losing money on each motorbike. This gap drove the company into bankruptcy protection on January 29, 2003. Cannondale's full assets were then purchased at auction by Pegasus Capital Advisors fund Pegasus Partners II, L.P. Pegasus sold off the motorsport division and supported the company's renewed focus on bicycle production.

In February 2008, Dorel Industries, a Canada-based diversified consumer products company, announced the purchase of Cannondale from Pegasus Capital for approximately $200 million. Dorel also owned Pacific Cycle, a distributor of bicycles made in Taiwan and the People's Republic of China for sale under many historic U.S. cycle brands, including Schwinn, Mongoose, Roadmaster, and GT.

In April 2009 it was announced that all production would be transferred to Taiwan.

In January 2022, Pon Holdings, a Dutch mobility group, purchased Dorel Sports. Dorel Sports officially in hands of Pon Holdings.

== Products ==
=== Bicycle frames ===
On January 23, 2014, Dorel Industries announced a restructuring of operations in its recreational/leisure segment. This resulted in the closure of its assembly and testing facility in Bedford, Pennsylvania. The Bedford plant, which at one point produced Cannondale's midrange to high-end aluminum and aluminum/carbon fiber bikes, still handled some assembly, testing, quality control, and customer and technical services. Around 100 people were laid off. The Bedford facility was shuttered in 2015.

=== Notable Cannondale Road Bikes ===
==== CAAD design and manufacturing ====
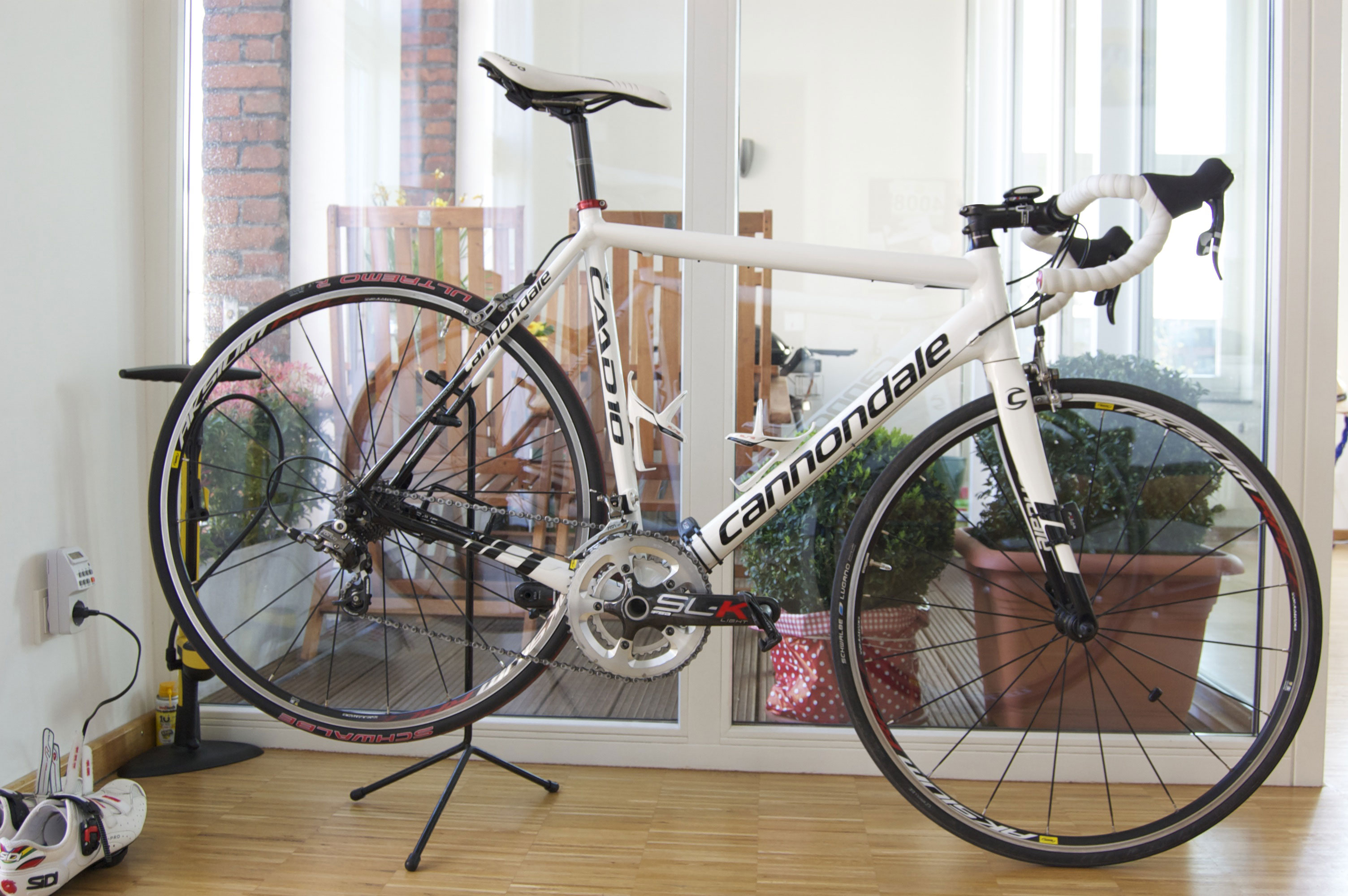
Cannondale CAAD10 (2011) with SRAM Force group

In 1992 Cannondale introduced the 2.8 series frame based on CAD (computer aided design) and finite element analysis to make a frame weighing only 2.8 lbs. The 2.8 series featured a tapered large diameter down tube, double-offset bottom-bracket cluster, ovalized top-tube, and double-butted seat tube to achieve the weight reduction. The same year the 1.25" Sub One all aluminum fork was introduced.

The "CAAD" designation itself first appeared in 1996 and stands for "Cannondale Advanced Aluminum Design". Initially it was applied to mountain bike frames - the CAAD2 on hybrid and touring models and the CAAD3 on F-Series cross-country hardtails. CAAD-badged mountain bike hardtails (CAAD3 through CAAD5) went on to win multiple UCI World Cup rounds, national and world championships, and Olympic medals, before Cannondale moved its mountain bike range to different naming conventions (such as Optimo and Furio) around 2003.

On the road side, Cannondale's CAAD3 arrived in 1997 as part of a deliberate push into European professional racing, most notably through sponsorship of the Saeco team, whose riders - including sprinter Mario Cipollini - helped establish oversized aluminum as a legitimate choice for elite competition after years of skepticism from European teams and framebuilders. The CAAD4 that followed was ridden by Cipollini to Tour de France stage wins. Subsequent generations continued to refine the platform: CAAD6 introduced the BB30 oversized bottom-bracket standard alongside Cannondale's HollowGram crankset; CAAD7 was ridden by Gilberto Simoni to victory at the 2003 Giro d'Italia, and CAAD8 by Damiano Cunego at the 2004 Giro d'Italia - by some accounts the last two Grand Tours won on aluminum-frame bicycles.

CAAD9 launched in 2007 and became the first version of the line marketed as a standalone platform rather than simply a frame designation, and by 2009 was offered with component groups up to Shimano Dura-Ace level, an unusual move for an aluminum frame at the time. CAAD10 followed with frame shapes that anticipated the first SuperSix EVO, and CAAD12 (Cannondale skipped the number 11 entirely, without a stated technical reason) added disc-brake compatibility. CAAD13, launched in 2020, adopted dropped seatstays and aerodynamically profiled tubing intended to mimic the SuperSix EVO road bike; Cannondale later described this direction as a departure from the CAAD line's traditional identity. In March 2026, Cannondale released the CAAD14, explicitly returning to a traditional round-tube silhouette and smooth-welded aluminum construction rather than carbon-mimicking aerodynamic shaping, while adding modern features including a UDH-compatible derailleur hanger, the Delta Steerer front-end design shared with other current Cannondale models, and tire clearance up to 32mm.

==== Synapse (2006) ====
Cannondale introduced the Synapse in 2006 as Cannondale's first full-carbon-fiber road bike, built specifically for endurance and sportive riders rather than pure racing, with a relaxed geometry and a "SAVE" micro-suspension system built into the frame to smooth out rough road surfaces. It grew out of an earlier, less radical model called the Road Warrior, introduced in 2002 as a more relaxed alternative to Cannondale's increasingly race-focused CAAD aluminum bikes. A substantially redesigned second-generation Synapse launched in 2014 (previewed and raced through the 2013 Spring Classics, including Paris-Roubaix, by riders such as Peter Sagan), introducing BallisTec Hi-MOD Hi-Mod carbon construction shared with the SuperSix EVO, race bike, an upgraded "SAVE Plus" compliance system combining a shaped fork, seatstays, and a narrow 25.4mm seatpost, and a claimed sub-kilogram frame weight for the top-tier Hi-Mod version. The Synapse was redesigned again in 2018, moving to a disc-brake-only lineup with a new carbon layup, a lighter claimed frame weight of 918 grams, and wider tire clearance, while keeping its relaxed endurance geometry.

Lachlan Morton riding the Cannondale Synapse on his ride around Australia

In September-October 2024, EF Pro Cycling rider Lachlan Morton rode a then-unreleased prototype of the next-generation Synapse on a 14,200-kilometre lap of Australia, completing the ride in 30 days, 9 hours, and 59 minutes - breaking the previous circumnavigation record by more than a week. The bike underwent its official public launch in May 2025 as a sixth-generation Synapse, and Cannondale built its launch marketing around Morton's ride, releasing a campaign titled "The Only Mate You Need" that credited the record-breaking lap as real-world proof of the redesigned bike's durability and comfort. The new generation also brought a lighter and more aerodynamically shaped frame, further increased tire clearance, integrated "StashPort" in-frame storage, and the second generation of Cannondale's SmartSense integrated lights-and radar safety system; it was subsequently named Road Bike of the Year by BikeRadar. Throughout its history, the Synapse has been marketed as a bridge between comfort-oriented ednurance riding and race-level performance, a positioning Cannondale has leaned into further with each successive generation.

==== SuperSix Evo (2008) ====
In 2008 Cannondale introduced their primary road-racing bicycle the SuperSix EVO. The bike traces back to the original SuperSix, a round-tubed carbon frame known for its ride quality and low weight, before the third-generation EVO shifted toward a lightweight-aero design that has largely defined the platform ever since. The fifth generation, launched in early 2026 lowered the frame's front end stack and introduced a claimed four-watt aerodynamic saving of 45 km/h, with top-end builds weighing as little as 6.35 kg. The redesign also merged Cannondale's separate lightweight-climbing and aerodynamic road bikes into a single platform, rendering the brand's dedicated SystemSix aero bike redundant despite it remaining a benchmark in its category. Cannondale positions the SuperSix EVO as a race-focused bike built for speed, and it is used by the EF Pro Cycling Team.

=== Electric bicycles ===
An electric bicycle manufactured by Cannondale Sports Group LLC includes a battery module based on Toshiba's quick-charging lithium ion titanite rechargeable battery "SCiB".

==== Moterra (2016) ====
in 2016 Cannondale launched the Moterra, marking the company's first full-suspension electric mountain bike platform and its first major entry into the eMTB category. It was first shown at Eurobike in September 2016 and released in 2017 as a plus-tire (27.5"+) full -suspension e-MTB, launched alongside a longer-travel "LT" variant built for alpine enduro riding with 160mm of travel front and rear. The platform later moved to 29" wheels and 150mm of travel and a 165-170mm mullet-wheel configuration (Moterra LT), using a Horst-link derived suspension design and Bosch's Performance Line CX motor, with carbon frames sold in Europe and aluminum frames in North America. In 2024, Cannondale introduced the Moterra SL, a lighter full-power e-MTB using a custom-tuned Shimano EP801 motor rather than Bosch, which was named the Electric Bike of the Year by Singletrack World Magazine. In April 2025, Cannondale gave both the standard Moterra and Moterra LT complete ground-up redesigns, sharing a new front triangle, motor, and batter, with the Moterra SL but retaining distinct swingarms, geometry, and "Proportional Response" size-specific suspension kinematics for each model. In March 2026, Cannondale released an updated Moterra Alloy for the North American market, adding Bosch's eMTB+ riding mode, a choice of 600Wh or 800Wh batteries, and revised geometry.

==== Tesoro Neo ====
An Electric touring and commuter range launched in 2019 with the road-oriented Tesoro Neo and the more rugged, MTB-inspired Tesoro NeoX, aimed at mixed-surface riding and bikepacking and dual-battery-reeady frames on higher-spec models. In late 2023, Cannondale added the Tesoro Neo Carbon, a lighter (approximately 16kg), sportier variant with a carbon frame borrowing design cues from the Synapse road bike, sold initially only in Europe.

==== Adventure Neo ====
An electric city/comfort bike launched in February 2021 for March 2021 availability, with a step-through frame option, front-and-rear suspension, and - on top-spec models - a Garmin collaboration rear radar sensor. An "Allroad" variant with wider tires and a more rugged fork was added in subsequent years.

==== Treadwell Neo ====
An electric hybrid/city bike designed to disguise its e-bike identity with a hidden hub motor; it introduced the wheel-sensor/smartphone app technology (tracking speed, distance, and service reminders) later reused across other Neo-series models.

==== Compact Neo ====
a 20-inch-wheel, partially folding urban e-bike (foldable stem and pedals) announced in November 2022 and marketed as Cannondale's lightest e-bike at the time, styled as a modern successor to the brand's earlier (non-electric) Hooligan compact bike.

==== Cargowagen Neo and Wonderwagen Neo ====
Cannondale's first full-size cargo e-bikes, launched together in 2023. The Cargowagen Neo is a class-3 longtail cargo bike with a rear cargo rack; the Wonderwagen Neo is a front-loading "bakfiets" style bike with a child-rated cargo box, sold only in the European market. These followed a smaller-scale 2022 entry into the category, the compact Neo-adjacent "compact Neo" folding bike is not a cargo model, but Cannondale's cargo range traces infromally to an earlier, smaller cargo bike sold only in limited markets prior to the 2023 launch.

==== Mavaro Neo ====
A comfort-oriented electric city bike line introduced in 2023, later expanded with the lighter-weight Mavaro Neo SL variant using a Bafang rear-hub motor in place of Bosch, aimed at reducing overall weight relative to the standard model.

==== Flying V ====
Cannondale FlyingV

A lightweight urban e-bike announced in early November 2025, which Cannondale markets as the first all-carbon urban e-bike, with a carbon frame, carbon fork, and molded carbon mudguards. Its dropped, split-top-tube "V" frame silhouette deliberately recalls the Delta V mountain bikes of the early 1990s (see Delta V, below) and the later Hooligan compact bike, and was designed at Cannondale's development center in Freiburg, Germany; the bikes are assembled in the Netherlands. The FlyingV prioritizes low eight over maximum power, pairing the frame with Bosch's lightweight Performance Line SX Motor (60 Nm of torque and 600 W peak output) and an integrated 400 Wh battery, for a complete-bike weight of just over 18 kg (about 40 lb). It is offered in two versions: the Flying V 1, which uses Shimano Nexus 5-speed internal hub with Di2 electronic shifting, and the FlyingV 2, which uses a mechanical Nexus hub; both use a Gates carbon belt drive in place of a chain, and include an integrated rear rack rated for 18 kg, integrated lighting and an SPC+ phone mount on the stem that connects to the Cannondale app. The bike won a Design & Innovation Award in 2026.

=== Notable Cannondale mountain bikes ===
==== SM-500 (1984) ====
The 1984 SM-500 All-Terrain Bicycle was Cannondale's first mountain bike. The front wheel was 26 inches in diameter whereas the rear wheel was only 24 inches large "to increase traction for climbing in steep, muddy terrain", Cannondale said. The frame was TIG welded from 6061 aluminium alloy and was fully heat treated. The same material and treatment Cannondale would use for all welded aluminum frames until the release of frames made from Alcoa Alcalyte Optimo alloy in 2003. The fork was made from chrome moly steel. The componentry on the SM-500 was a mixture of parts from Shimano Deore XT, Suntour, Specialized and Dia-Compe. The bike had a 3x5 drive train offering 15 gears, and cantilever brakes in the front and U-brakes in back. The bike retailed for $595 (approximately equivalent to $1640 in 2021–USD) in the United States.

==== SE (1991) ====
The SE was Cannondale's first frame with rear suspension, called Elevated Suspension Technology (E.S.T), a rear triangle with a high pivot and elevated chain stays. SE models were sold with rigid Cannondale Pepperoni aluminum forks and Girvin Flexstem stems. The bikes shipped with Cannondale's Force 40 system to increase the braking power.

==== Delta V (1992) ====
The Delta V was the first bike to introduce Cannondale's Delta V (later Headshok) suspension fork where the shock is integrated into the head tube. The Delta V was sold as a full-suspension bike with the E.S.T rear triangle, or as a "front suspension only" bike with a normal rigid frame (the term "hardtail" had not been invented). The original Delta V fork offered approximately 45–50 mm of travel and used an oil-damped air spring. The telescope of the Delta V fork had a square cross-section and instead of bushings, needle bearings were used to minimize stiction. Delta V forks were stiffer and more responsive than other suspension forks at the time.

Since the Delta V fork was taller than normal forks, the top end of head tube of Delta V frames was significantly higher. To not sacrifice stand-over clearance, Cannondale made a "V-style" top tube from two tubes – a very controversial design. Like other Cannondale mountain bike frames, the Delta V frame had a 50.8 mm (2 inches) down tube.

The full-suspension version was discontinued in 1994 in favor of the Super V. In 1994, the hardtail's rear triangle was updated and was identical to the rear in the F series frames. The Delta V hardtail was finally retired in 1995 and replaced by the F series. The two-tube top tube design remained in use for the smallest frame size and reappeared in the Gemini and Prophet models.

==== Super V (1993) ====
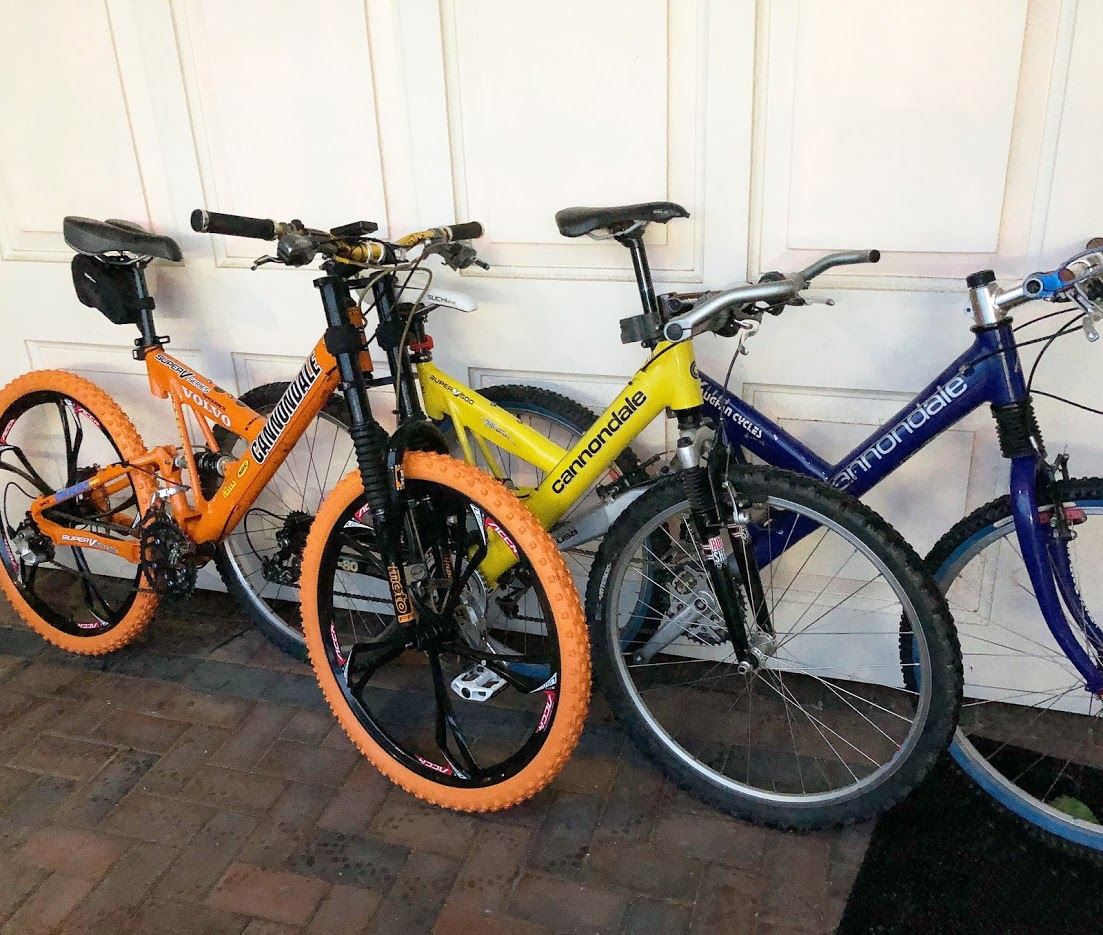
Cannondale Super V

The Super V was a full-suspension bike manufactured by Cannondale. Instead of a main triangle, Cannondale uses an oversized down tube and a mast to hold the seat. The rear wheel is suspended by a high-pivot aluminum swingarm providing about 75 mm of travel. The front wheel is guided by a Delta V fork.

Missy Giove won the 1994 downhill world championship on a Super V.

In 1995, the welded aluminum banana swingarm was replaced by a carbon-fiber version. This was Cannondale's first carbon-fiber product.

In 1996, Cannondale changed the swingarm and lowered the pivot for the "Super V Active" to minimize pedal kickback present high-pivot swingarm designs. Different versions of the Super V Active frame and swingarm were made with travels of 80, 100, or 120 mm. Some models in 2000 and 2001 shipped with a new, bonded aluminum swingarm that was less expensive.

The Super V was discontinued in 2003.

==== V 4000 (1993) ====
The V 4000 was a non-functional full-suspension concept bike that never went into production, yet it caught attention due its futuristic design. The frame and the wheels were machined from aluminum. The highlight of the design was the suspension, two single-sided swingarms. Cannondale's president at the time, Joe Montgomery, said he would eat his hat if the V 4000 wouldn't be in the shops in the next season. Although Cannondale promised additional information later in the year, it was never revealed how the suspension was planned to work. The V 4000 was widely considered a show bike for magazines and trade shows, and Montgomery eventually ate his hat. The V 4000 was the first in a row of concept bikes Cannondale presented.

==== Killer V (1994) ====
The Killer V was a version of the Delta V without a suspension fork but with a 1.25" rigid Pepperoni fork. The down tube diameter was increased from 50.8 mm to 58 mm which made the bike very stiff.

==== F (1995) ====
The F was the front suspension bike line with Cannondale's suspension forks, called "Headshok" since 1994. In contrast to the Delta V frame, the F series had a straight top tube. The frame was available with either a swagged ("2.8 series", later "CAAD 3") or a straight ("3.0 series", later "CAAD 2") down tube. The rear triangle features wishbone seat stays.

Alison Sydor won 3 cross-country world-championships (1994–1996), and a silver medal at the 1996 Olympic Games on this bike.

==== Super V Raven (1997) ====
The Raven was a version of the Super V with a carbon-aluminum frame. It was the first bicycle frame by Cannondale made with carbon-fiber. Instead of an aluminum weldment, the main frame of the Raven was made of a cast and machined aluminum spine bonded between two carbon-fiber shells. The rear triangle was identical to the aluminum Super V's. The frame was updated in 2000. After a recall in 2001 of all Raven II frames due to failures of the pivot and bottom bracket area, the Raven was discontinued in 2002. The Raven frame was hollow and a large sound box.

==== Jekyll (2001) ====
The Jekyll was a full-suspension bike using the same swingarm as the contemporary Super V but with a traditional down tube and top tube design. The rear shock mount in the frame was adjustable such that the head tube and seat tube angles could be changed by the rider. Initially, the Jekyll came with 120 mm rear travel, and 135 mm from 2003 on. The front suspension was typically a Cannondale Headshok Fatty or a Cannondale Lefty. The Jekyll was discontinued in 2006.

Cannondale revived the Jekyll name in 2011 for a new full-suspension enduro platform, ridden by Jerome Clementz to the 2013 Enduro World Series Overall title. The Jekyll nameplate was substantially redesigned again in 2021 around a high-pivot suspension layout Cannondale calls "Guidler" in which an idler pulley positioned high on the frame doubles as a chain guide, intended to give the rear wheel an over rearward axle path over rough terrain.The Redesign moved the Jekyll exclusively to 29-inch wheels with a fixed 165mm of rear travel and 170mm-travel fork, replacing the previous generations adjustable-travel "Gemini" flip-chip system with a single geometry setting and housing the rear shock inside a twin-spar downtube. The Jekyll continues to use Cannondale's Ai asymmetric rear-wheel offset for additional tire clearance.

==== Scalpel (2002) ====
The Scalpel was a light-weight full-suspension bike designed for cross-country racing with flexible carbon-fiber chain stays instead of a pivot, providing 63 mm of rear travel and 67 mm from model year 2003 on. In 2008, Cannondale introduced an all-carbon Scalpel, and moved the rear shock to enable 100 mm travel. The 26-inch version was discontinued in 2013 when Cannondale finished to 29-inch wheels for cross-country bikes.

Alan Hatherly riding the Cannondale Scalpel for CFR.

The Scalpel has remained in continuous production since its introduction and is now in its eighth generation. The current version, launched in March 2024, increased travel to a consistent 120mm front and rear, updated Geometry for increasingly technical modern World Cup courses, and dropped the Ai asymmetric offset in favor of standard components, while retaining the Carbon "FlexPivot" rear-suspension design (by this point functionally similar to the technology later used on the Moterra SL e-mountain bike). It is offered in both full-suspension and hardtail (F-Si) configurations, and its debut season included the 2024 Olympic bronze medal, UCI-Cross Country World Championship, and World Cup overall title, all won by Alan Hatherly, along with both cross-country marathon World Championships.

==== Chase (2005) ====
The Chase was a dirt-jump bike developed with Cannondale sponsored rider Aaron Chase. The Chase was discontinued in 2010 and it remained the first and only dirt-jump bike made by Cannondale until the introduction of the Dave in 2021.

==== Habit (2016) ====
The Habit was introduced in 2016 as a "do-it-all" trail bike, initially on 27.5-inch wheels before moving to a 29-inch-wheel, 130mm-travel platform. It filled the gap in Cannoondale's lineup between the race-oriented Scalpel and the longer-travel Jekyll, aimed at riders wanting one bike capable of both long climbs and technical descents rather than a specialized race machine. It has remained in Cannondale's range through multiple generations and is offered alongside a long-travel "Habit LT" Variant.

==== Bad Habit (2016) ====
The bad Habit launched alongside the Habit in 2016 as a plus-tire (27.5+) variant built for additional traction and stability. It was substantially redesigned and relaunched in April 2026 as a distinct, longer-travel model in its own right, sitting between the Habit LT and Jekyll with 155mm of rear-wheel travel and 160mm-travel fork. The 2026 redesign marked a deliberate move away from several of Cannondale's long-standing proprietary design elements: it dropped the Ai asymmetric rear-wheel offset for a standard 55mm chainline, used a conventional pivot rather than the FlexPivot system found on the Scalpel and Moterra SL. It also adopted a mixed-wheel ("mullet") setup - a 29-inch front and 27.5-inch rear wheel - with no flip-chip to change configurations. Cannondale attributed the redesign to feedback from its factory racing program, and the new Bad Habit won the 2025 UCI Enduro World Cup title with rider Ella Connolly.

=== Notable Cannondale Gravel Bikes ===
==== SuperX (2011) ====
Allison Jackson Riding the SuperX.

The SuperX was introduced in 2011 as Cannondale's dedicated carbon cyclocross race bike, distinguished by horizontal top tube for easy shouldering and used by national champions including Tim Johnson and Stephen Hyde. In 2021, Cannondale retired the SuperX name and consolidated its cyclocross and gravel racing bikes under the SuperSix EVO nameplate as the SuperSix EVO CX and SuperSix EVO SE, an attempt to simplify the brand's naming that the company later acknowledged had instead caused consumer confusion. In February 2025, Cannondale revived the SuperX name for a ground-up redesign positioned as a dedicated gravel-race platform, while stating it remained cyclocross-capable. The new bike dropped Cannondale's proprietary Ai asymmetric rear-end offset in favor of industry-standard components, adopted aerodynamically shaped tubing and a triangular "Delta" steerer borrowed from the SuperSix EVO, and increased tire clearance to 48mm at the rear and 51mm at the front. The top-tier LAB71 SuperX frame weighs under 900 grams. Cannondale credited its predecessor, the SuperSix EVO SE, ridden to a course-record win at the 2024 Unbound Gravel race by Lachlan Morton, as a key influence on the redesigned bike's engineering.

Slate (2016)

The Cannondale Slate marked the brand's first entry into the emerging gravel bike segment. The bike had 650b wheels and a short-travel Lefty Oliver fork. The Slate was the first suspension-equipped drop-bar gravel bike from a major manufacturer. Cannondale discontinued the slate in 2019 after the launch of the Topstone.

===== Topstone (2019) =====
In 2019 Cannondale introduced the Topstone as part of the company's expansion of its off-road and mixed-surface product range. The model was conceived in response to the rapid growth of gravel cycling during the 2010s. The Topstone built on Cannondale's earlier experience with endurance road bikes and adventure-oriented designs such as the Slate. The Topstone provided increased tire clearance, comfort, and cargo-carrying capability for long-distance riding and bikepacking. the platform later became notable for introducing Cannondale's proprietary Kingpin suspension system, a rear compliance design intended to improve rider comfort and traction without the weight and complexity of a traditional rear shock. Since its introduction, the Topstone has expanded into aluminum, carbon, and electric-assist variants. On October 13th 2026 Cannondale announced the launch of the Topstone CAAD, which features a SmartForm aluminum frame derived from the company's CAAD aluminum frame design program.

=== Technology and Engineering ===
Cannondale has built its brand identity around proprietary engineering some of which has been widely adopted across the industry and some of which as remained unique to the brand.

==== Lefty Fork ====
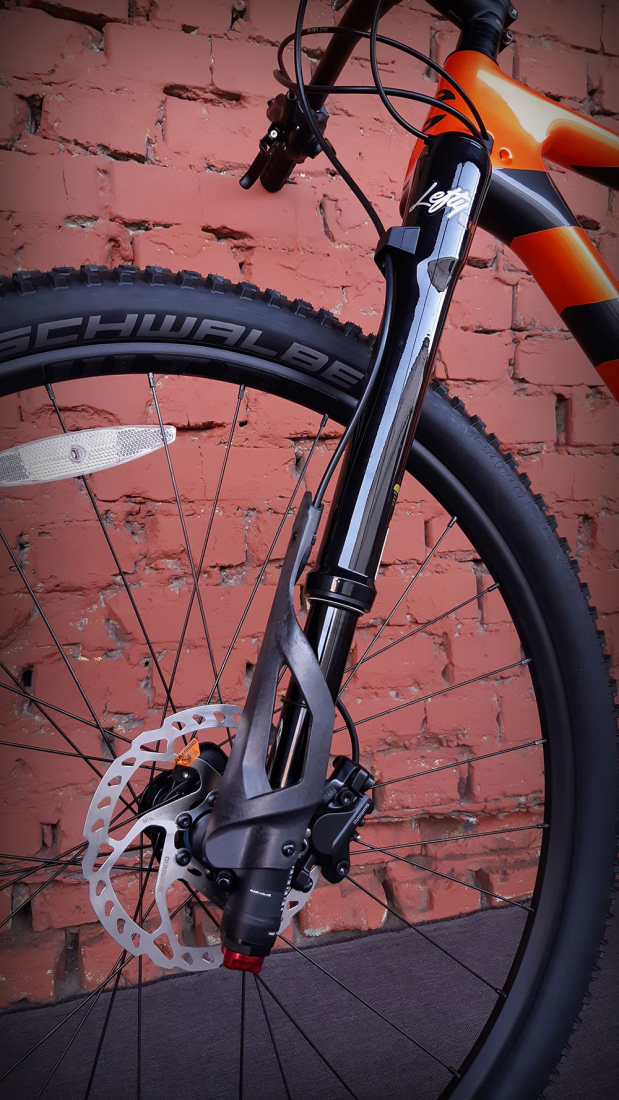
Lefty

A Single-legged suspension fork introduced in the early 200s, using needle-bearing cages inside triangular tubes rather than conventional telescoping bushings, intended to reduce friction and rotational play while saving weight. Later Variants include the Lefty Ocho (mountain bike-focused) and Lefty Oliver (gravel-focused).

==== Hollowgram and BB30 ====
Cannondale introduced its proprietary Hollowgram crankset and bottom-bracket system in 2001, using a two-piece hollow aluminum crank arm bonded with aluminum adhesive and a hollow, oversized aluminum spindle; Cannondale stated the system weighed about 80 grams less and was roughly 10% stiffer than Shimano's contemporary Dura-Ace FC-7800 crankset, while remaining compatible with standard 68mm English-threaded bottom bracket shells via an adapter. Cannondale later released the underlying spindle-and-shell dimensions as an open, royalty-free standard called BB30, subsequently adopted across the industry. BB30 increases the bottom-bracket spindle diameter from a traditional 24mm to 30mm and the bottom-bracket shell's inside diameter to 42mm, allowing the use of lighter aluminum spindle in place of steel and increasing stiffness in both the frame and crankset; it also replaces threaded cartridge or cup bearings with bearings pressed directly into the frame, saving further weight but requiring tighter manufacturing tolerances and making the bottom bracket more difficult to service than threaded designs.

Headshok on Mavaro Neo

==== Early Adoption of External-Bearing Cranksets ====
Cannondale was among the first manufacturers to produce a crankset using externally mounted bottom-bracket bearings, a design it later discontinued in its original form; external-bearing bottom brackets subsequently became the industry standard approach for mid-range and higher-end bicycles generally.

==== Headshok and the OnePointFive Standard ====
In 1992, Cannondale introduced the Headshok integrated suspension fork system (see also Delta V, under Notable Mountain BIkes) together with an oversized head tube to accommodate it. In 2001, the industry-wide "OnePointFive" (1.5-inch) headset standard emerged using headtube dimensions similar to Cannondale's original Headshok design.

==== Kingpin Suspension ====
Kingpin Suspension on a Cannondale Topstone

Introduced in 2019 on the Topstone gravel bike, Kingpin is a low-maintenance micro-suspension system using a pivot at the seat tube to provide limited rear-end compliance without a traditional rear shock.

==== SmartSense ====
An integrated electronic rider-visibility system combining bike-mounted lights, rear-facing radar, and a companion smartphone app, first introduced in 2022 on the Synapse Carbon as Cannondale's answer to riders wanting integrated safety electronics without a tangle of separate accessories. The first generation used a Garmin-branded radar unit (compatible with third-party head units including Wahoo, since Garmin Varia radar broadly supports other display brands) and offered several configurations combining radar, lights, and electronic shifting power from one down-tube-mounted battery; Cannondale said the Topstone Carbon gravel bike would be the next model to receive the system with plans to extend it more broadly across the road lineup.

The system was substantially reworked as "SmarSense Gen 2" with the redesigned Synapse launched in May 2025, integrating the rear light and radar into a single unit, moving the battery into a hatch inside the down tube for a cleaner appearance, shrinking and brightening the lights, and making radar standard equipment on every SmarSense-equipped bike rather than an option. The second-generation system uses a specific component set - a SmartSense LightSkin U1E headlight (up to 800 lumens, variable output), a Garmin Varia eRTL 615 rear radar/taillight, and a 43.2Wh removable internal battery with a built-in flashlight function - communicating over Bluetooth and ANT+, and is engineered so that electronic shifting continues to function even after the battery can no longer power the lights, with Cannondale stating that a battery at 5% remaining charge still holds roughly the same usable capacity as a standard SRAM AXS derailleur-mounted battery. The redesigned system was named to TIME Magazine's Best Inventions list for 2025 and received a Design & Innovation Award the same year. A trade-off noted by independent reviewers is reduced flexibility from the fixed integration: a SmartSense-equipped bike cannot simply have its lights, radar, or battery removed for a ride, since the drivetrain's electronic shifting depends on the same central battery.

== Sponsorships ==
=== Road racing ===
==== Saeco, 1996–2004 ====
Cannondale's sponsorship of Division 1 road racing teams began with the Saeco team in the late 1990s, highlighted by Mario Cipollini's four consecutive stage wins in the 1999 Tour de France. The team notably won the Giro d'Italia five times, in 1997 with Ivan Gotti, in 2003 with Gilberto Simoni in 2004 with Damiano Cunego. Saeco became Lampre–Caffita in 2005, and the relationship with Cannondale was severed.

==== Barloworld, 2006–2007 ====
Cannondale was the bicycle sponsor of UCI Professional Continental team Barloworld.

==== Liquigas, 2007–2012 ====
In 2007, Cannondale became the bicycle sponsor to Liquigas, replacing Bianchi, and counted fourth and fifth Giro wins as Danilo Di Luca in 2007 and Ivan Basso in 2010 rode to victory. In 2011, they became a title sponsor under the name Liquigas–Cannondale.

==== Bahati Foundation Pro Cycling Team, 2010 ====
Cannondale was the bicycle sponsor UCI Continental team Bahati Foundation in 2010.

==== Cannondale Pro Cycling, 2013–2014 ====
In 2013, Cannondale took over the title sponsorship of the Liquigas team.

==== Partnership with EF Education ====
Richard Carapaz riding for EF Education in the 2026 Tour De France

Since 2018, Cannondale has been the exclusive bicycle sponsor of the EF-Education-backed WorldTour team, a relationship that began when the education company EF Education First became the team's primary title sponsor following Cannondale's own 2015 merger of its former Cannondale Pro Cycling team in the Colorado-based Slipstream Sports organization). The partnership has continued through several subsequent title-sponsor changes - including EF Education First Pro Cycling, EF Pro Cycling, EF Education-Nippo, and the team's current name, EF Education-EasyPost - with Cannondale remaining the constant bicycle supplier throughout. Cannondale has described the relationship as extending beyond traditional road racing into gravel and off-road events, supplying bikes for the team's expanded calendar at races such as Unbound Gravel and Leadville, and the team's riders have used Cannondale's SuperSix EVO, System Six, and SuperSlice models in Competition. The partnership was extended to the women's side of the sport with the 2023 founding of a companion women's team, now racing as EF Education-Oatly, which also rides Cannondale equipment.

==== Tibco-Silicon Valley Bank, 2020–2021 ====
In 2020, Cannondale became the bike sponsor of the Tibco–Silicon Valley Bank UCI Women's World Tour team.

=== Mountain biking ===
==== Volvo Cannondale Mountain Bike Racing Team, 1994–2002 ====
The Volvo Cannondale Mountain Bike Racing Team was one of the most successful elite professional racing teams in the history of mountain biking. Over the 9 season, Volvo Cannondale racers won 11 gold medals, 3 silver medals and 2 bronze medals at world championships, as well as one silver and once bronze medal at Olympic Games, and one bronze medal at European championships.

Cross-country riders: Alison Sydor (1994–1999), Tinker Juarez (1994–2002), Sara Ellis (1994–1996), Marc Gullickson (1994–1995), Cyrille Bonnand (1996–1997), Annabella Stropparo (1996–2000), Cadel Evans (1998–2001), Christoph Sauser (1999–2002)

Downhill riders: Franck Roman (1994–1996), Missy Giove (1994–1998), Myles Rockwell (1994–1998), Kenichi Nabeshima (1995–1997), Kim Sonier (1996–1998), Oscar Saiz (1997–1998), Brigitta Kasper (1998), David Vasquez-Lopez (1998), Anne-Caroline Chausson (1999–2002), Cédric Gracia (1999–2002), Brian Lopes (1999–2000)

Trial athletes: Libor Karas (1994–?), Martyn Ashton (1997), Lance Trappe

==== SoBe Cannondale 1998–2003 ====
The SoBe Cannondale team was an amateur and professional racing team in the USA.

==== Siemens mobile Cannondale, 2003–2005 ====
Siemens mobile and Cannondale contracted the austrian racing team Rainer-Wurz.com, co-owned by formula one racer Alexander Wurz to form the successor of the Volvo Cannondale team.

Cross-country riders: Christoph Sauser (2003–2005), Roel Paulissen (2003–2004), Hannes Pallhuber (2003), Franz Hofer (2003) Tinker Juarez (2003)

Downhill, 4-Cross: Cédric Gracia (2003), Petra Bernhard (2003)

==== Cannondale Vredestein, 2006–2008 ====
Kashi Leuchs (XC, 2006–2008), Fredrik Kessiakoff (XC, 2006–2007), Peter Riis Andersen (XC, 2006), Jakob Fuglsang (XC, 2006–2008), Roel Paulissen (XC, 2007–2008), Jelmer Jubbega (XC 2007).

==== Bear Naked Cannondale 2007 ====
The Bear Naked Cannondale team was the successor of the SoBe Cannondale team.

==== Cannondale Factory Racing, since 2009 ====
Roel Paulissen (XC, 2009–2010), Marco Fontana (XC, 2009–2017), Martin Gujan (XC, 2009–2012), Manuel Fumic (XC, 2010-today). In mid-2026 Cannondale announced that the 2026 season would be the final year for its dedicated cross-country mountain bike World Cup team, ending an elite MTB racing program dating back to the early 1990s. The brand said it would replace the traditional factory team with a broader "Cannondale Rogues" program beginning in 2027, combining professional racers with content creators and community ambassadors across multiple disciplines.

==== MonaVie Cannondale ====
Tinker Juarez

==== Individual sponsorships ====
Aaron Chase (1997–2014), Jerome Clementz (enduro, 2009–2020), Chris Van Dine (DH, 2006–?), Albertus Jooste (2019)

=== Triathlon ===
In triathlon racing, Cannondale has sponsored 2005 Ironman world champion Faris Al-Sultan, Dejan Patrčević, Croatian triathlon champion, as well as three time Ironman world champion Chrissie Wellington, Sarah Reinertsen, the first amputee woman to finish the Ironman Triathlon, 2004 Paralympics 200 IM gold medalist Rudy Garcia-Tolson.

== See also ==
- Klein Bikes
