= Baby on board =

Type of caution sign

"Baby on board" is a caution sign to alert others either to the possible presence of a baby inside a vehicle, or to a woman's pregnancy.

== Inside a vehicle ==
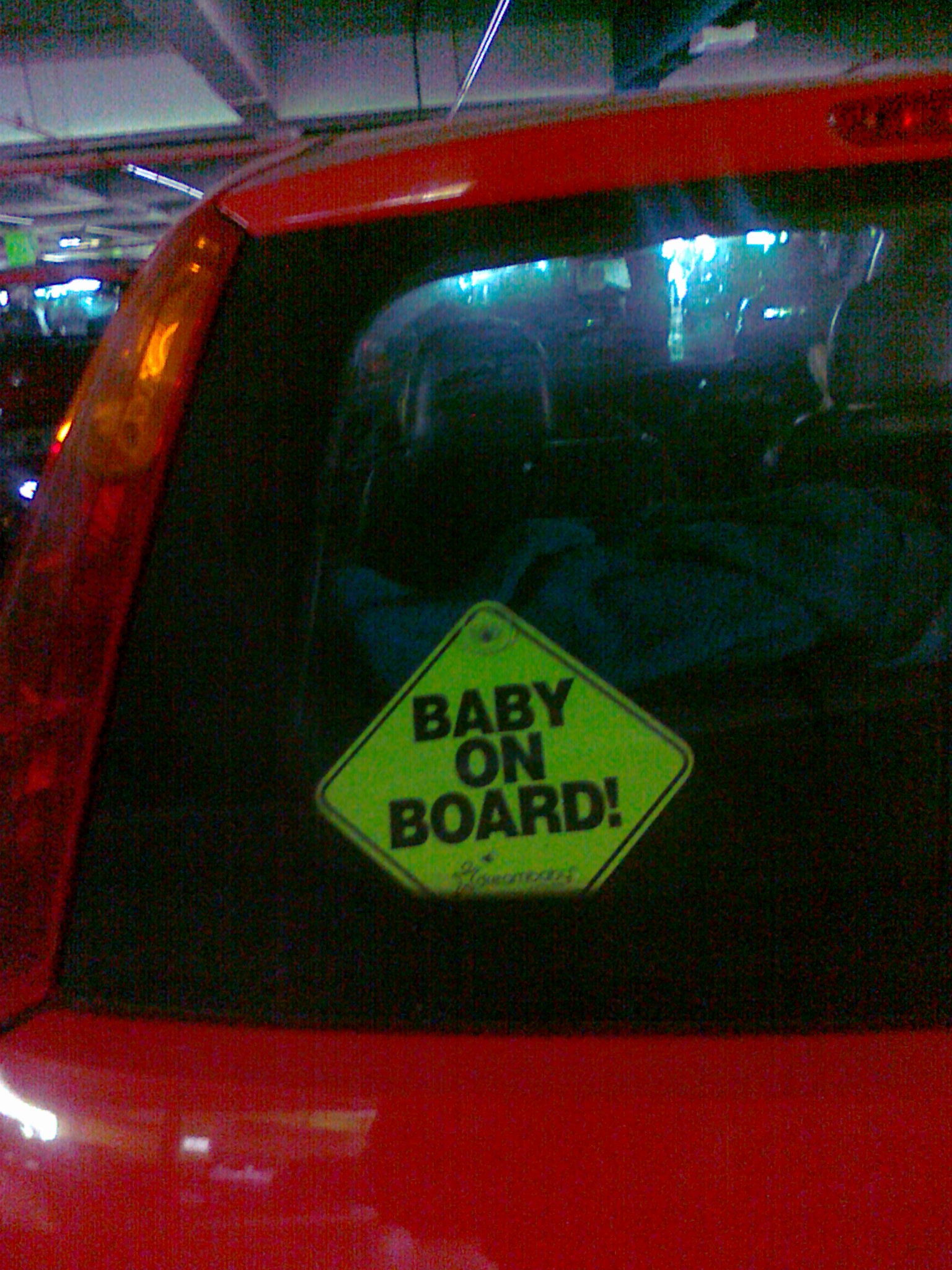
Baby on board sign in car

It can be the message of a small (usually 12 centimetres or 5 inches) sign intended to be placed in the back window of an automobile to caution other drivers that an infant is travelling in the automobile.

The sign may also be intended as a warning to emergency personnel, in case of emergency, that there may be a baby in the vehicle. However, this is not the intended purpose as stated by the company Safety 1st, which marketed the product at the time of its peak popularity.

A version of the sign was found in Germany by Patricia Bradley of Medford, Massachusetts. With her sister Helen she started a company, PHOB, to market them in the US, but had only limited success until partnering with Michael Lerner.

Lerner was told about the signs after recounting his experience of aggressive drivers when driving his baby nephew home in busy traffic. An urban legend claims that the death of a baby led to the creation of the signs, but there is no truth to this claim. Lerner eventually bought PHOB for approximately US$150,000, and changed the name to "Safety 1st". The company later diversified into infant and child care products and is now part of Dorel Industries.

The sign became ubiquitous in the US in 1985, but its use rapidly declined in 1986 as parody imitations with lines like "Baby I'm Bored", "Pit Bull on board", and "Mother-In-Law in Trunk" became popular.

Its popularity continues well into the 21st century in the United Kingdom (along with other versions such as "Princess on board" and "Little Person on board"), in Italy, and in Japan (usually saying "Baby in Car", with the sign written either in Latin script, or in Japanese katakana as ベイビー イン カー Beibī in kā).

In addition to traditional window-mounted signs, some modern variations include reusable hanging designs placed inside the vehicle, intended to improve visibility and flexibility.

== Pregnancy alert sign ==
Following popular request and trials in 2005, Transport for London (TfL) began issuing badges displaying the TfL logo and the words "Baby on board!" to pregnant women travelling on the London Underground, to help other passengers identify pregnant travellers who might like to be offered a seat. TfL supplies free of charge one "Baby on board" badge per person. The effectiveness of this badge is mixed.

Today, similar badges are available from retailers, and from many other public transport operators in the UK and the Republic of Ireland.
