= George Huffman =

US businessman

George Phillips Huffman
- Born: September 6, 1862; Dayton, Ohio, US
- Died: December 31, 1897 (aged 35)
- Known for: Founder of Huffy Bicycle Company

George Phillips Huffman (September 6, 1862 – December 31, 1897) was an American businessman. His Davis Sewing Machine Company, which began producing bicycles in the late 19th century, was the precursor to the Huffman Manufacturing Company (later became the Huffy Corporation), a manufacturer of bicycles.

== Early career ==
Huffman was born September 6, 1862, in Dayton, Ohio. He was educated at the Cooper Academy and then studied law in the offices of Gunckel & Rowe. He worked in real estate and in 1887 he purchased the Kratochwill Flouring Mills and the Kratochwill Milling Company. He was also president of the National Improvement Company, the Monitor Publishing Company, and the Miami Valley Elevator Company. He served as vice-president of the Crume & Sefton Manufacturing Company and treasurer of the Cooper hydraulic Company. He was a director in the Third National Bank, the Homestead Aid Association, the Consolidated Coal and Coke Company of Cincinnati, and YMCA locally. On October 30, 1884, he married Maude C. McKee. They had two children, Horace Huffman and George P. Huffman Jr.

== Bicycles ==
In 1887, Huffman purchased the Davis Sewing Machine Company in Watertown, New York, which manufactured high-quality sewing machines. The following year, Huffman moved the factory to larger facilities in Dayton, Ohio. While continuing to manufacture sewing machines, in 1892 Huffman adapted the factory to produce bicycles.

George P. Huffman died December 31, 1897, of a brain hemorrhage and was interred in the Woodland Cemetery, Dayton, Ohio.
