= Motorcycle accessories =

Accessories to enhance motorcycle safety, performance or comfort

Motorcycle accessories are features and accessories selected by a motorcycle owner to enhance safety, performance, or comfort, and may include anything from mobile electronics to sidecars and trailers. An accessory may be added at the factory by the original equipment manufacturer or purchased and installed by the owner post-sale as aftermarket goods. The term Farkle (a portmanteau of the words functional and sparkle) is used within the motorcycle community, originally to denote useful add-ons, such as GPS or other upgraded components. Now also used at times in a humorous or mildly derogatory way to describe bling, such as anodized or chromed parts that add no functionality.

== Fairing ==
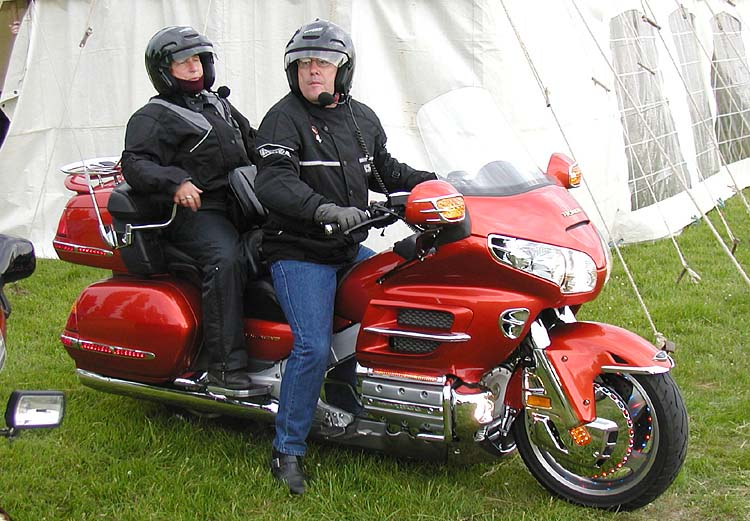
Touring fairing on a Honda Gold Wing

The most prominent of the plastic or fibreglass shells covering parts of the motorcycle is the "fairing". In practice, this may blend almost seamlessly with engine panels or wheel covers/mudguards (which in some cases will be painted or plated metal). These systems act to protect the rider from some or all of the weather, may improve aerodynamics (reducing drag), and are an important styling element.

Modern fairings, mostly designed specifically for each motorcycle and fitted as original equipment by the manufacturer, have eliminated the aerodynamic and structural failings of early add-on fairings. Both sports and tourer versions improve (sometimes very considerably) the rider's comfort in cold and wet weather and even "bikini" versions protect the vulnerable crotch region from water ingress.

== Windscreen ==
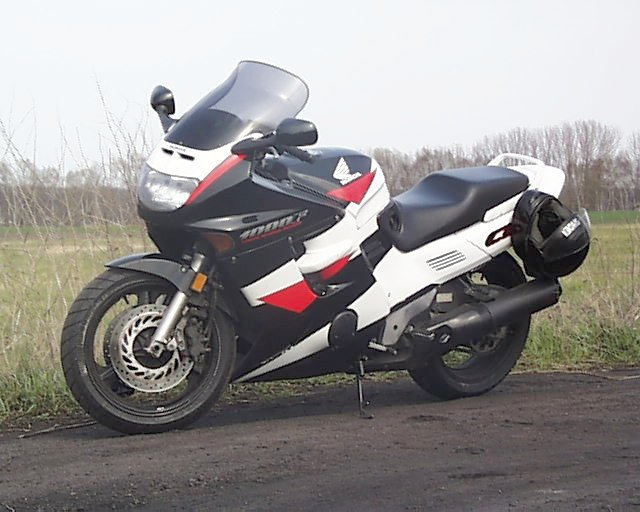
Aerodynamic sports fairing on a Honda CBR1000F

Also called windshields or screens, windscreens can be built into a fairing or be attached to an otherwise unfaired bike. They are usually made from transparent high-impact polycarbonate or acrylic plastic. They may be shaped specifically to direct air flow over or around the head of the rider even if they are much shorter than the seated rider. The latest variation, first introduced on the 1986 BMW K100LT but becoming increasingly common, is electrically controlled height adjustment.

== Heating ==
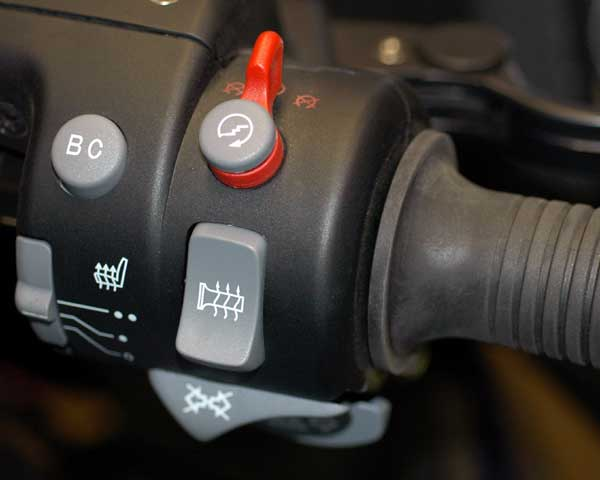
Heated handgrips and saddle controls on a BMW

Since motorcycles lack climate control or full protection from the wind, some manufacturers offer heated seats or hand grips to relieve the discomfort of low temperatures experienced during night riding or the colder months. They can also be added on as aftermarket accessories and are powered by the bike's electrical system.

Some touring motorcycles, such as the Honda Gold Wing, have louvred vents in the fairing which redirect warm air from around the engine or exhaust toward the rider. These motorcycles may also feature vents for cooling the rider.

== Sidecar ==
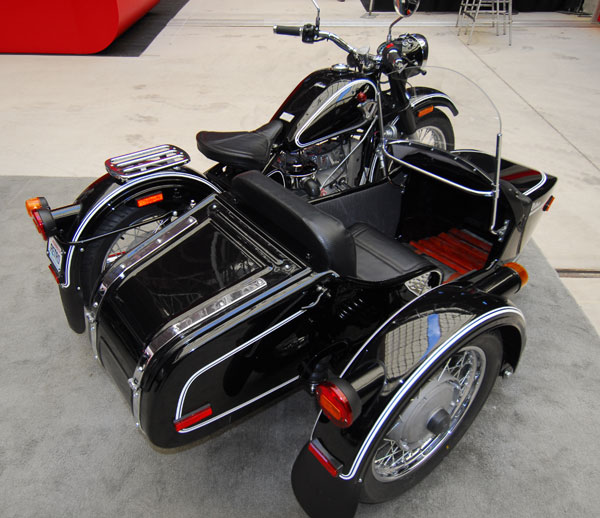
IMZ-Ural motorcycle with a "sports" sidecar

A sidecar turns a motorcycle into a three-wheeled vehicle. Their peak popularity (160,000 in the UK in 1955, pre-World War II in the United States) came about when powerful motorcycles were available, but there were relatively few cars about. Sidecars such as the British Watsonian were coach-built in wood and had doors, sliding windows and even a sun-roof, but modern sidecars may be fibreglass or aluminium. Alignment of the sidecar is critical and the mountings come under considerable stress, making a quickly-detachable version largely impractical. In any case, the special sidecar tyres are poorly-suited to solo riding.

The cornering of "an outfit" is partly controlled by the throttle and this makes for interesting effects: A sidecar wheel brake — usually a pedal side-by-side with the motorcycle rear brake — helps considerably. Sidecars place a heavy strain on wheel bearings, wheel-spokes and suspension components; even frames and engines may suffer. A banking false-sidecar known as the "Sidewinder" became available in the UK in the 1980s, intended to overcome learner-driver licensing requirement restrictions of 125 cc introduced in 1983, but its carrying capacity was restricted, being approximately equivalent to a tool box.

== Trailer and tow hitch ==
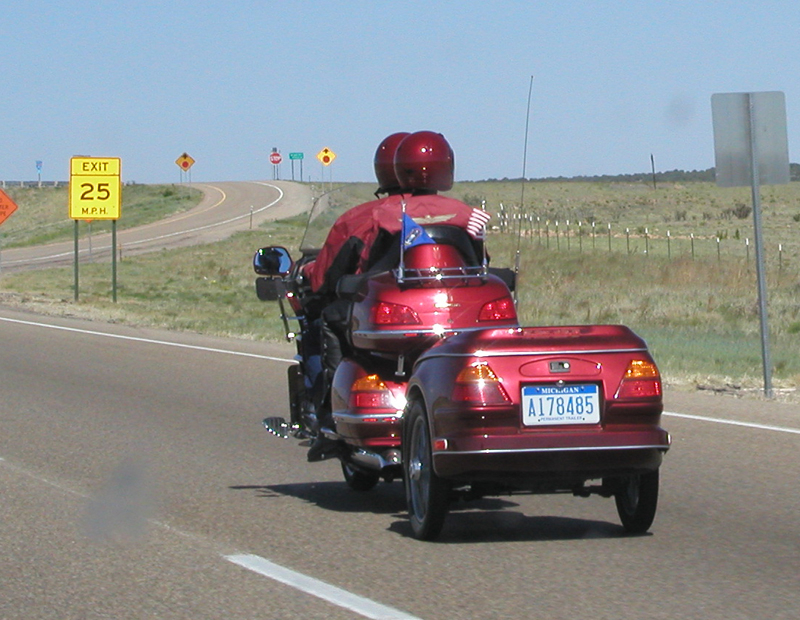
A trailer being towed by a motorcycle

A trailer hitch or tow hitch is a device mounted on a motorcycle that enables it to tow a motorcycle trailer. Legislation often restricts them to carrying baggage and not passengers.

== Hitch carrier ==
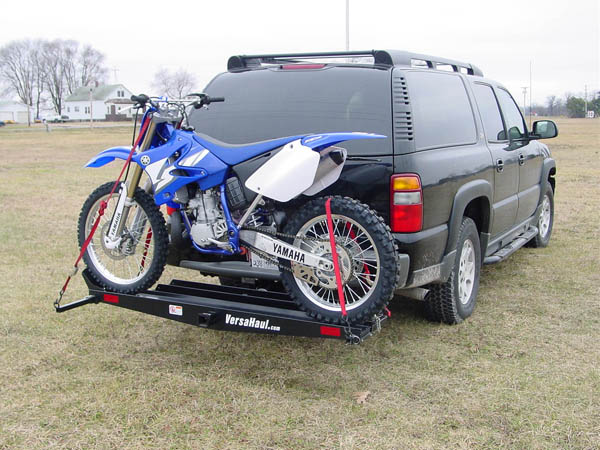
A Bike mounted on the back of a car with Motorcycle Hitch Carrier

Car or truck carriers, usually for lighter motorcycles, can mount in the vehicle's draw bar receiver, in place of some types of detachable tow hitches.

== Storage ==
Various options exist to transport items, other than the riders and passenger, on a motorcycle.

=== Panniers (saddlebags) ===
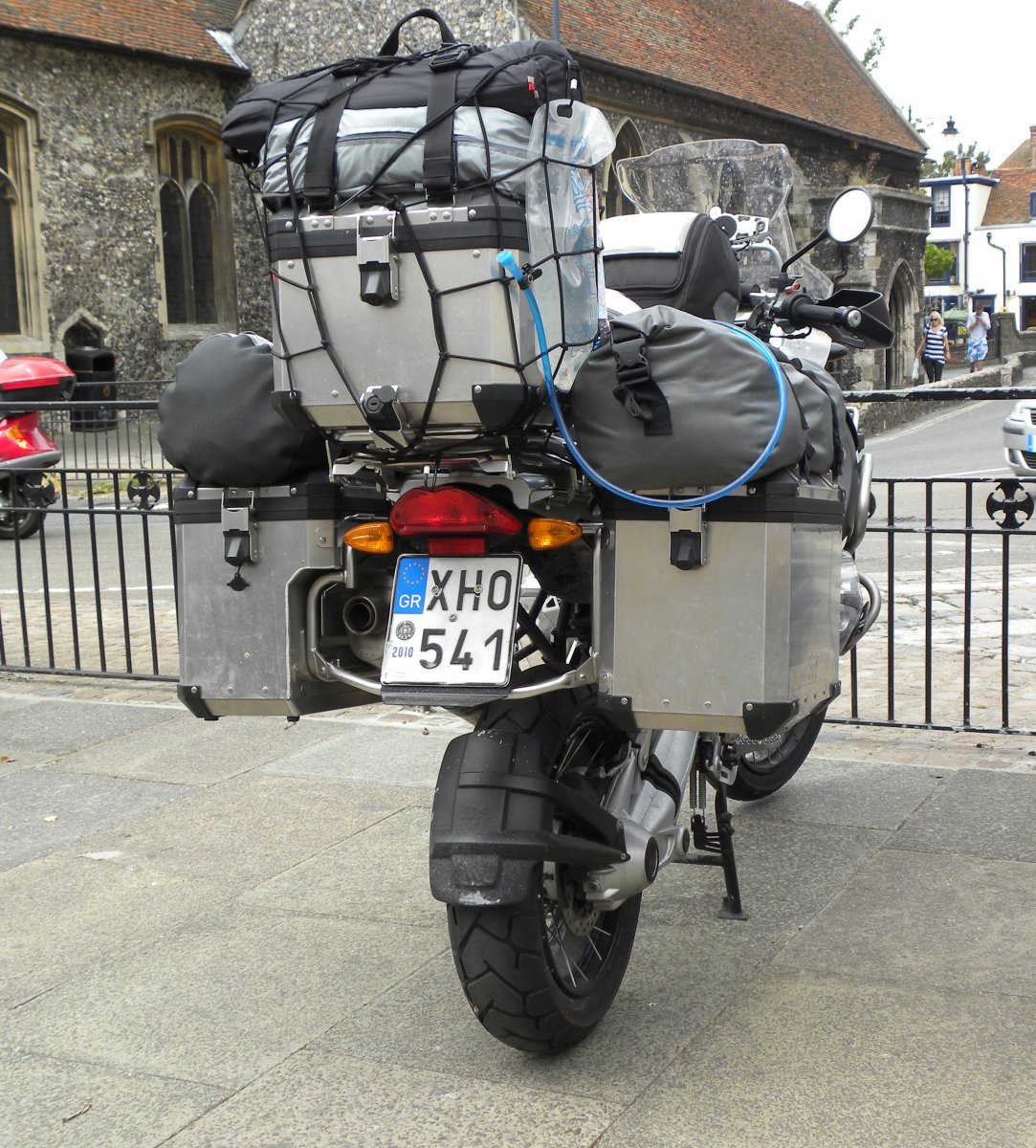
Panniers and topbox fitted to a BMW R1200GS Adventure

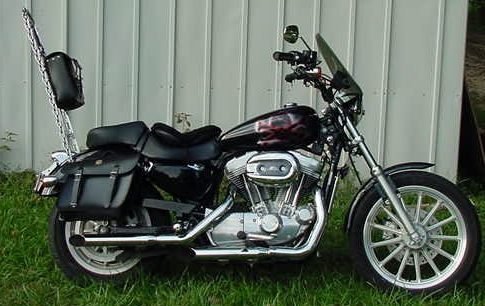
XL Series III throwover saddlebags on 2005 Harley Sportster

Modern touring motorcycles often have panniers or saddlebags fitted as standard or available as options. They normally come in pairs but may be used individually.

Panniers mount on either side of the rear of the motorcycle roughly underneath (but not interfering with) the seating position of the pillion passenger. "Hard" panniers commonly come in an injection molded plastic such as ABS, and "soft" panniers come in some form of textile (e.g. Cordura) or leather. Panniers are nearly always detachable and often lockable, both of their mountings and their closure. Suitcase-like panniers, side-loading, are ideal for carrying clothing into hotel rooms while top-loading hard panniers are more suitable for shopping trips.

Utility top-loading soft panniers may come in a "throw-over" form without mountings. They can be firmly located by the yoke portion under the rider or pillion or may simply be loose. Increasingly, the bag portion is attached to the yoke with zips, making their use as luggage more convenient.

=== Trunk ===
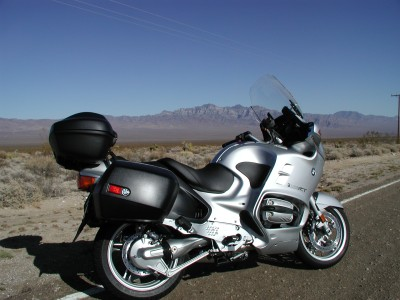
Motorcycle with a removable trunk

A trunk or top-box is a storage compartment fitted behind the seat, often complementing panniers or saddlebags. Original equipment versions may be removable or an integral part of the bike e.g. as fitted to the Honda Goldwing or BMW K1200LT, and may be fitted with the motorcycle rear lights, and a backrest for a passenger. The top box may also be an aftermarket fitment.

Trunk may also refer to the under-seat storage space built into a motorcycle or scooter.

=== Luggage rack ===
A common addition to many bikes is an attachment onto which bags or other luggage can be fastened. This removes the need for rider backpacks and is generally a more secure and safer way to add carrying capacity to a motorcycle. In the 1950s the popular British motorcycle Triumph often came with a tank-mounted carrier. Load-security was better, but they lost popularity over the unproven, but keenly felt, danger to the rider in the event of a front-end collision.

=== Tank and tail bags ===
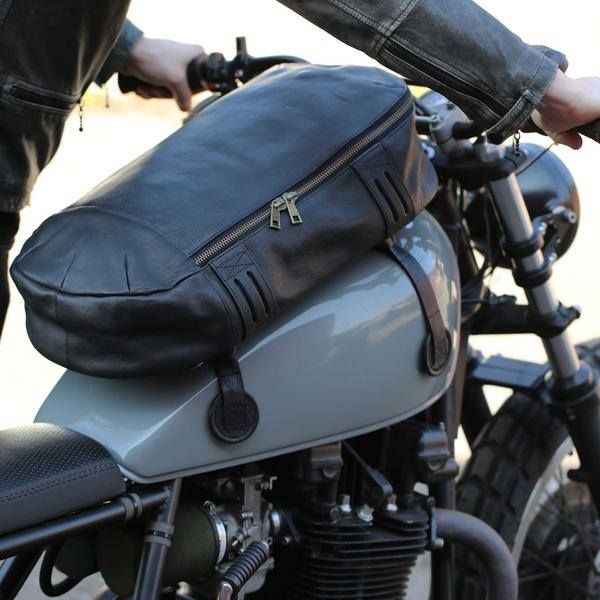
A tank bag held to the gas tank with magnetic fasteners

A tank bag is a storage compartment attached to the top of the gas tank. Many mounting options exist, with straps and/or magnets being the most common. Other options include rigid collars that bolt to the tank around the fuel filler cap, a large pad fastened to the gas tank which serves as a mounting point for the bag using zippers or straps, and suction cups. Most tank bags are designed to be quickly removed to facilitate refueling.

Tail bags are typically soft bags mounted over the pillion seat via straps, and are available in various sizes. Due to the mounting location, a motorcycle with a tail bag cannot also carry a passenger on the pillion seat.

== Crash damage protection ==
=== Sliders ===
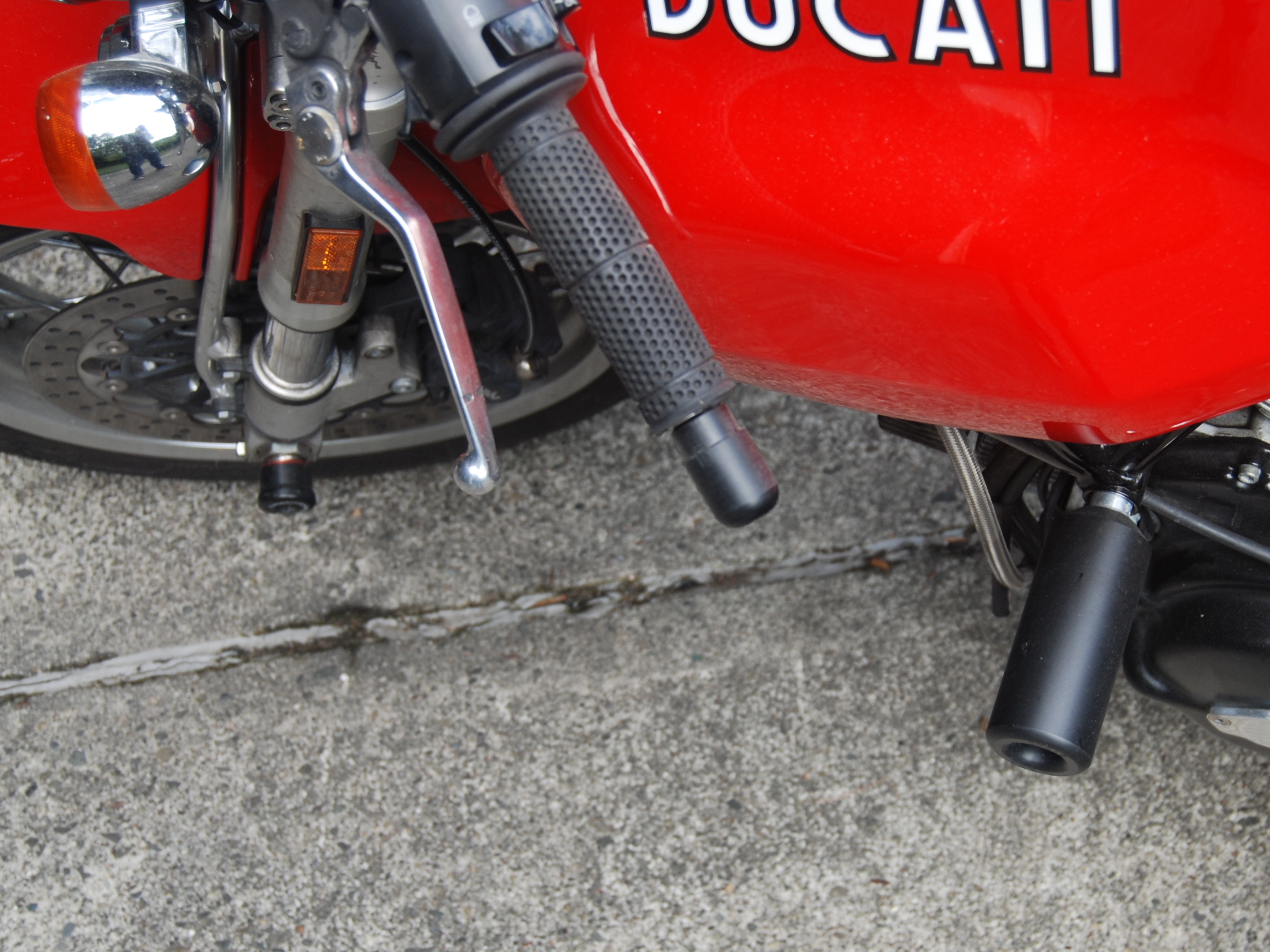
A motorcycle with sliders protecting the fork, the handle bar ends, and the frame

Purpose-designed devices, called frame sliders, frame protectors, fairing protectors, or crash bobbins, are attached to motorcycles with the intention of minimizing damage to the bike's fairings, frame, engine, and other parts, in the event of a crash, or an accidental tip over. They are made of plastics, such as Delrin, acetal, or nylon, or sometimes aluminum. Frame sliders are usually located and installed on the engine bolts on both sides of the fairings. Front or rear axle sliders, also called fork sliders and swing-arm spool sliders provide some potential damage reduction for the suspension components, wheels, and other parts by making contact with the ground before the rest of the bike. Hard-mounted foot pegs, which do not fold upward can also serve as a buffer between the ground and the bike's frame and components.

=== Crash bar ===
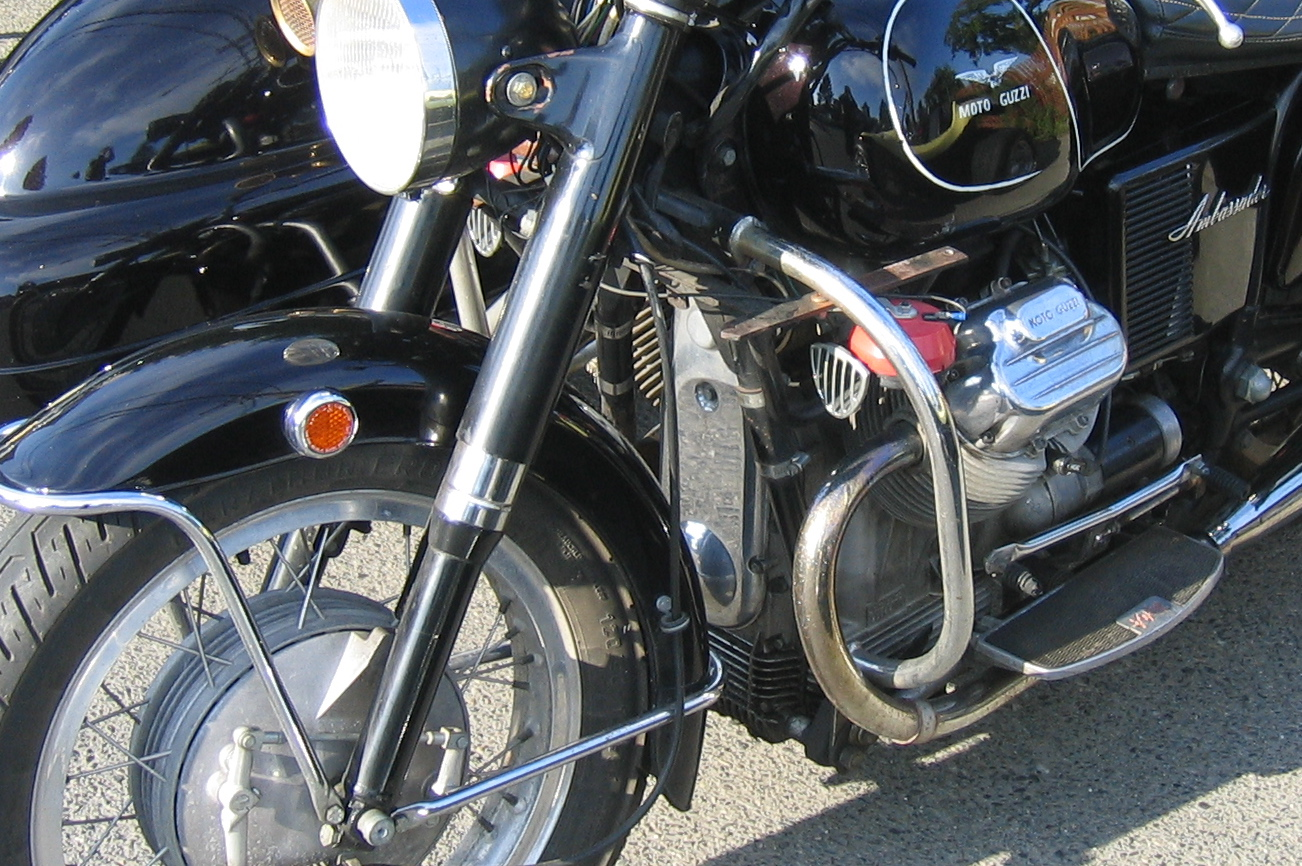
A Moto Guzzi Ambassador sidecar rig with a crash bar.

Crash bars aim to protect motorcycle engines and body panels and are believed to protect the rider. The Hurt Report (1981) found that "Crash bars are not an effective injury countermeasure; the reduction of injury to the ankle-foot is balanced by increase of injury to the thigh-upper leg, knee, and lower leg".

They are less popular now than they used to be; vulnerable engines and fairings are sometimes protected by frame sliders instead.

A common arrangement of crash bar is a loop of chrome-plated steel tubing mounted each side of a motorcycle's lower frame. As well as their supposed protective function, they are valuable as a mount point for accessories like highway pegs, lights and, on police motorcycles, sirens, cameras and radar guns. One variation is the sump-guard, primarily for off-road riding.

== Custom tires ==
Specialized tires based on the purpose of the bike are common. Bikes meant for drag racing will have fatter, thicker tires, cross country bikes will often have whitewalls or lettering on their tires, and high end bikes will often have custom spokes as well - this can vary in quantity of spokes as well as the spoke material, plating or coating. Common materials include steel and stainless steel. Plating can include chrome, nickel and others, and powder coating allows any custom color desired. Snow tires for motorcycles provide better handling in snowy conditions. Motorcycles raced on ice have studs protruding from the tread to supply the necessary traction for racing.

== Aftermarket accessories ==
Some aftermarket companies sell custom made parts for motorcycles, the most common are:

- winglets (usually found on sport bikes and streetfighters)
- aftermarket front fenders
- flat number plates (usually found on dirt bikes and supermoto)
- belly fairings (usually found on sport and naked bikes)
- full fairing kits (made for naked and sport bikes)
- clip-on handlebars
- LED lights
- air filters
- handguards
- adjustable suspension
- aftermarket exhaust
- aftermarket rims
- handlegrips
- aftermarket mirrors
- seat cover
- aftermarket plate holder
- mobile electronics

== See also ==
- Outline of motorcycles and motorcycling
- Motorcycle bell
