= Stelber Cycle Corp =

Bicycle manufacturer

Stelber Cycle Corp was a manufacturer of bicycles located in New York City. It was granted a patent for a bicycle stabilizer in 1952. It offered cruiser bicycles in the 1950s and several models during the 1960s in the wheelie bike style designed by George Barris under the Iverson brand name. The Iverson Dragstripper is popular for conversion to the lowrider bicycle style. In the 1970s, Stelbler offered an electric tricycle that it claimed could travel 50 miles on a charge at speeds of up to 15 miles per hour.
