= Raleigh Chopper =

Children's bicycle

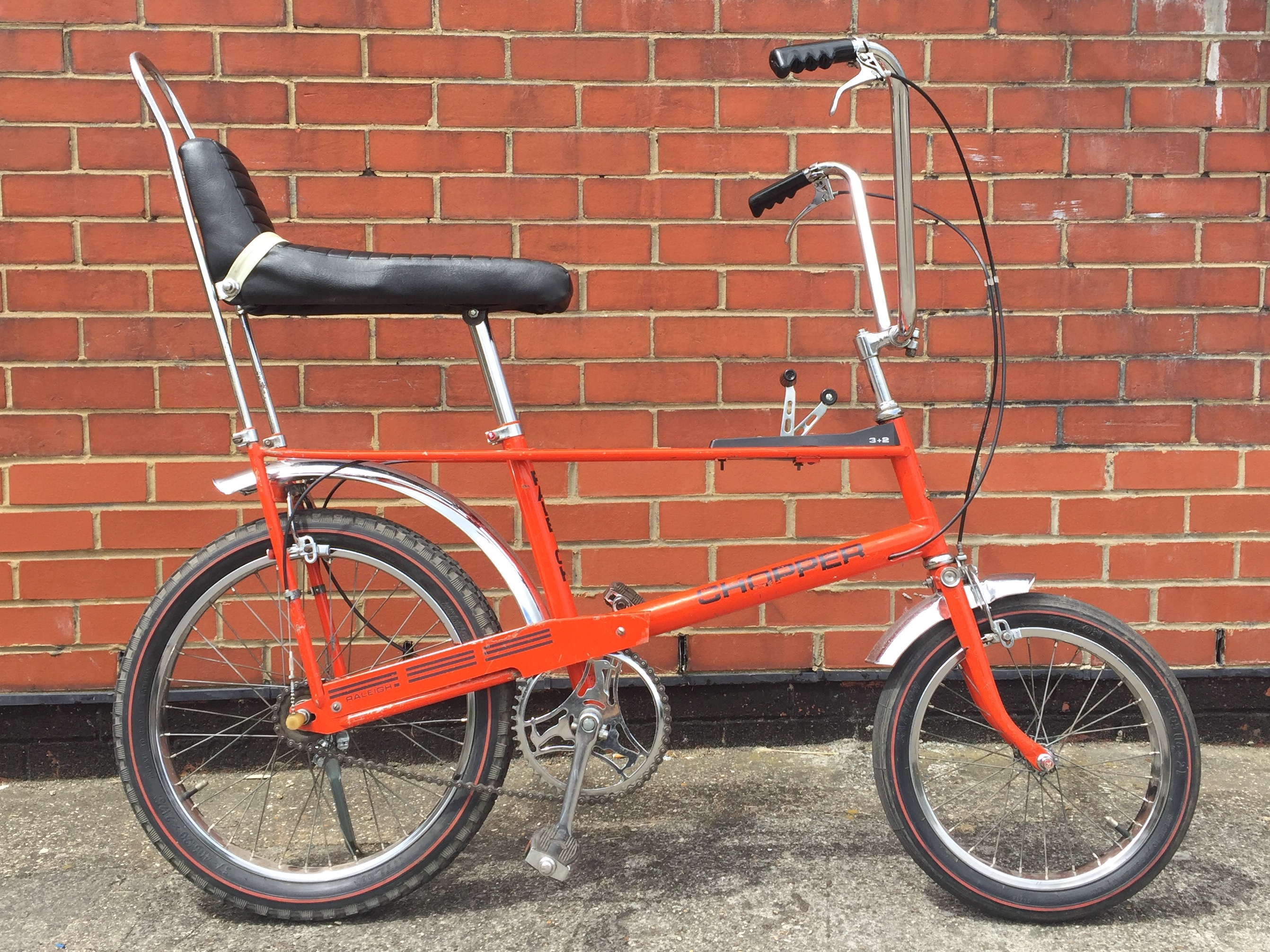
1969 Raleigh Chopper

The Raleigh Chopper is a bicycle for children and young adults, manufactured and marketed by the Raleigh Bicycle Company of Nottingham, England. It became a cultural icon, and its design was influenced by "chopped" motorcycles which had themselves evolved from and caricatured American Dirt track racing motorcycles. Early chopper style motorcycles were featured in the 1953 film The Wild One and in the film Easy Rider which was released in 1969 at the height of the chopper motorbike craze. MK1 models were produced from 1968 to 1972, MK2 models were produced from 1972 to 1983 and MK3 models were produced from 2004 to 2012 and sold through to 2018.

== Design ==
The Raleigh Chopper design has been subject of debate but only since 1996, with claims by Alan Oakley (1927–2012) chief designer for Raleigh and then more than 30 yrs later, from Tom Karen of OGLE Design.

Alan Oakley's archive was sold in 2018 (Mellor & Kirk Auctioneers, Nottingham, August 2018) and contains material relating to the debate over the Raleigh Chopper's design that had not previously been available to the public. During his research visit to America, Oakley had seen the Wheelie bike designs which had been popular there since the mid 1960s, many of these featured the same high rise handlebars, long banana seat supported on rear struts and other features which were copied on the raleigh chopper. One unique design feature of the raleigh chopper design was the frame bottom bracket arrangement which can be seen in Alan Oakleys archive envelope sketch.

Some facts relating to the raleigh chopper design can be found in US patent USD213606 from June 7 1968 which names John McGegor Gordon and Harry Letherland of Raleigh Industries Ltd as inventors of the chopper frame design. Thomas Karen of Raleigh Industries Ltd is named in US patent USD214980 as inventor of the chopper seat.

The Raleigh Chopper was the bike that rescued Raleigh from administration with huge global sales from a total production run including Mk1 Mk2 Mk3 models which ran from 1968 to 1983 (MK1 & MK2) and then 2004 to 2012 (mk3).

The Chopper featured in numerous TV series and movies throughout the 1970s and 1980s, including Back to the Future. Until the BMX came along in the mid-1980s, the Chopper outsold other bikes by 6 to 1.

In 2014 a 1980 MK2 Raleigh Chopper gifted to US President Ronald Reagan sold at auction for a record $35,000.

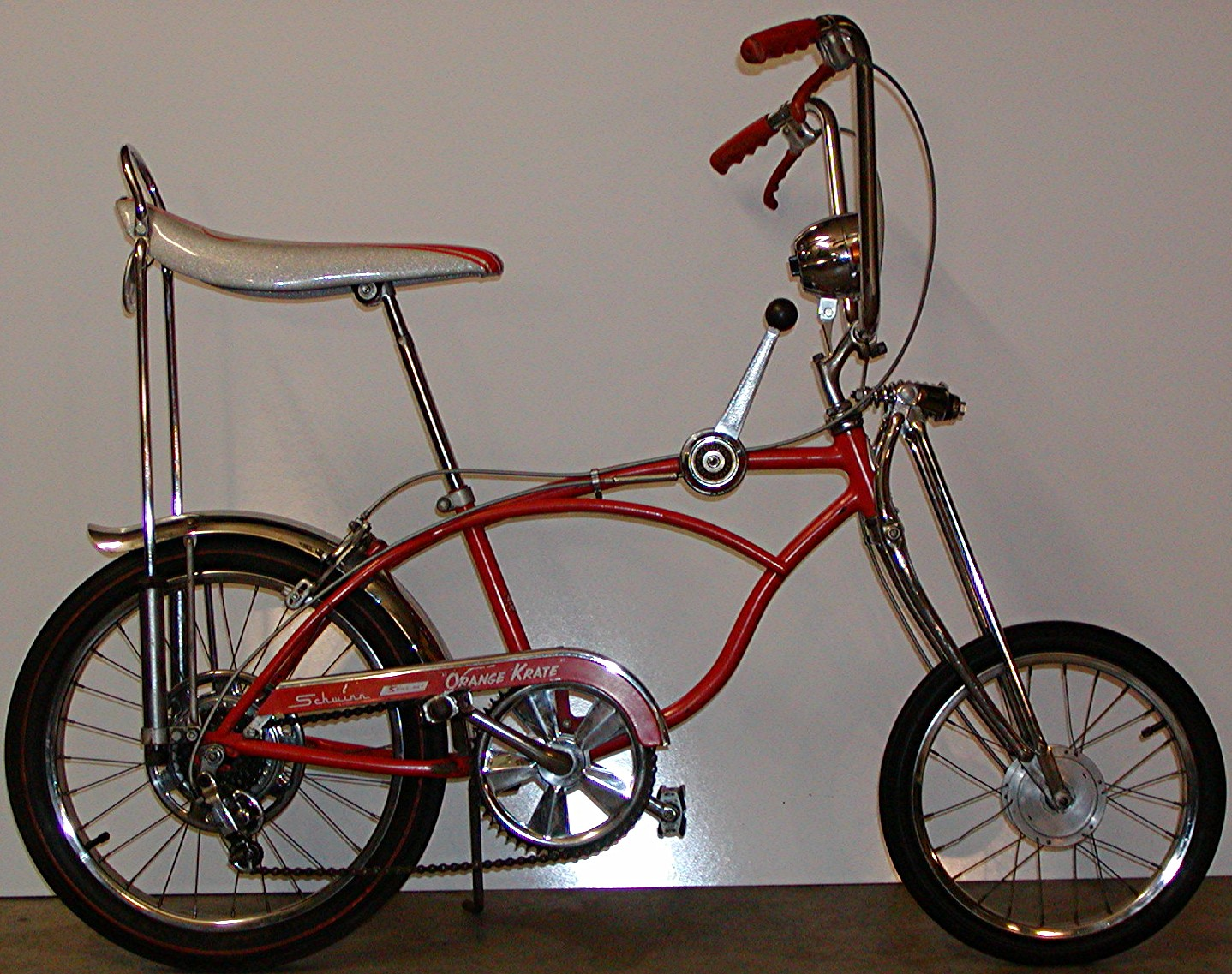
A Schwinn Sting-Ray, wheelie bike released 5 years prior to the Raleigh Chopper, this example from 1968

The Chopper was designed in response to the Schwinn Sting-Ray, and an earlier attempt, the Rodeo, which was not commercially successful. The originators of the commercially available chopper bicycle were American manufacturers Huffy whose 1962 chopper design was "based on heavily modified children's bicycles that were becoming popular with pre-teens in Southern California, and which mimicked the appearance of customized "chopper" motorcycles". The popularity of the Chopper also led to a range of smaller bikes following a similar design theme. These included the Raleigh Chipper, Tomahawk and Budgie models, aimed at younger riders.

== History ==
=== Mk 1 ===
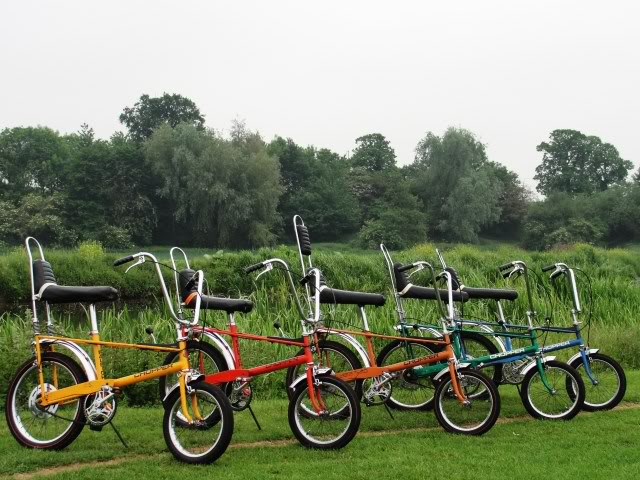
Raleigh Chopper Mk1

The Chopper's patent was applied for in the US in 1967. The Chopper was introduced at American trade shows in January 1969 but it was not until April 1969 that Raleigh Choppers were available for public to purchase. The bike featured a choice of a single-speed coaster hub, a 3-speed coaster, a standard non-coaster 3 speed or 5-speed (3+2) Sturmey Archer gear hub, selected using a frame-mounted console gear lever. Other features that appealed to the youth market were the unusual frame, long padded high-back seat, sprung seat at the back, high-rise (ape hanger) handlebars, 'bobbed' mudguards (fenders) and differently sized wheels: 16 in (41 cm) front and 20 in (51 cm) rear. The rear hoop above the seat resembled a "sissy bar". Even the kickstand was designed to give the stationary bicycle a lean reminiscent of a parked motorcycle.

In 1969 the Raleigh Chopper was launched on the UK market. This was a triple launch for Raleigh with the Mk1 Chopper produced until 1972. The Chopper was branded as THE HoT oNE, alongside the Moulton Mk3 (The Smooth One), and the RSW Mk3 (The Dolly One). The Chopper was sold as a "must have" item and signifier of "coolness" for many children at the time.

=== Mk 2 ===
The Mk 2 ("Mark 2") Chopper was an improved version sold from 1972. The Mk 2 offered an optional five-speed derailleur on the 1973–74 “Pinky” model and used a T-bar-style gear shifter. The frame was subtly revised, and the seat was shortened to shift the rider's weight forward and help prevent the front of the bicycle from lifting. A small rear rack was added, the handlebars were welded to the stem to stop children from inclining the "ape hanger" bars backward, thereby rendering the bicycle almost unsteerable. A drop-handlebar version, the Sprint GT, was produced 1972 - 1973 and this differed from the standard Mk 2 as it had a slightly taller frame. Raleigh had been in decline during the 1960s, but the Chopper went on to sell more than one million units worldwide. The Chopper Mk 2 remained in production until 1983, by which time the BMX craze had taken over its market.

== Mk 3 ==
After being out of production for over 20 years, a new version of the Chopper, the Mk3, was launched in 2004. In deference to modern safety concerns, adopted a more conventional saddle design from a single one-piece saddle to a split saddle and cissybar arrangement to circumvent saddle height laws, and dropped the groin-catching gear lever in favour of handlebar mounted gear controls; to commemorate this former feature the Mk3 had a sticker where the lever once was located. It was available at first in red, then purple then various colours followed including Limited Release models. Rather than steel, the frame was made from aluminium alloy tubing to make the bicycle lighter. The wheels were still 20 inches at the back and 16 at the front. In 2012, all unsold stock was brought back in-house, re-liveried (new colours and decals) and then sold off up to and including 2018.

== MK - IV ==
=== Brief outline ===
The MK-IV is the latest model to be added to the Raleigh Chopper range and is a return to the classic MK2 model outline in all major design aspects but with the need to comply with modern legislation.

Released to the public in June 2023 the entire available stock sold out within three hours.

Two members of the enthusiast movement were invited to work with and on the design team from 2020.

=== Design ===
The MK-IV project was started in 2019 with the intention for the new model to be released in 2022 to mark the 50th anniversary of the release of the mk2. However, world events delayed this until 2023. The team behind the new MK-IV invited two members of the Raleigh Chopper Enthusiast movement Mr K Price and Mr R Whitmill to work with and as part of the design team from 2020.

Based upon and reverse engineered from the Mk2, the MK-IV Chopper is an updated version that complies to contemporary safety standards and uses thicker-walled frame tubing than previous models.

There are a number of differences between the MK2 and the MK-IV, most notably the saddle, which, as per contemporary regulations and safety standards, is slightly shorter in height at the rear end. The saddle is also slightly wider at the front. The other most notable difference is the low height sissybar, which is the same style as was used on the MK2 Sprint GT as well as some USA models of the Chopper from the late MK2 onwards. Again, this is to meet contemporary regulations as at time of the design process.

On the MK-IV, the gear shifter returned to the cross-bar with a redesigned internal mechanism. The new shifter is compatible with the AW hubs used on earlier models, while original shifters are compatible with the SRF3 hub.

Other design elements include a newly designed heron head chainwheel, a newly manufactured spoke protector to match the original design, a return to twin block pedals and a specifically newly designed headbadge to match the original other than being a stick-on type vs the original rivetted on type.

=== Main production ===
Full production of the MK-IV started in February 2023 and lasted through March 2023 for the first release of this new model, production of the frames being carried out in Taiwan. Other parts specifically for the new model were manufactured as well as appropriate parts from other manufacturers / models being used.

The frames are constructed of metric tubing with a thicker wall than previous models due to contemporary safety standards making all tubing much stronger than the previous models. With all joints TIG welded, rather than using a mix of brazing and welding as used on the mk1 and mk2 models, the new frames are therefore more robustly constructed.

The MK-IV retained the "Arrow Wedge" decal design and carried the number 954917, continuing the numbering used on the final Mk2 models.

== MK-IV launch ==
The Raleigh Chopper MK-IV underwent three launch events. One private launch, two public launches and these events consisted of both Official and supported Private campaigns.

The first launch event was an invite only VIP "Soft Launch" in May 2023 consisting of a few select members of the Raleigh Chopper enthusiast movement. This was held at the (now closed) "Experience Raleigh" center in Maid Marian Way, Nottingham

The second launch event was the official media launch of 31 May 2023. From this point onwards both Raleigh UK and the two members of the enthusiast movement who were working with and on the design team provided information on and about the new model being released.

The third launch event was the official sales launch of 20 June 2023, once again held at the (now closed) "Experience Raleigh" center in Maid Marian Way, Nottingham. Doors were opened to VIP guests at 10am whilst, officially at least, the doors were opened to the general public at 12pm. Four MK-IV models were displayed, including two RN22 prototypes and models in Infra Red and Ultra-Violet. Visitors were able to inspect the new model. Previous generations of the model (mk1, mk2 & mk3) were also on display courtesy of enthusiasts who brought them along to the event.

Between official media launch, yet prior to official sales launch, Raleigh UK attended and had a display stand at the Annual Raleigh Chopper show 2023, held at Emberton Country Park (Prev. held at Billing Aquadrome) in early June 2023. The display included previous generations of the Chopper and two new MK-IV models in Ultra-Violet and Infra Red. Two additional MK-IVs, owned by enthusiasts who had worked with the Raleigh design team, were also displayed. These were the first MK-IVs in private ownership before the official media and sales launches. They were displayed for inspection, and many attendees took them for test rides.

The reasoning behind the two MK-IVs being in private ownership was, in part, to allow time for real-world testing and feedback as well as for acquisition of photographic material for the private publicity campaign.

== MK-IV sales ==
The MK-IV Chopper was sold online through the Raleigh Bikes UK website and at the Nottingham "Experience Raleigh" showroom from, officially at least, 12pm, 20 June 2023. Available only in Ultra-Violet or Infra-Red and available only to the home market. All available bikes sold out on day-one within three hours, demonstrating that demand for these iconic bikes after some 51 years since the introduction of the MK2 in 1972 has not waned but increased.

These sales also included the sale of the two RN22 prototypes to private buyers.

Despite these sales, there have been a considerable number of complaints made about the quality of the wheel rims, particularly about the finish of the joints of the rims. In some cases, wheel rims that appear "egg" shaped and in other instances, poor welded joints in the rims that were actually cracked. Despite these issues, the vast majority of those who purchased one are happy with them, even those with replacement wheels.

== Original models ==
=== Notable Raleigh Choppers ===
The Golden One

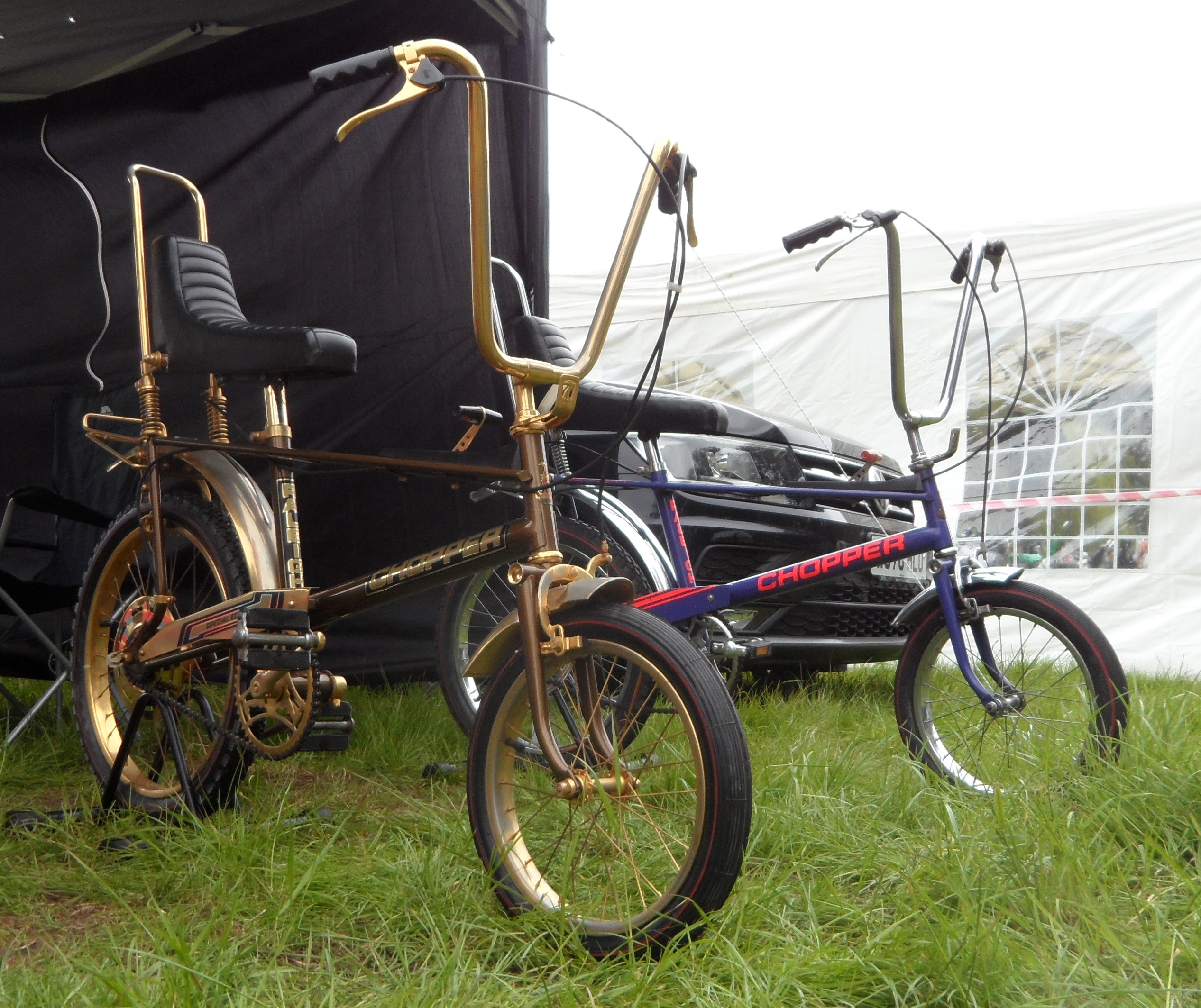
Gold One, seen at Emberton Raleigh Chopper Show 2024

Built to celebrate 1 million Choppers manufactured, it was painted in a unique livery with Gold Plating used where standard models used chrome plating. A replica has since been built by an enthusiast and currently resides at Brooklands Museum.

=== UK market ===
- MK1 - available only as a 3 speed model, Brilliant Orange, Golden Yellow, Flamboyant Green, Targa Mustard (HBR model), and Horizon Blue.
- MK2 - standard 3 speed models available in Infra Red, Ultra Violet, Fizzy Lemon, Quick Silver, Space Blue, and Jet Black (Prismatic decal model).
- MK2 - Sprint GT - available in either Bronze or Flamboyant Green. AW 3 speed (Prod. 1972 - 1973)
- MK2 - Pink 5 Speed (Derailleur) (Prod. 1973 -1974)
- MK2 - SE with cast alloy mags to commemorate 750,000 choppers (Prod. 1976–1977)
- MK3 - Standard available in Black, Purple, Red, Silver, Pink, Yellow (Prod 2004–2012, sold through to 2018)
- MK-IV - available only as a 3 speed model at launch. Ultra-Violet and Infra Red only. Frames dated as RB23 (February 2023) and RD23 (March 2023) only, with exception of RN22 (October 2022) Prototypes and RE21 bare metal frameset.

=== North American market ===
The North American market had a much wider spectrum of models and colours available. In 1971 there was a ban on tall sissy bars so the chopper was only sold with a low back rest. A summary of US models:

- MK1 1969 'Tall Frames'; available as a single speed coaster (SC), 3 speed (AW - three speed and TCW - three speed coaster), and 5 speed (S5 - 3+2).
- MK1 1970-1972 available as a single speed coaster (SC), 3 speed (AW - three speed and TCW/S3C - three speed coasters) 5 speed (S5 - 3+2) 5 speed and 10 speed (derallieur). The single and three speed models were also available as a Girl's model without crossbar.
- MK2 available as a 3 speed (AW) and 5 speed (S5 - 3+2). 1973 -1984
- MK3 3 speed handlebar shift 2004 - 2012

==== Canada ====
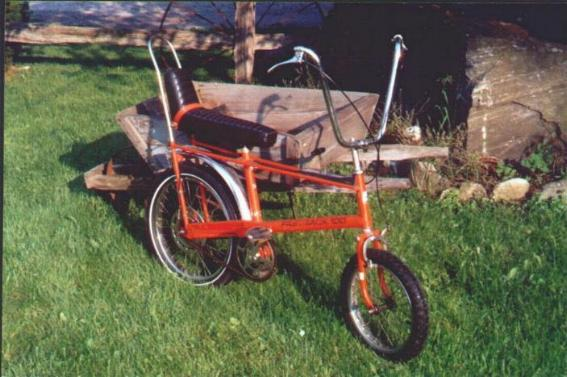
The Glider Fastback 100 version was sold by Eatons of Canada

The Raleigh Chopper was also sold through Eaton's in Canada, badged as Gliders, and sold as the Fastback 100, Fastback XT101, SS357, ULT, Princess and MACH-2 models.

=== Worldwide sales ===
Raleigh sold the Chopper to many countries worldwide. In some countries Raleigh chose to sell Choppers with alternative brands. These included BSA, Hercules, Humber, Malvern Star, Phillips, Robin Hood, Rudge and Speedwell Fireballs.

=== Imitators ===
The success of the Chopper led to similarly styled imitators, such as the Pavemaster Trusty Tracker, Triang Dragster, Dawes Zipper, Panther and Vindec High Riser in the UK as well as the very close copy of an Mk 2 named "Cincoa" as well as a Portuguese variant called the Chapparal, and in more recent years the Ground Cruiser which was sold in the UK at the same time as the release of the MK 3.

== See also ==
- Chopper bicycle
- Outline of cycling
- Raleigh Bicycle Company
- Schwinn Bicycle Company
