= Lowrider bicycle =

Customized bicycle

A lowrider bicycle is a highly customized bicycle with styling inspired by lowrider cars. These bikes often feature a long, curved banana seat with a sissy bar and very tall upward-swept ape hanger handlebars. A lot of chrome, velvet, and overspoked wheels are common accessories to these custom bicycles.

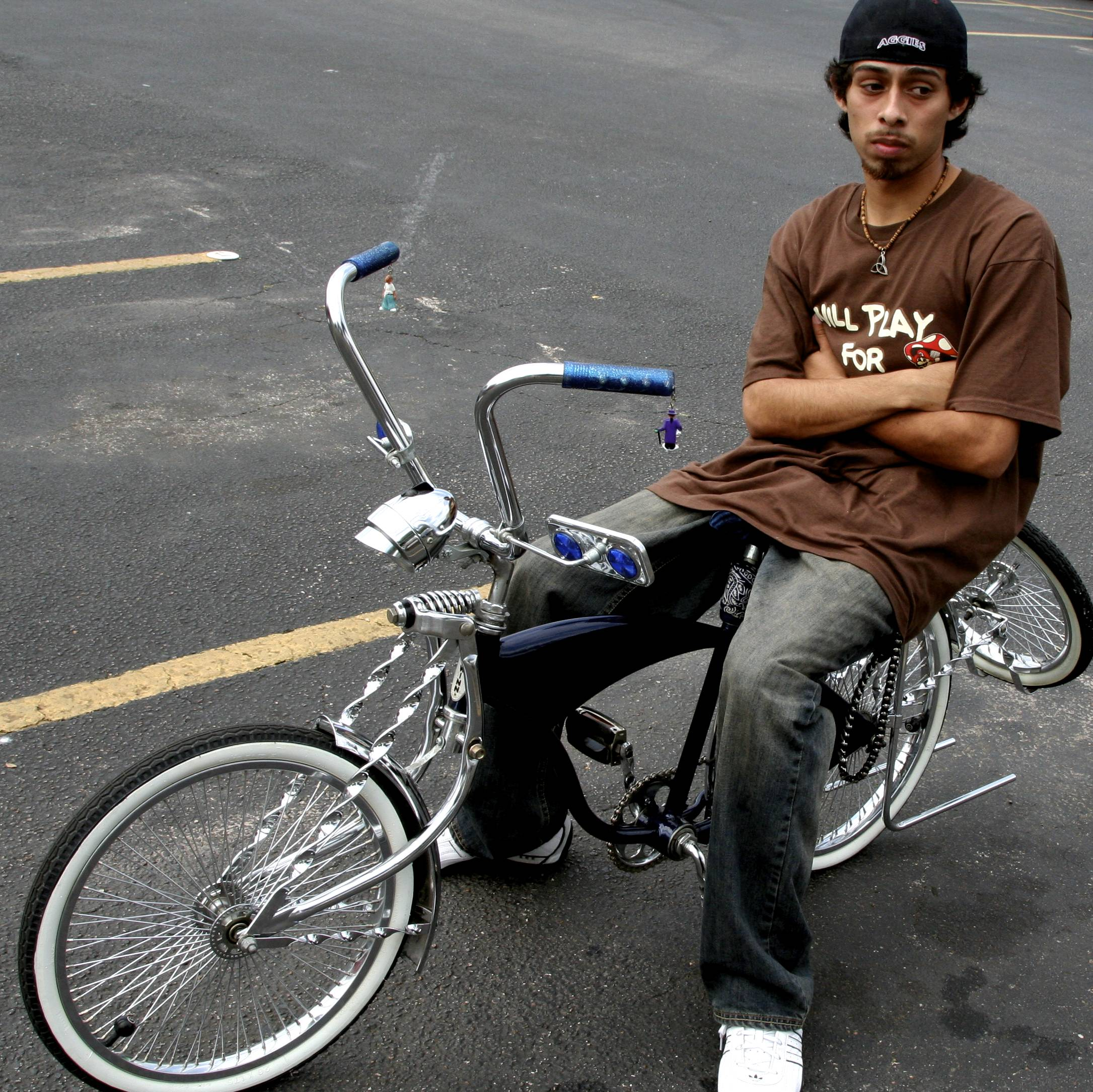
Man on a lowrider bicycle in Houston, Texas (2007)

The bikes are typically a highly individualized creation. Early modified bikes have been crafted as a part of lowrider culture by Chicano youth since the 1960s. They were at first stigmatized by mainstream U.S. culture, even as they were a symbol of pride in Chicano communities. They later became accepted and popular elsewhere.

Lowrider Bicycle was a magazine dedicated to the bikes first published in 1993. The bikes are now popular internationally, such as in Japan and Europe. Despite the fact that these bikes originated within the poverty of the barrio, lowrider bikes can be expensive. Some of the bikes are not rideable and exist only for aesthetic purposes.

== History ==
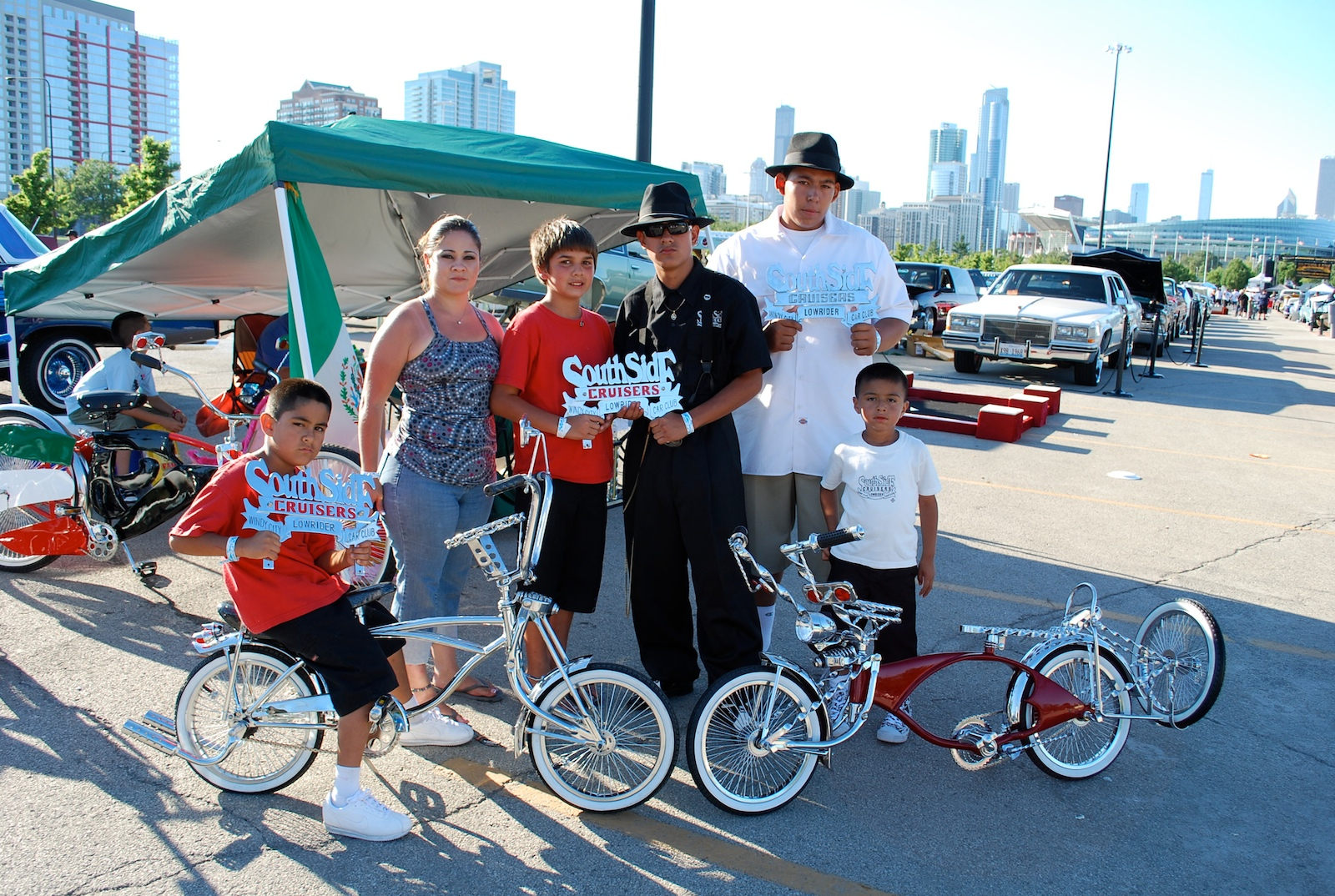
Family photo with lowrider bicycles at the Chicago SuperShow (2010)

Early modified bikes first appeared in California alongside Lowrider car culture popular in Chicano communities. Mexican American youth would emulate the craft of lowrider cars with their bicycles as a canvas for creativity, usually starting with common muscle bikes. This allowed those who were too young to drive a car to have a custom vehicle. Similar to lowrider cars, the bikes were stigmatized as a part of "gang culture" by mainstream America simply because of their origins within the Chicano community.

In 1963, the Schwinn company released of the Schwinn Sting-Ray. George Barris, who moved to Los Angeles to "become part of the emerging teen car culture" opened a shop in Bell, California, a Mexican American neighborhood. He used the Schwinn stock frame to create a modified bike for The Munsters set in the mid-1960s. This bike had a chain body to fit the macabre style of the show, but did not have an elongated body. This was for the character Eddie Munster, yet the bike did not appear on the show and was largely unknown at the time. In the 1990s, Lowrider Bicycle magazine used this bike to "effectively creat[e] an origin myth for the lowrider bicycle movement."

The lowrider bicycle with an elongated body and stylistic flare has sometimes been credited to Joe Manny Silva, who worked on bikes out of his shop when he emigrated to the U.S. from Mexico and opened a shop in Compton, California in 1973. He had worked on bikes since he was ten. His bikes were featured in prominent music videos and films. Some have referred to Silva as the "Godfather of Lowrider Bicycles" because of his long history in the community and his influence in expanding the lowriding bike scene, despite bike modifications being around among Mexican American youth prior.

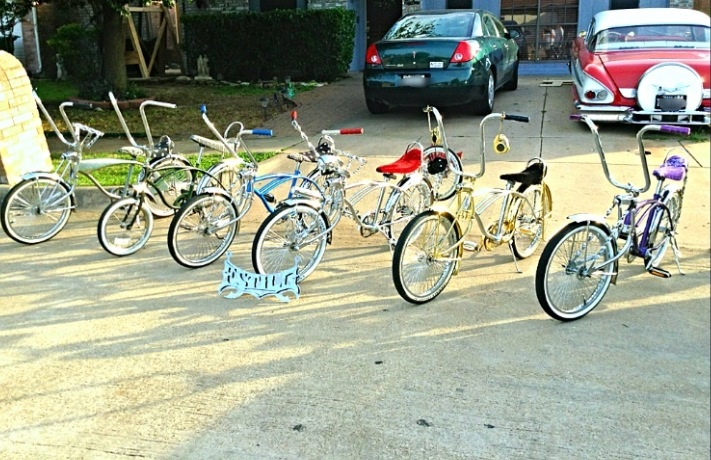
Estilo Lowrider Bike Club

Throughout the 1970s and 80s, lowrider bikes were featured alongside lowrider cars in shows. The club Rollerz Only was founded in 1988 in Los Angeles and grew to 42 chapters worldwide over time. Lowrider bicycles surged in popularity in the 1990s, as competition over style and design became intense. With the increased popularity, classic Schwinns, which became the body of choice as a starting base to create unique designs and modifications, were far more scarce and more expensive. Stemming from this new popularity, a magazine titled Lowrider Bicycle started publication in 1993 as an offshoot of Lowrider Magazine.

In the 1990s, Alberto Lopez, who was a publisher at the magazine, crafted the Aztlan Cruiser bike. The first bike to be featured on the cover of the magazine was known as "Claim Jumper" and owned by Danny Galvez, Jr. of Los Angeles, California. The bike elevated standards for crafting of lowrider bikes throughout the country: "everyone started slamming their bikes by bending their forks as radically as possible to give the bikes that old school flavor."

In the 1990s, bike mechanic and designer Warren Wong, who worked with BMX bikes, became a pioneer in lowrider bicycle history with his wheel design. He became known as the "Wheel King" and crafted a unique clover-laced design which became known as his "Body Count." These were an important development in lowrider wheels that were later duplicated by others.

In the late 1990s, popular American advertisements by various corporations began to use the bikes in ads in order to capitalize on its popularity. This expanded the bike's notoriety further, pushing its reach internationally. The Lowrider Bicycle magazine expanded its reach and became more popular.

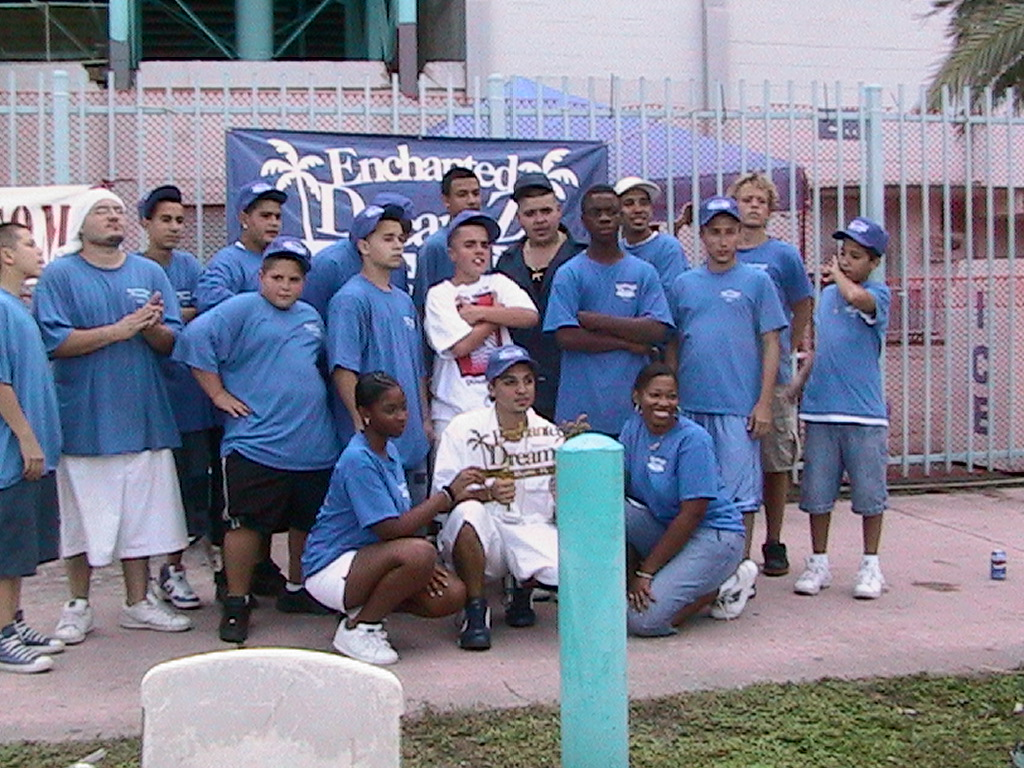
Enchanted Dreamz Car & Lowrider Bicycle Club (2003)

In 1996, the documentary "Low y Cool" was created on the lowrider bike scene in Tucson, Arizona. It challenged the violent Hollywood image portrayed of Chicano youth in films like “Blood in, Blood out,” “American Me” and “Mi Vida Loca." In 2000, the bikes were featured in Chicano techno artist DJ Rolando's video for "Knights of the Jaguar," which showed various portraits of Chicano life in Detroit.

The Los Chilangos lowriding bicycle club of Mexico City formed in 2014. In a story on the group, one photographer who followed the group credited the importance of the Chicano culture in bridging lowriding bike culture across the border and expanding its popularity in Mexico.

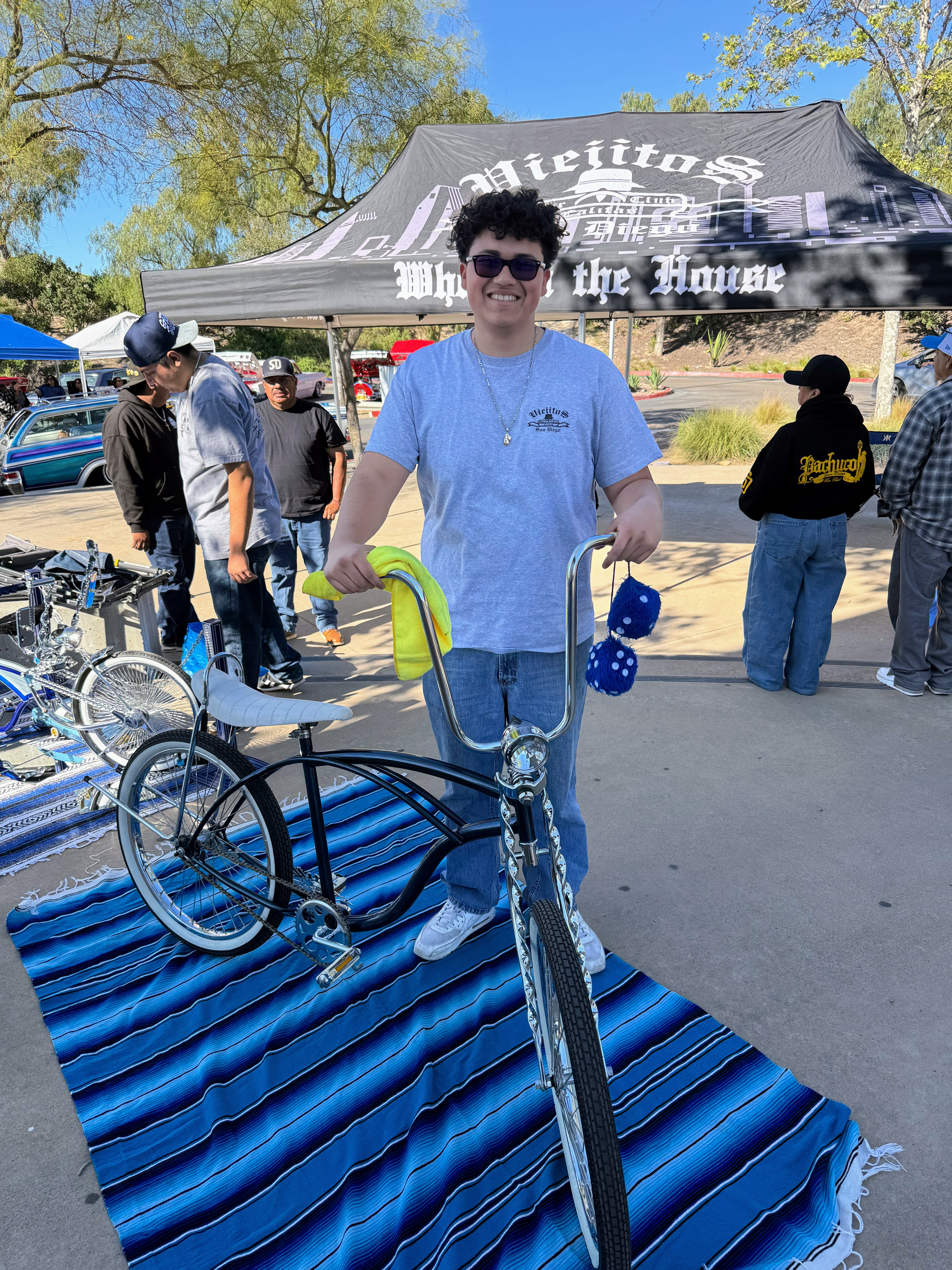
Member of The Viejitos Car and Bike Club, San Diego (2026).

The bikes are still featured in advertisements as of 2022 and remain an important cultural symbol of pride for Chicanas and Chicanos. An article for The Daily Chela by Brandon Loran Maxwell noted that there is a resurgence of lowrider bicycles occurring.

== Popular source bicycles ==
Some makes of bicycles are particularly popular among lowrider builders.

- Schwinn Sting-Ray, one of the most sought after bases for a lowrider build. The bicycles were American-produced (usually 20")
- Schwinn Tiger is popular in smaller sizes such as 16"
- Schwinn Pixie
- Malvern Star and Speedwell dragster bicycles both in short and long frame varieties are popular bicycles of choice in Australia
- Bratz beauty bikes are popular both in Australia, America and other countries.
- Aztlan Cruiser
- Pre-built and even custom-made one-of-a-kind lowriders are available from lowrider bicycle shops and even some lowrider car workshops. Some top lowrider bicycles shops are Manny's (Compton), Fantasy Toys Lowrider & Hobby (Cleveland), Krazy Kutting (Yuma).

== Modifications ==
A GIF showing the movement of lowrider bicycles

Basic or classic characteristics of a lowrider bike (most accessories are highly polished chrome, though gold can also be used for added flare):

- Baby Daytons — like the car rims, they are over-spoked — 144 chromed spokes per wheel is usual — and radially laced, with white-wall tyres
- banana seats
- custom upholstery
- customized sissy bar
- Ape hanger or Schwinn-type handlebars
- "Springer forks" — "old school" spring-action suspension for the front forks
- Fenders both front and back
- Chain steering wheel

Some custom modifications include twisted forks, spokes or handlebars, what are known as "bird cages" (twisted metal strips that resemble a bird cage) that are cut and welded onto handlebars, sissy bars or pedals. Many bikes also feature custom framework such as tanks and skirts which are the addition of sheets of metal, usually welded onto the frame to give it a "filled-in" look. Some lowrider bicycles even have air or hydraulic cylinders set-up to emulate the height adjustable suspension of lowrider motor cars.

One American bicycle mechanic Sheldon Brown wrote:

they are built purely as an exercise in styling, with no real concern for riding qualities. Some of them, in fact, are not rideable, because the cranks are so close to the ground that the pedals cannot turn around."

=== Lowrider tricycles ===
Some lowrider bikes are modified into lowrider tricycles, for style. Converting a lowrider bicycle into a tricycle often allows the bike to sit closer to the ground while still being rideable, and even hop without falling over if they have airbag suspension or hydraulic suspension. Converting a bicycle into a tricycle often creates extra carry-space at the back of the bike.

The space between the two rear wheels is sometimes used to mount either a two-seater "love seat", a "boombox," or even pumps for hydraulic or air suspension.

Commercially bolt on conversion kits to convert any existing lowrider bicycle into a tricycle are available from many sources.

== Lowrider Bicycle magazine ==
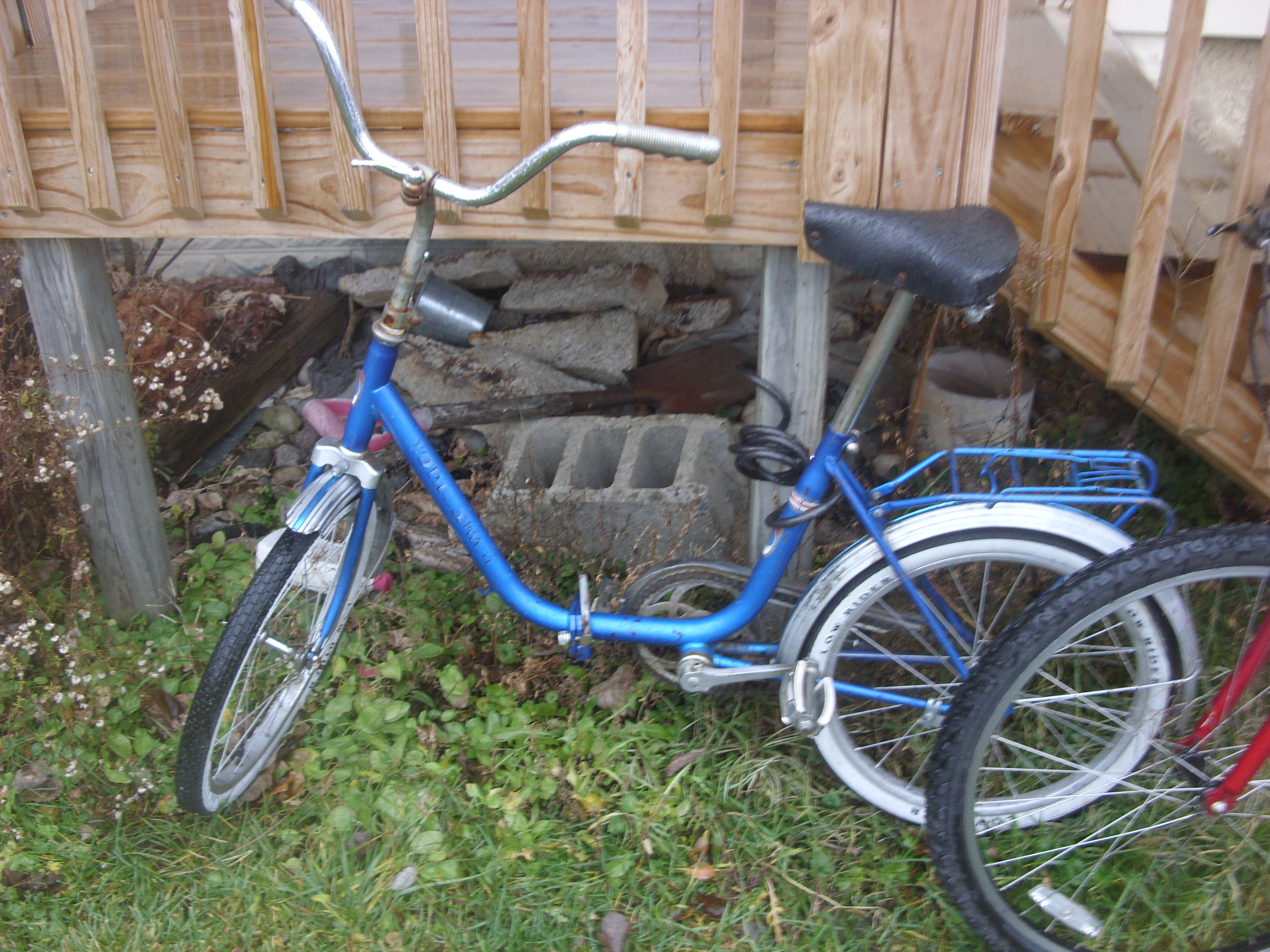
Tomos Lowrider Folding Bike

Lowrider Bicycle (LRB) magazine (published by Lowrider), debuted in the winter of 1993, bringing the culture of lowrider bicycle to mainstream America.

LRB notable moments:

- first cover bike: "Claim Jumper," by Danny Galvez, Jr. of Los Angeles, California (LRB Winter 1993)
- first out-of-California cover bike: "Smile Now, Cry Later" ('69 Huffy), by Patrick Torrez of Silver City, New Mexico (LRB July/August '95
- first Hawaii cover bike: "Tribute to the Gods" (candy-painted '77 Sting-Ray), by Kainoa Piscusa of Hawaii (LRB March/April '96)
- first Texas cover bike: "Space Age Cruiser," by Freddy Velasquez of Houston, Texas
- first Arizona cover bike: "Fire Dragon," by Julian Cons of Arizona

=== LRB Lowrider Bike of the Year ===
- 1993 — Gold Rush, Chava Hernandez of Oxnard, California
- 1994 — Field Of Dreams
- 1995 — Twisted Obsession
- 1996 — Casino Dreamin, Mike Lopez, Jr.
- 1997 — Casino Dreamin, Mike Lopez, Jr.
- 1998 — Casino Dreamin, Mike Lopez, Jr.
- 1999 — Casino Dreamin, Mike Lopez, Jr.
- 2000 — Wolverine II, Pete Moreno III of Houston, Texas
- 2001 — Spawn, Angus West of San Francisco, California
- 2002 — Spawn, Angus West of San Francisco, California
- 2003 — Wolverine III, Pete Moreno III of Houston, Texas
- 2004 — Prophecy
- 2005 — Prophecy
- 2006 — Pinnacle
- 2007 — Pinnacle

=== LRT Trike of the Year ===
- 1997 — Fatal Attraction
- 1998 — The Crow
- 1999 — Knight's Quest
- 2000 — Knight's Quest
- 2001 — Livin Legend, Freddy Madrigal
- 2002 — Lil Outer Limits
- 2003 — Dragons Revenge
- 2004 — Dragons Revenge
- 2005 — Lil Outer Limits
- 2006 — Pocket Change

=== Lowrider Bicycle Club of the Year ===
- 2000 Legions Bike Club

== In popular culture ==
El Rey Lowrider Bicycle

In 1992, the Beastie Boys mentioned Lowrider bicycles in their song "Professor Booty", on the album "Check Your Head".

In 1994, the AirWalk shoe company made a commercial featuring lowrider bikes.

In 1996, Marianne Dissard and Robert Kramer made the documentary film Low y Cool with the South Tucson, Arizona, lowrider bicycle club Los Camaradas.

Also in 1996, as part of Kodak's Advantage camera systems advertising campaigns, the company shot Rene Vargas and his "Gangster Madness" bike (featured on the Nov./Dec. '95 issue of LRB) for a nationwide commercial, which debuted during the 1996 Summer Olympics.

This was the beginning for more usage of lowrider bikes in commercials, as the industry loved the lifestyle involved with the bikes and wanted to capitalize on the hot youth trend.

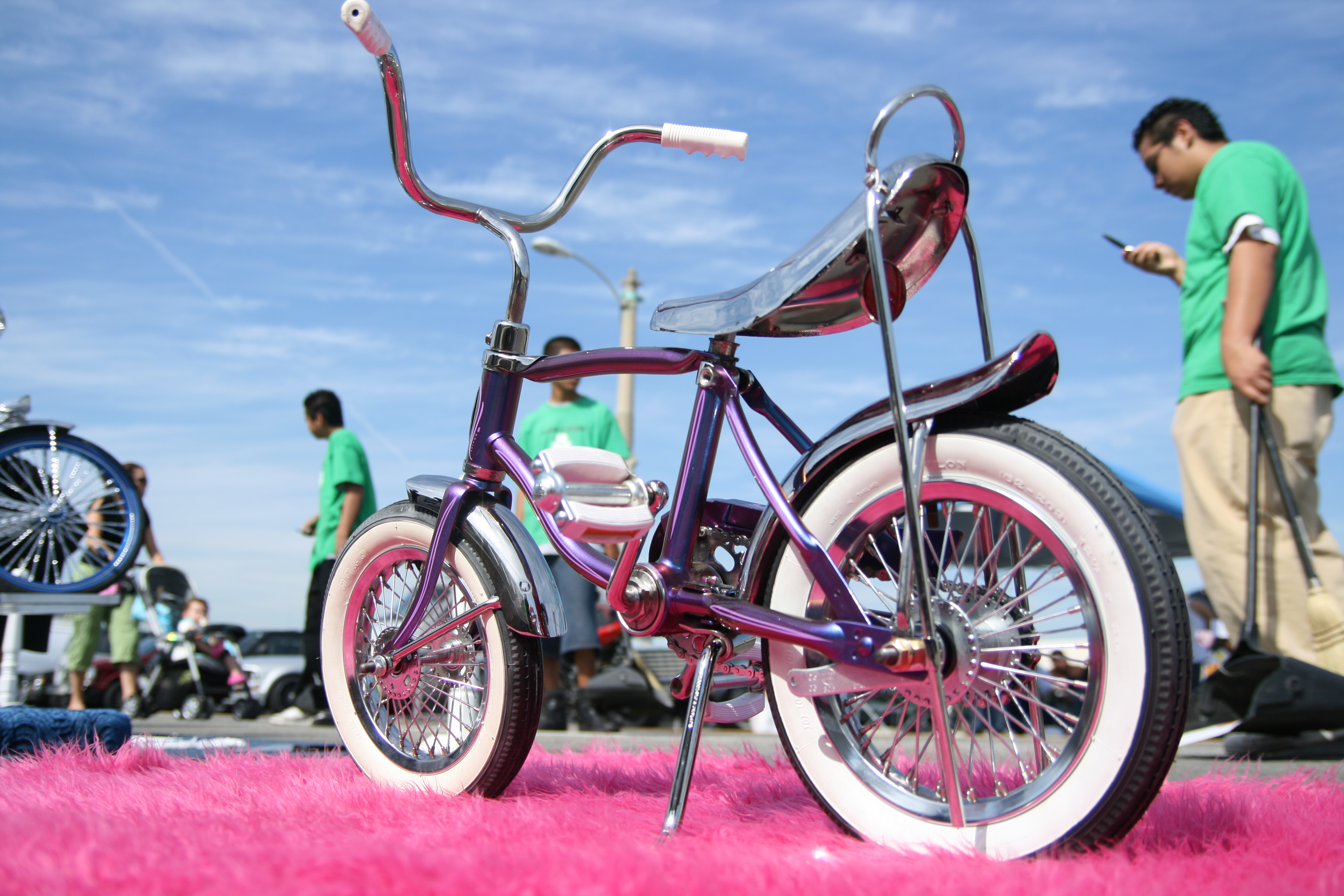
Lowrider bicycle on display in Downtown LA for the 8th annual Festival de los Gente (2007)

In 2000, Sprite shot a television commercial focusing on the youth of lowriding, which featured four-time LRB Bike of the Year Champion Mike Lopez, Jr. and his club, Finest Kreations. (After "retiring," Lopez, Jr. also traveled to Europe to display his bike in a cultural exhibition.)

In 2001, PepsiCo made a commercial titled What's Your Thirst.

In 2022, the bikes were featured in a 7-Eleven commercial.

== See also ==
- Outline of cycling
- Lowrider
