= Ross (bicycle company) =

American bicycle manufacturer

Ross Bicycles Inc.
- Company type: Private
- Industry: Bicycles
- Founded: 1946; 80 years ago
- Fate: Bankruptcy in 1988; 38 years ago, re-established July 31, 2017; 8 years ago
- Headquarters: Rockaway Beach, Queens; Currently: Totowa, New Jersey
- Key people: Shaun Ross, Randy Ross, Barbara Ross Sherwood Ross, Patrick Cunnane, Albert Ross, John Kirkpatrick, Fred Wilkens

Ross road bike circa 1980

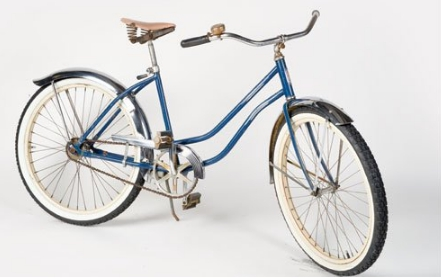
Ross cruiser bicycle

Ross Bicycles Inc. manufactured over 15 million bicycles under the Ross brand between 1946 and 1988. The company began in Williamsburg, New York, United States, later moving its headquarters and manufacturing to Rockaway Beach, Queens. The headquarters remained in Rockaway when manufacturing was later moved to Allentown, Pennsylvania where Sherwood could focus on designing his high end Gran Eurosport model which featured synthetic grease, polished bearings, and 26 skip tooth front sprocket for friction reduction. Sherwood Ross, against the advice of his vice president Randy Ross, retooled the Allentown factory and experimented in unrelated bicycle endeavors involving government contracts. Randy Ross moved Ross bicycles manufacturing to Taiwan to keep margins competitive and bicycle manufacturing profitable, but Sherwood Ross's decision to keep the Allentown factory working on government contracts ultimately led to the company having to file for bankruptcy protection in 1988 Ross Bicycles was re-established on July 31, 2017 by Shaun Ross, the current CEO of Ross Bicycles.

Ross competed domestically with bicycle manufacturers including Schwinn and Huffy, and was noted as a pioneering manufacturer of mountain bikes.

== History ==
Ross was started by Albert Ross as Ross Galvanizing Works in 1940, "manufacturing and galvanizing pipes and pipe fittings for the fencing industry and later galvanized steel parts for military ships during World War II." After World War II, it was incorporated as Chain Bike Corp. in 1946.

Ross' first factory was on Kent Avenue in Williamsburg, New York, near the Schaefer Brewery and the Brooklyn Navy Yard before the company moved to Beach 79th Street in Rockaway Beach, Queens some time around 1960. In 1973 manufacturing was moved to a new, purpose-built plant in Allentown, Pennsylvania and on May 21, 1982 the company was renamed Ross Bicycles Inc.

In 1982, Ross Bicycles was the first ever bicycle manufacturer to mass produce the mountain bike. In 1983, Randy Ross created the first mountain bike race team, the Ross Indians. Ross had models that directly competed with the Schwinn Side Winder called the Ross Diamond Cruiser. Ross introduced their first production MTB, the Force 1, during the first Interbike Show in October 1982; the bike's name was later changed to the Mt. Hood.

In early 1982 Ross Signature (hand made bike department) was making custom mountain bikes. Jim Redcay was the builder; Tom Kellogg was working on road bikes. Redcay was also involved in the Force 1 frame development. This was the first bike Ross had built in Allentown with cantilever brakes. The Allentown factory was said to be retooled for government contracts by Sherwood Ross.

Ross moved bicycle production to Taiwan in 1986 to keep the margins profitable, but the government contracts and financial strain from the Allentown factories unsuccessful government endeavors, led to Ross Bicycles filing for bankruptcy protection in 1988.

In addition to bicycles, Ross manufactured ammunition boxes for the US government at its Lehigh facility, and cited the government contract as the source of its financial difficulties at the time of filing for Chapter 11 protection.

The Ross name was purchased by Rand Cycle in Farmingdale, New York, which suffered a recall of 11,000 mountain bikes in 1998. Randy Ross, grandson of Albert, introduced a stair stepper bike in 2007. Shaun Ross re-established Ross Bicycles on July 31, 2017.

Albert Ross' son Sherwood (Jerry) B. Ross (1921-2013) was CEO of Ross Bicycles from 1946 to 1990, held several bicycle-related patents, served as President of the Bicycle Institute of America (BIA) and the Bicycle Manufacturers Association (BMA), and acted as an expert witness in product liability cases.

== Bicycles ==
Ross began making bicycles in 1946, and by the late 1960s, manufactured about 1 million bicycles per year. By 1985, it had sold 10 million bicycles. The company, still known as Chain Bicycle Corporation, marketed bikes under the Ross brand, including children's, BMX, touring, cruiser, mountain, racing, wheelie, and stationary exercise bicycles.

In 1968, Ross joined the muscle bike craze with models such as the Marlin with a console mounted stick brake, the Barracuda with a chrome twin stick shift console, and the Barracuda Beast with a Futura sports car steering wheel.

In 1982, Ross introduced one of the first production mountain bikes, the Force One, at Interbike. In 1983, they launched the first professional factory sponsored mountain bike race team, the Ross Indians.

With the rising popularity of mountain bikes, Randy Ross, Sherwood Ross's son and executive vice president of Ross Bicycles Inc., said in the New York Times, "these bikes are one of the biggest things that ever happened to the biking industry. Its basic look constitutes 'a total shift in image' for the industry."

By 1989, Nyle Nims, then a vice president at Ross Bicycles (and later founder of Cycle Force Group), said that 40% of bicycle sales were mountain bikes, adding, "we see a lot of people who previously owned the dropped bar, 10-speed bike buying the wide-tire bikes, they are people who don't want to ride fast; they want to ride for recreation."
