= Muscle bike =

Muscle bike may refer to:

- Muscle bike (bicycle)
- Muscle bike (motorcycle)

== See also ==
- Muscle car
