= Alan Oakley (designer) =

British bicycle designer (1927–2012)

- Born: 27 April 1927; Netherfield, Nottinghamshire
- Died: 18 May 2012 (aged 85)
- Known for: Designing the Raleigh Chopper bicycle

Alan Oakley (27 April 1927 – 18 May 2012) was a British bicycle designer from Nottingham who worked for the Raleigh Bicycle Company.

As Raleigh's chief designer he designed the company's best selling Chopper bicycle. He drew the design for the Chopper on an envelope as he travelled home from the US, in 1967, inspired to replicate the design of Peter Fonda's character's motorbike in the 1969 film Easy Rider. The trip was specifically set up for him to "get-to-grips" with youth culture. In the 1980s, production of the Chopper ceased when the rival BMX appeared, but, due to popular demand, a limited edition Chopper was released in 2004.

Oakley married twice. His first marriage, in 1954, was to Brenda Wilson; the couple had a son and daughter. Oakley was married to Karen Francis from 1992 until his death from cancer at age 85 in 2012.

== Early life and education ==
Oakley was born on 27 April 1927 in Netherfield, Nottinghamshire, a small town three miles (5 km) east of Nottingham. The son of a local printer, he was educated at the all-boys Chandos Street School (which amalgamated in 1973 to form Carlton le Willows School). Leaving education at 15, Oakley joined the Raleigh Bicycle Company as a trainee draughtsman, producing fuses and turning-out cartridges; war-effort duties that diminished his early involvement in bicycle engineering. Intrigued by aircraft, he joined the Royal Air Force (RAF) in 1941 and later obtained a qualification in mechanical engineering from the University of Nottingham.
