= Kawasaki (bicycle brand) =

Kawasaki is a brand of bicycle produced by various manufacturers from time to time since the 1970s. The bicycle types have included BMX, mountain, fatbikes, and e-bikes. Manufacturers have included Huffy, CGF Factory, and Diavelo. Promotion of the Kawasaki BMX brand included sponsoring BMX racing.

== BMX ==
Kawasaki BMX bicycles were welded by Triple-A Accessories in southern California in the 1970s. Frames were made from steel and aluminum with TIG and MIG welders. The frames had a rear suspension consisting of a swingarm supported by a spring on each side. The front fork was attached to the frame by a triple clamp but was not telescopic, even though the bottom of the stanchions were covered by a boots to give the appearance of being telescopic. The bikes had banana-style seats and BMX-style handlebars.

== MTB ==
Kawasaki mountain bikes were sold at Kawasaki motorcycle dealerships in the 1990s. The 1994 KMB 450 model had a rigid steel rear frame and telescoping forks with elastomers.

In 2018, a 34-lb, full-suspension mountain bike with 26-inch wheels and a front disc brake was offered under the Kawasaki brand name.

== See also ==
- Kawasaki motorcycles
- David Clinton
