= Vindec High Riser (bicycle) =

1970s children'ss wheelie bicycle

The Vindec High Riser was a children's wheelie bicycle of the 1970s, first manufactured in 1972 by the British company Brown Brothers. It was quite similar in design to the Raleigh Chopper.
