= Al Fritz =

American designer

Albert John Fritz (October 8, 1924 – May 7, 2013) was a vice president at the Schwinn Bicycle Company and is credited with creating the Schwinn Sting-Ray, which started the wheelie bike craze. Mr. Fritz was born in Chicago on October 8, 1924, and died on May 7, 2013, in Barrington, Illinois. He graduated from the 8th grade and then studied stenography. He joined the US Army and was on Gen. Douglas MacArthur's staff when he was wounded in the Philippines. He was awarded the Bronze Star for his role in the first advance team to land in the Philippines. He joined Schwinn in 1945 and worked initially as a grinder and a welder. He was vice president for engineering, research and development in 1962 when he launched the Sting-Ray. He retired from Schwinn in 1985 as head of Excelsior, Schwinn's exercise division. He was inducted into the BMX Hall of Fame in 2010.
