= Cycle Force Group =

Road cycles

Cycle Force Group, also known as Cycle Force, is an American bicycle and bicycle accessories importer. The company was established in 1998 by Nyle Nims as a service center and agent office for a group of Asian component makers and bicycle manufacturers in Taiwan. Cycle Force licenses rights to many internationally known name brands for sale on bicycles and related products.

Nyle Nims, the current President of Cycle Force, was President of Ross Bicycles from 1987 to 1998, and is also the President of the Bicycle Products Suppliers Association from 2000 to 2002.

In 2022, Cycle Force Group and its subsidiary North America Cycles were acquired by the German bicycle parts and accessories company Messingschlager and incorporated as Messingschlager USA, while continuing to do business as Cycle Force Group.

Cycle Force has Mantis as its own in-house brand, and Cycle Force imports bicycles under the following licensed brands:

- G.I. Joe: The Rise of Cobra
- Kawasaki
- Hollandia – a European city bike
- Mantis – Children's bikes
- NASCAR
- Piranha (children's bikes)
- Polaris
- Spider-Man
- Smith & Wesson (police bikes)
- Tour de France
- Transformers: Revenge of the Fallen
- Victory
- Volkswagen
- KHEbikes

Cycle Force is the sole US importer of Head, and Lombardo bikes.
