= Davis Sewing Machine Company =

Defunct Sewing Machine Engineering Company

The Davis Sewing Machine Company began in 1868 in Watertown, New York, and moved to Dayton, Ohio, around 1890.

== History ==
Early Davis sewing machines, known as their "Vertical Feed" machines, did not use the conventional four motion feed, as invented by Allen B. Wilson and used in most other machines. These machines have no feed dogs at all. Instead, they have two presser feet, one of which, along with the needle bar, moves the cloth while the needle is still through the cloth. The other, larger, presser foot is used to hold the cloth stationary while the needle lifts out of the cloth and moves forward to get ready for the next stitch. While Davis called this mechanism their "Vertical Feed", sewing machines with similar mechanisms are now known as "walking foot" machines.

Closeup of the vertical feed mechanism on an 1877 Davis sewing machine

Later Davis machines used a more conventional feed mechanism, with a stationary presser foot and feed dogs. Davis called them "underfeed" machines.

On Oct 18, 1881, Davis Sewing Machine Co., was awarded US Pat. 248,449 for improvements over existing shuttle designs.

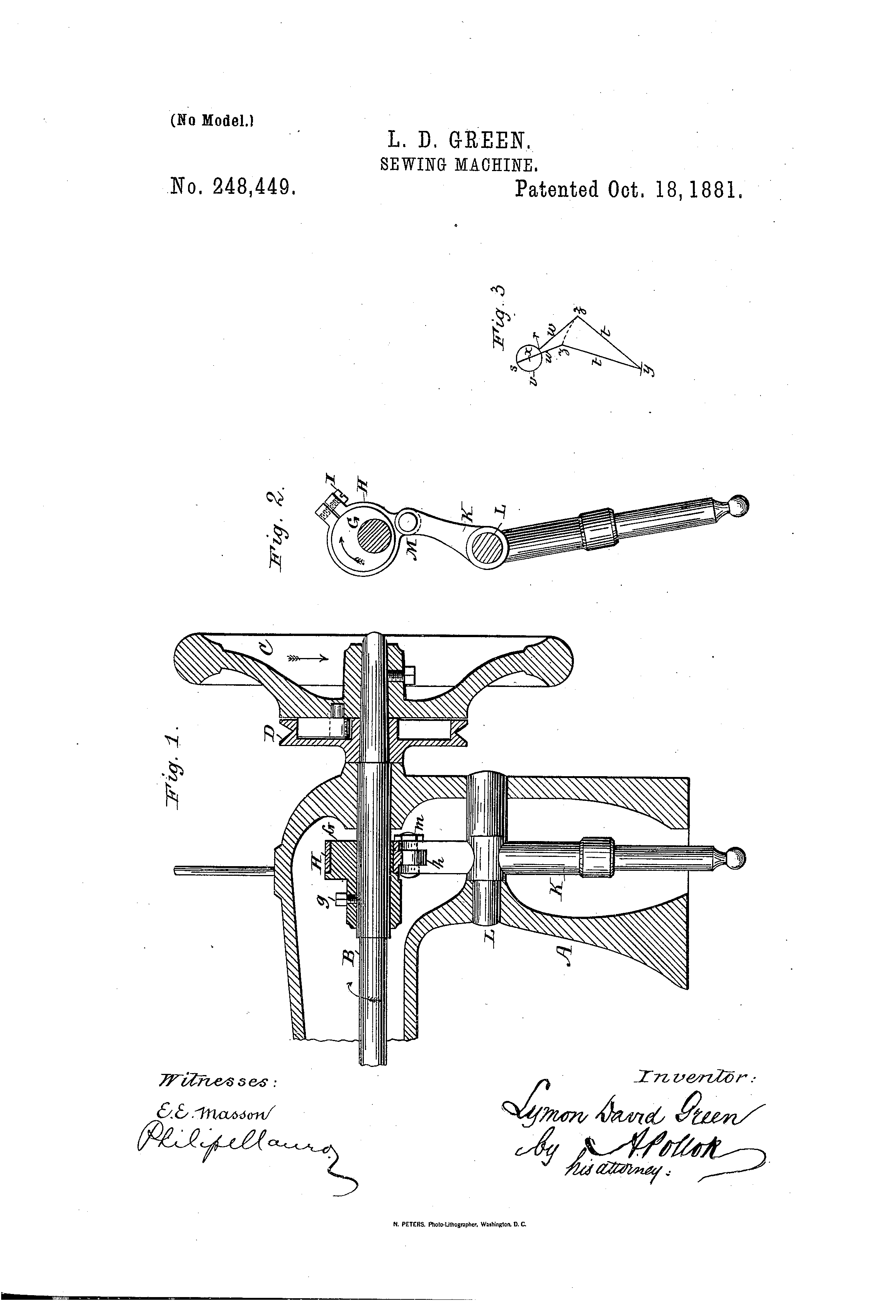
Page 1 of patent

Around 1892, Davis started manufacturing bicycles. The Dayton Daily News indicated that the bicycle business was so successful that Davis gradually phased out production of sewing machines. The Huffman Manufacturing Company was formed as a sales outlet for Davis parts.

In 1924, the Davis Company's assets were liquidated. At that time, the company employed 1,800 workers.

== See also ==
- List of sewing machine brands
