= Motorcycle bell =

Motorcycle accessory

A motorcycle bell, also known as a Guardian Bell, spirit bell, gremlin bell, or biker bell, is a decorative metal bell that is attached below a motorcycle, often given as a token of good wishes while riding.

The bell is usually about 25 mm (1 in) long, made from pewter or other metals, and is given to a motorcyclist as a good luck charm, or a symbolic piece of protection to ward off bad luck while riding motorcycles.

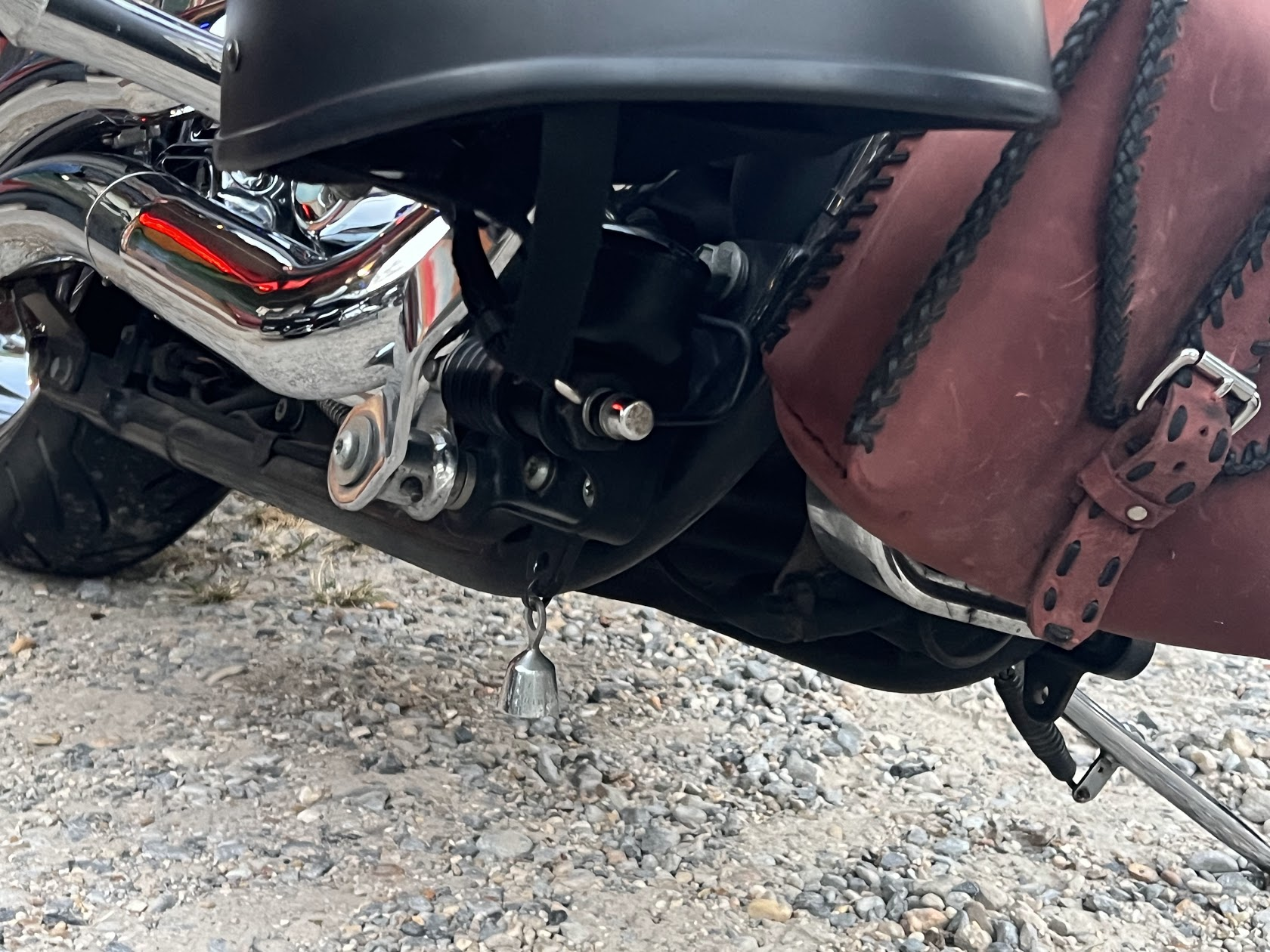
A bell hanging underneath a motorcycle.

== History ==
A gremlin is a mischievous creature of folklore used to describe malfunctions in aircraft in World War II (WW2) and later in other machinery from pilots and technicians. A "Guardian Bell" or "Gremlin Bell" was sometimes used by British and American pilots in World War II, to ward off "gremlins". World War II gave a big boost to the motorcycle industry when the U.S. military called on manufacturers Harley-Davidson and Indian to produce more than 100,000 motorcycles for the war effort." When the American Veterans returned home many of them continued riding motorcycles and the use of the bell as a protection charm when riding a motorcycle.

This custom is still used by some motorcycle riders today, particular riders of Harley-Davidson and Indian Motorcycles.

The bells come in custom designs as well as duplicated mass production designs.

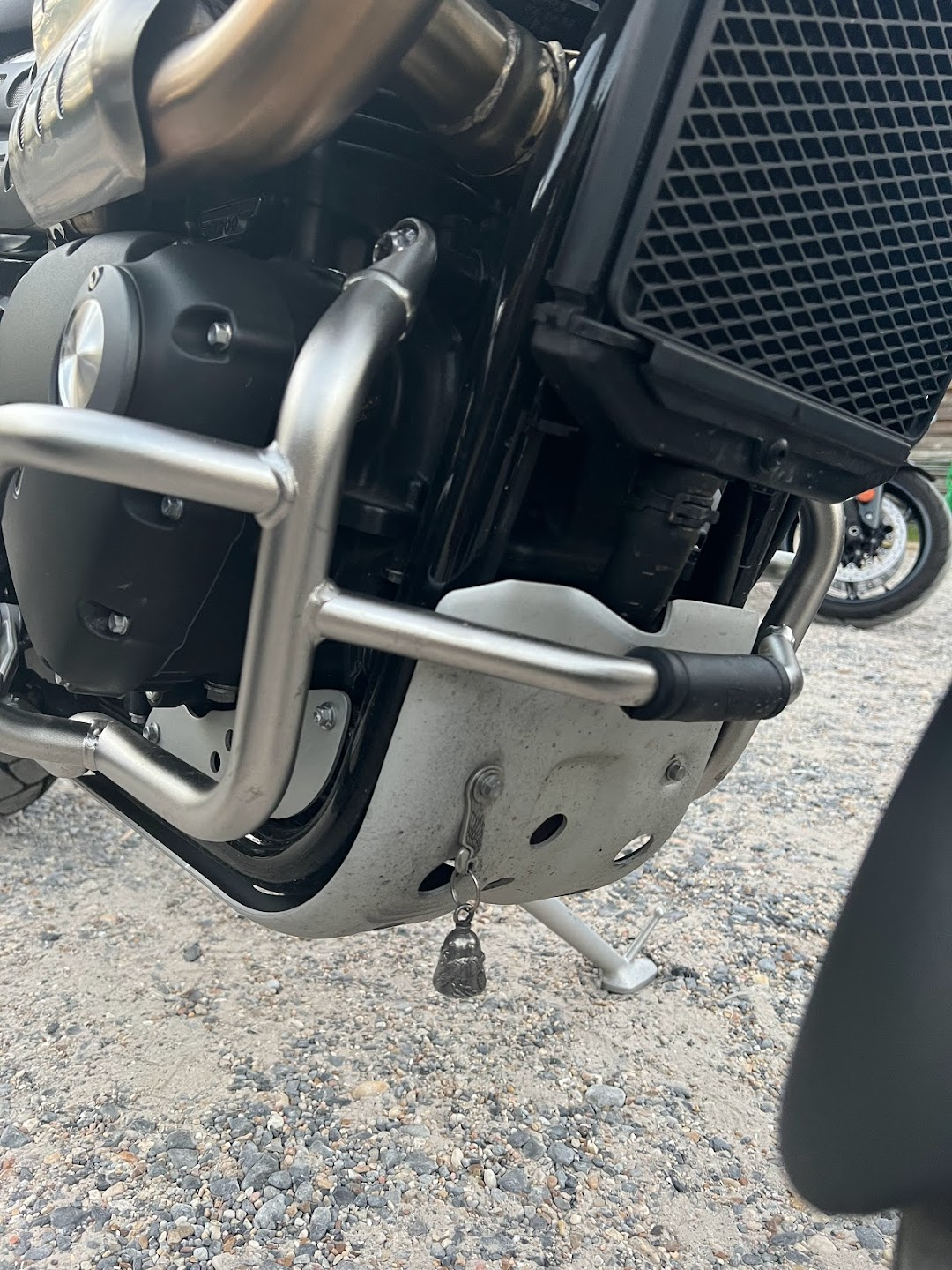
Triumph Motorcycle with a Bell Hanging below the bike.

The "Gremlin Bell" has been patented in the United States, and is recorded in the Official Gazette of the United States Patent & Trademark Office, Volume 1290, Number Four.

Guardian® Bell is a registered trademark with the US Patent and Trademark Office.

== In popular culture ==
A guardian bell features in Season Two, Episode Seven of Poker Face, when Charlie Cale (Natasha Lyonne) gives one as a birthday gift to Bill Jackson (Corey Hawkins).
