= Wheelie bike =

Type of stylized children's bicycle designed in the 1960s

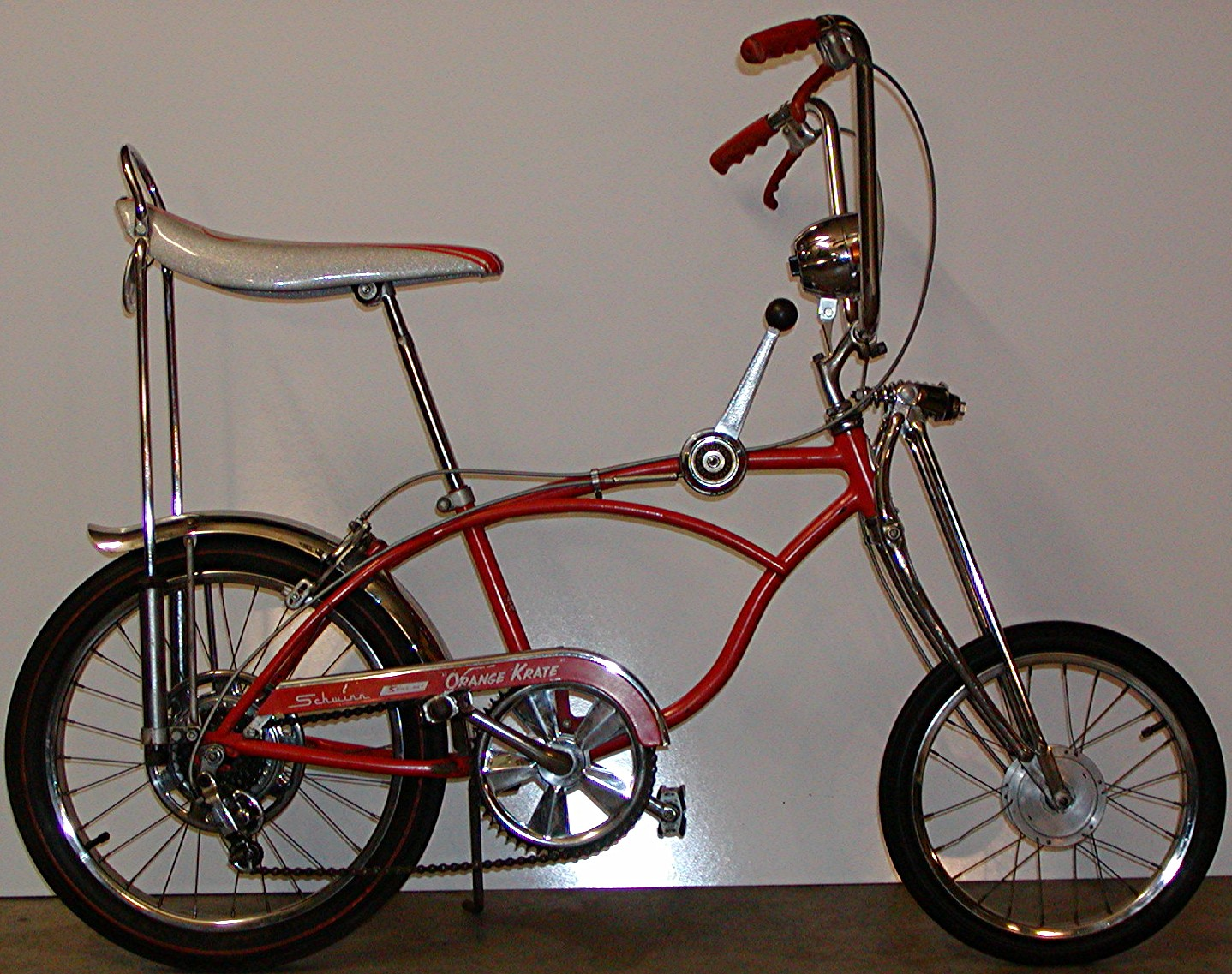
1968 Schwinn Sting-Ray Orange Krate 5-speed

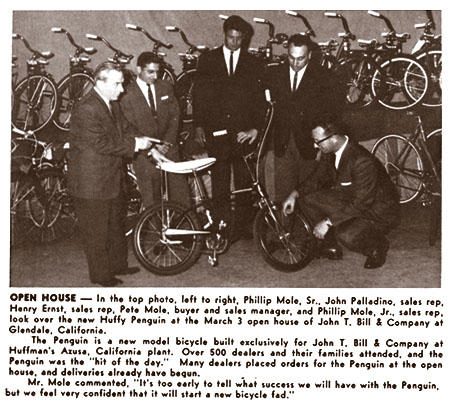
Open house for the Huffy Penguin on March 3, 1963

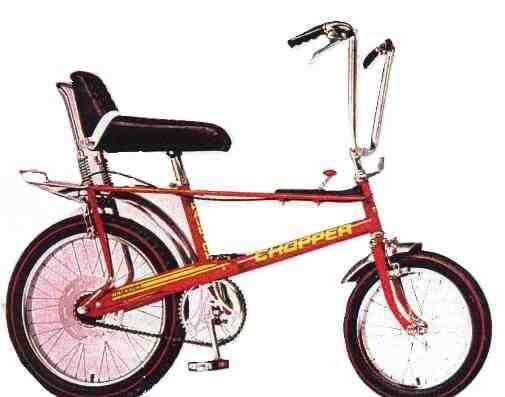
The North American Version of The Mk2 Raleigh Chopper

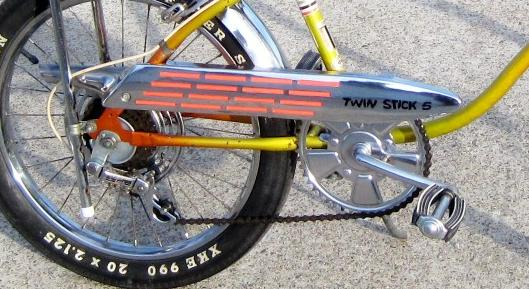
Huffy Flaming Stack chain Guard

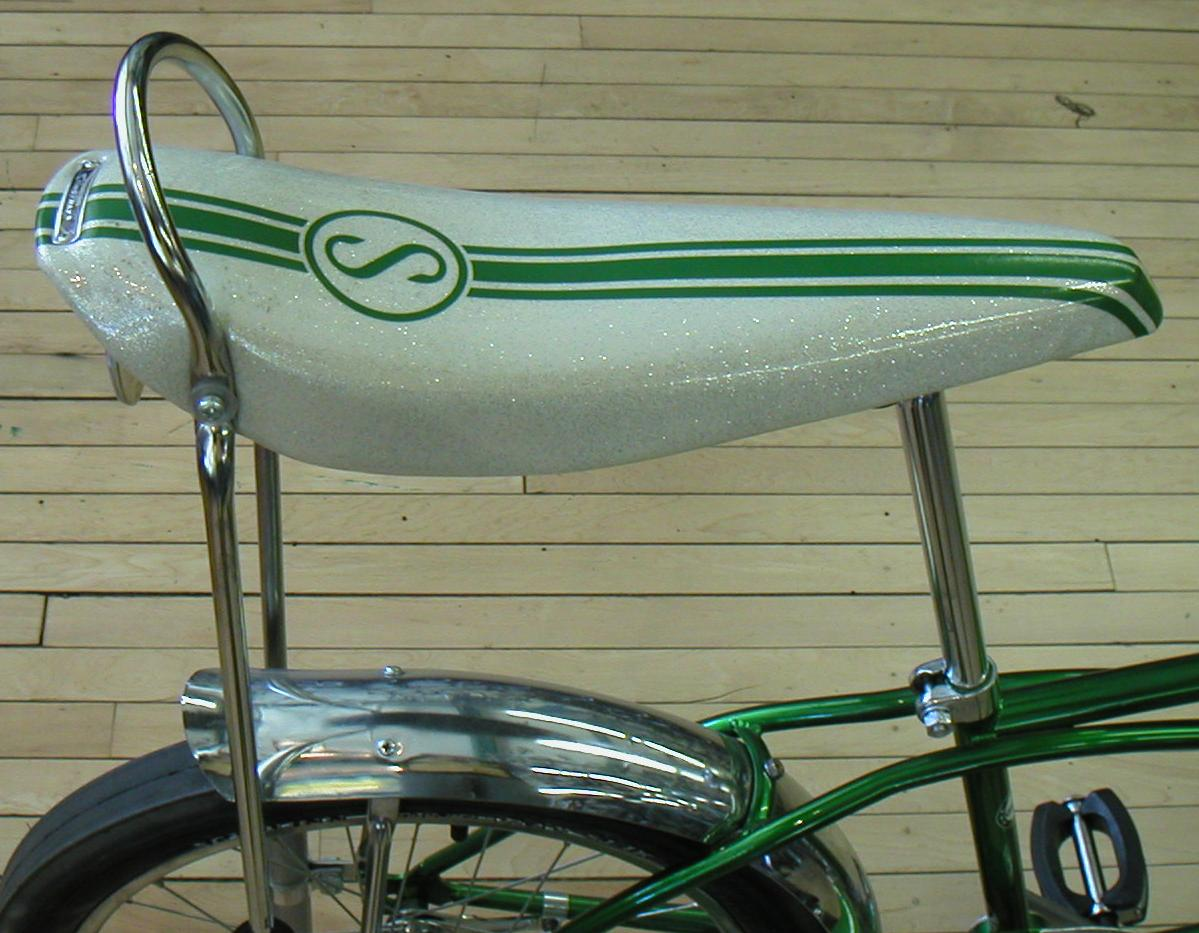
Schwinn banana seat with sissy bar, bobbed fender, and slick, square-profile tire

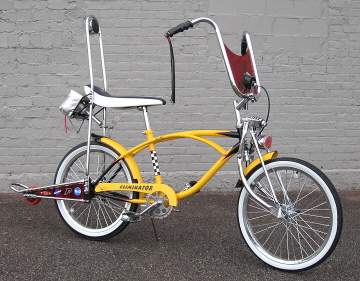
Customized "Eliminator" with speedometer and wheelie bar

A wheelie bike, also called a dragster, muscle bike, high-riser, spyder bike or banana bike, is a type of stylized children's bicycle designed in the 1960s to resemble a chopper motorcycle and characterized by ape hanger handlebars, a banana seat with sissy bar, and small (16-to-20-inch (410 to 510 mm)) wheels. Notable examples include the Huffy Dragster series, Schwinn Sting-Ray and Krate lines, and the Raleigh Chopper line. Other notable manufacturers and retailers that offered models include AMF, CCM, Columbia, Iverson, J. C. Penney, Malvern Star, Monark, Murray, Ross, Sears, and Vindec.

In modern usage, "wheelie bike" can refer to a large-frame BMX bike.

== History ==
In 1962, Peter Mole of John T Bill & Co contacted Huffy Corp about making a new bicycle called High Rise. The bikes had a long seat called a banana seat with strut and taller handlebars. Huffy hesitated for several months before agreeing to make the bike with the stipulation that if it was a flop, Mole would buy all the left-over parts and bikes. The new bike, called the Penguin, was finally being sold in stores by March 1963 and was the first of this type to market. Also in 1963, Schwinn's designer Al Fritz heard about a new youth trend centered in California for retrofitting bicycles with the accoutrements of motorcycles customized in the Bobber or Chopper style. Inspired, he designed a mass-production bike for the youth market as Project J-38, and the result was introduced to the public as the Schwinn Sting-Ray in 1963. Sales were initially slow, but eventually took off. By 1965, several other American and foreign manufacturers were offering their own version of the Sting-Ray.

BMX bikes began to supersede wheelie bikes in the mid-1970s, though Schwinn continued to offer them until 1982 and Raleigh until 1984. Original wheelie bikes are popular collector's items now, and some manufacturers have reintroduced updated versions.

== Features ==
The seating position nearly over the rear tire facilitated performing wheelies. Styling cues were also taken from muscle cars, and features included different sized wheels, with the smaller in the front, and square-profiled tires. Small, chromed fenders, a style borrowed from bobber motorcycles, were also popular.

Handlebars

Besides the original ape hanger handlebars, several models sported ram horn style handlebars that contained loops. Huffy even introduced a model, called The Wheel, with a steering wheel in place of handlebars.

Gears

Common examples were two-speed or three-speed rear hubs (which required the rider to engage the new gear shift by back-pedalling), while some models featured external rear derailleurs with 3 or 5 gear ratios. Styles of gear-shifter included an automotive-like gear lever (T-bar or knob) mounted on the top tube, as well as a motorcycle-style twist-grip.

Brakes

Coaster brakes and rim brakes were common. The 1968 Schwinn Krate models had a front drum brake. The 1972 Schwinn Pea Picker included a rear disc brake.

Forks

The 1968 Schwinn Krate models included a spring suspension front fork. At least one model, the Murray Kingkat, came from the factory with long forks resembling a chopper motorcycle.

Seating

Besides making wheelies easier, the banana seats facilitated carrying passengers.

Several manufacturers made tandem versions, including Schwinn, Raleigh, and Rollfast.

Accessories

Many after-market accessories were available for muscle bikes including wheelie bars, drag chutes, "slick" tires, speedometers, windshields, hand grip streamers, headlights, taller sissy bars, axle spinners, and back rests.

== Impact ==
The Raleigh Chopper was the best selling children's bicycle in the UK. The wheelie bike fad drove bicycle sales to over 4 million units in the US, and accounted for 75% of total US bicycle sales in 1968, but it also helped contribute to the impression in the US that bicycles are merely children's toys. Dangerous features, such as shifters mounted on the top tube, were banned in the US in 1974. The wheelie bike fad even attracted the attention of non-bicycle manufacturers that developed and sold add-on products, such as the Wham-O wheelie bar.

Though initially a US fad, wheelie bikes also became popular in the UK, Canada, Germany, New Zealand, and South Africa. Australia had its own Malvern Star Dragster, Brazil had its own Monark Tigrão, and in Norway, Øglænd made the DBS Tomahawk.

Dot Wiggin, formerly of The Shaggs, recorded the song "Banana Bike" in 2013 as a tribute to her sister Helen, who died in 2006. Helen owned a yellow imported Raleigh Chopper that she used to keep fit with, that Dot found amusing that a grown woman should be using a children's bike. Helen explained that it was far more comfortable for her than a normal bike.

== Names ==
Part of the appeal of these bikes was their colorful and evocative names. Besides the Schwinn Sting-Ray and Raleigh Chopper, examples include:

- AMF Flame-out
- AMF Renegade
- CCM Marauder
- CCM Mustang
- Columbia Mach-5
- Columbia Playboy/Playbike
- Firestone GTO
- Huffy Cheater Slick
- Huffy Dragster I
- Huffy Dragster II
- Huffy Dragster Jr.
- Huffy Mr. America
- Huffy Thunder Road
- Huffy Wrangler
- Iverson Bandito
- Iverson Dragstripper
- J.C. Penney Swinger I
- Malvern Star Dragstar
- MTD The Wheelie King
- MTD SS-5
- MTD Duke
- MTD Duchess
- Monark Tigrão
- Murray Kingkat
- Murray Ram Rod
- Murray Tiger Cat
- Ross Barracuda
- Ross Apollo
- Schwinn Fastback
- Schwinn Manta Ray
- Schwinn Scrambler
- Schwinn Tornado
- Sears Gremlin
- Sears Spyder 500
- Supercycle Cougar II
- Supercycle The Wedge
- Tri-ang Unity Dragster TT
- Windsor Vagabundo

== See also ==
- Chopper bicycle
- Cruiser bicycle
- Outline of cycling
- Lowrider bicycle
- Swing Bike
