= Huffy =

Bicycle manufacturer and brand of Ohio, U.S.

Huffy Corporation
- Type: Privately held company
- Industry: Bicycles, Scooters, Battery Ride-On Toys
- Founded: 1892; 134 years ago
- Founder: George Huffman
- Headquarters: Miamisburg, Ohio, U.S.
- Key people: Bruno Maier (President and CEO)
- Parent: United Wheels
- Website: https://www.huffy.com

The Huffy Corporation is the largest U.S. market-share supplier of bicycles with its headquarters in Miamisburg, Ohio, United States.

== Early history ==
It has its roots in 1887 when George P. Huffman purchased the Davis Sewing Machine Company and in 1890 moved its sewing machine factory from Watertown, New York, to Dayton, Ohio. The Davis Sewing Machine Company made its first Dayton bicycle in Dayton, Ohio, in 1892. By 1897, they were the largest producer of bicycles in the United States.

In 1924, George's son, Horace M. Huffman Sr., founded the Huffman Manufacturing Company. From then until 1949, Huffman continued to manufacture and sell bicycles under the "Dayton" brand.

During the 1930s, Huffman participated in the revival of the American cycling industry, during which Horace Huffman commented on a "change of attitude". Although Huffman dabbled in the high-end of the market, they never overcame their entry-level reputation.

== Post-war history ==
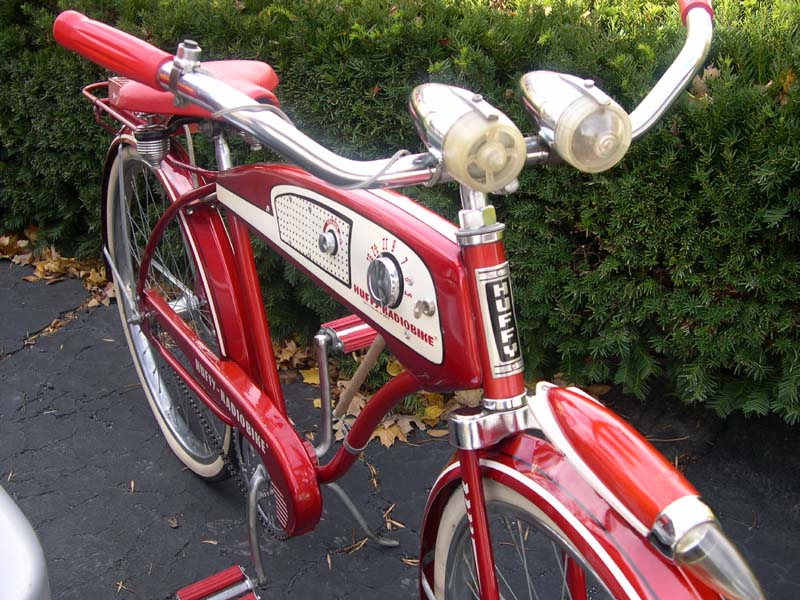
1955 Huffy Radio Bicycle

In 1949, Huffman developed the Huffy Convertible, which was a children's bicycle with rear training wheels and foot steps. The invention of the training wheels revolutionized the market for children's bicycles, and this was the first Huffman bicycle under the Huffy brand.

Also in 1949, Huffy started selling push and riding mowers. The company would eventually leave the market in 1975.

By 1953, a Huffy logo was created and Huffman switched all its bicycles to the Huffy brand. A few of the most popular models included the Special Roadster, the Racer, the LaFrance, and the Streamliner.

Seven years later in 1960, Huffman was the third largest bike manufacturer in the United States. Popular models produced during the heyday of the Huffy Corporation included the RadioBike, which had an electron-tube radio in the tank; the Scout, a 10-speed road bicycle; the Dragster, a so-called "wheelie bike"; and the Sigma, a BMX bike.

== Penguin and chopper bicycles ==
In 1962, Peter Mole of the John T. Bill & Co contacted Huffman with a concept for producing a bicycle based on a motorcycle, which he called the High Rise. Mole developed the bike based on heavily modified children's bicycles that were becoming popular with pre-teens in Southern California, and which mimicked the appearance of customized "chopper" motorcycles. The High Rise had a long banana seat with supporting struts and tall "ape-hanger" handlebars. Huffy hesitated for several months before agreeing to make the bike, on the condition that if the bike failed to sell that Mole would buy all the leftover parts and frames. The new bike, informally designated the Penguin, began appearing in retail stores by March 1963. The Penguin was the first of the banana-seat chopper bicycles to reach the U.S. market.

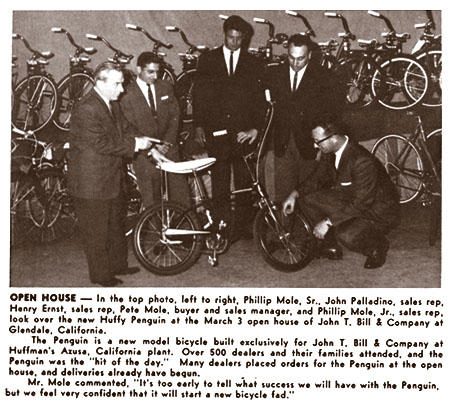
The Huffy Penguin introduction

In November 1964, Huffman Manufacturing Company ran an advertisement for their new Dragster model in Life Magazine, which claimed that Huffman was the first to manufacture a bicycle of the high-rise type.

In 1966, Huffman introduced a new long-wheelbase bicycle frame called the Rail. The new frame was approximately 4" to 5" longer than previous models. The new frame became Huffman's base model until 1968. In 1968, in an effort to market a children's bicycle with an automotive theme, Huffman designers added a car-type steering wheel in place of handlebars to the Rail frame, which became the Huffy Wheel. Tall "stick-shift" derailleur gear shift levers mounted on the frame top tube imitated the gearshift levers of popular muscle cars of the day, while many banana seat cycles were fitted with tall chromed sissy bar passenger backrests at the rear of the seat.

In mid-1968, Huffman released the Flaming Stack chain guard, which was designed to look like the distinctive side exhaust pipe covers on the Corvette sports car. Later that same year, Huffman released a new Slingshot model with 16" front dragster wheel, and 20" rear. The new 1969 models were the last year for the three-bar Rail frame style. In 1970, Huffman deleted their three-bar frame and went to a two-bar Rail frame, eventually adding additional two-tone fade paint jobs along with Persons striped seats. These designs continued in production until 1971 when new safety and manufacturing restrictions from the BMA (Bicycle Manufacturers Association), the Consumer Product Safety Commission (CPSC) and other U.S. federal agencies forced the discontinuance of the Wheel, the top-tube mounted "stick-shift", the "sissy bar", and many other stylized features of children's bicycle designs.

== Modern era ==
In 1970, the Huffy Corporation was founded as an umbrella company to house the Huffy Bicycle division, as well as Huffman Manufacturing Company's emerging sporting goods line. Huffman purchased YLCE (Yorba Linda Cycle Enterprises) and converted that Southern California company to a national service company, assembling bicycles and other products for mass merchants such as KMart, Target, Sears, and Walmart. Other divisions were purchased and added to the Huffman stable of companies, including Gerry Baby Products (Denver), Washington Inventory Service (San Diego), Raleigh Bicycle USA (Kent, Washington), and True Temper Garden Products (Pennsylvania).

In 1977, the company name was changed from Huffman Manufacturing Company to Huffy Corporation.

The growth of the corporation during the 1980s was significant and Huffy (HUF on the New York Stock Exchange) was nearly a Fortune 500 Company. In the 1984 and 1988 Summer Olympics, United States athletes riding Serotta-built bicycles racing under the Huffy brand won two gold medals, two silver medals, and one bronze medal. A technical development center housed in the Huffy Corporate Offices in Dayton, Ohio was formed to research and create next-generation carbon fiber road and time trial bicycles. It was led by Mike Melton and Steve Bishop, two legendary custom bicycle builders. Sponsorship of world class and professional cyclists was only partially effective, as famous teams and riders, such as Greg LeMond and the 7-Eleven team used the Huffy sponsorship for financial support while openly maligning the company and even using different bicycles for competition while sponsored by Huffy. The subsequent fallout in the cycling community was devastating to Huffy, but not surprising considering the nature of the athletes involved. Huffy spent $500,000 to be named the Official Bicycle of the 1996 World Cycling Championships, held in Colorado Springs, the first time the World Championships has been held in the United States.

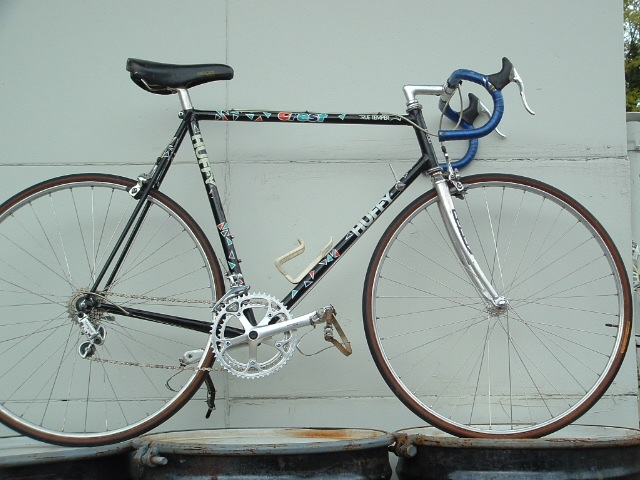
Huffy racing bicycle, frame built by Dennis Bushnell

Huffy Bicycles had manufacturing and assembly facilities in Azusa, California (closed in the late 1970s), and Ponca City Oklahoma (closed in the early 1980s), but largely manufactured most of their bicycles in Celina, Ohio, and at one time was Celina's largest employer. At their peak, the bicycle division manufactured over two million bicycles per year and was the largest bicycle manufacturing company outside of Asia.

By the mid 1990s, Huffy was in deep financial trouble. The U.S. Bicycle industry had consolidated, sharply reducing the number of channels for selling bikes. High-volume retailers had claimed three fourths of the U.S. market, gaining tremendous leverage over bicycle makers. Walmart in particular was pressuring Huffy: it ordered 900,000 bikes at one time, but insisted that Huffy lower its prices significantly. To remain a major player in the bicycle market, the Ohio company had little choice but to agree. Even with Huffy's other non-unionized manufacturing plants, it could not make a profit selling bicycles at the prices Walmart, its biggest customer, was willing to pay. After requesting and getting a pay cut for its unionized workforce in Ohio, Huffy returned to profitability for two years only to again crumple under the pricing pressure applied by Walmart. This forced Huffy to close its Celina, Ohio plant and lay off all 935 employees. Their other two factories in Missouri and Mississippi soon fell to the same fate for the same reason. Even after subcontracting production to China, where plant workers earned only 25 to 41 cents per hour, it remained unable to operate at a profit.

In 1996, the bicycle division received a major blow when U.S. courts ruled that surging imports of low-cost, mass-market bicycles from China did not pose a 'material threat' to the last three major U.S. bicycle manufacturers—Murray Inc., Roadmaster, and Huffy. Huffy closed its Celina, Ohio, plant in 1998, and quickly thereafter closed two smaller bicycle manufacturing plants (in Farmington, MO. and Southaven, MS.) which had been opened as a last-ditch effort to avoid the higher union manufacturing costs in Ohio. After it became apparent that continued U.S. production of low-cost, mass-market bicycles was no longer viable, Huffy had bicycles built by plants in Mexico and China, starting in 1999. The relationship with the Mexican plant was severed shortly thereafter. In a federal bankruptcy court in Dayton, Ohio, in 2004, Huffy's assets were turned over to its Chinese creditors. In 2004, Huffy sold its Huffy Sports division to Russell Corporation. Huffy Sports manufactured sporting goods, including the Hydra-Rib basketball systems used by the NBA. By 2006, Huffy had sold more than 100 million bicycles. After years of struggling against the cut-rate Chinese bicycles that set the price target guiding Walmart, Huffy essentially had become a Chinese-owned company.

In 1999, Ames acquired True Temper yard tools and golf shafts from Huffy.

The design, product development, and marketing (majority of all business functions) for Huffy is based in Miamisburg, Ohio, a suburb of Dayton. Manufacturing is based outside of the U.S. Crown Equipment Corporation now uses the former Huffy U.S. bicycle factory in Celina, Ohio, to produce forklifts.

== Financial problems and post-bankruptcy ==
On August 13, 2004, Huffy announced that its financial statements had accounting irregularities. The price of Huffy stock (Stock symbol: HUF) declined by 40 percent on the next NYSE trading day. On August 16, 2004, the NYSE suspended Huffy stock and removed it as a listed stock. Finally, on October 20, 2004, Huffy announced that the Huffy Corporation and all its United States and Canadian subsidiaries would file for bankruptcy protection under Chapter 11 of the United States Bankruptcy Code. The accounting irregularities included the corporate 'misuse' of pension funds. The pension program of Huffy Corp is now run by the U.S. federal government, under the Pension Benefit Guarantee Program. In 2005, the company restructured under a plan that transferred ownership to creditors, thereby discharging much of its debt.

Following its reorganization, Huffy continued operations. The business was reduced to its core focus of bicycles, and manufacturing shifted internationally prior to and following their bankruptcy. By the late 2010s, Huffy had undergone a time of rebuilding and expansion. The company adapted to changes in the industry while maintaining its focus on mass-market bicycles. Huffy expanded its products into additional categories, which included electric bicycles and battery-powered ride-on vehicles (BRO's) for children.

At the beginning of the 2020s, Huffy was operating as part of United Wheels Inc., a global holding company for cycling and recreation brands, including Huffy, Batch Bicycles, Niner, and Buzz Ebikes. In May 2026, United Wheels put a pause on the Niner and Buzz Ebike brands to strategically shift its focus on Huffy and Batch bicycles with plans to take advantage of new opportunities in global markets.

Grow Ride Move (GRM) is a line of kids' bikes introduced to Huffy in 2025. Revolving around the concept of developmental progression, GRM bikes support kids as they advance from beginner stages and work on balance to independent riding. It was launched in association with the "Move-Up" program, which aims to lower the cost of a larger model as children outgrow their current bike by offering a discounted path to larger sizes of the same line. The program is especially aimed at families buying multiple bikes for multiple kids as they grow.

== See also ==
- Kawasaki bicycles
