= Sissy bar =

Addition to the rear of a bicycle or motorcycle

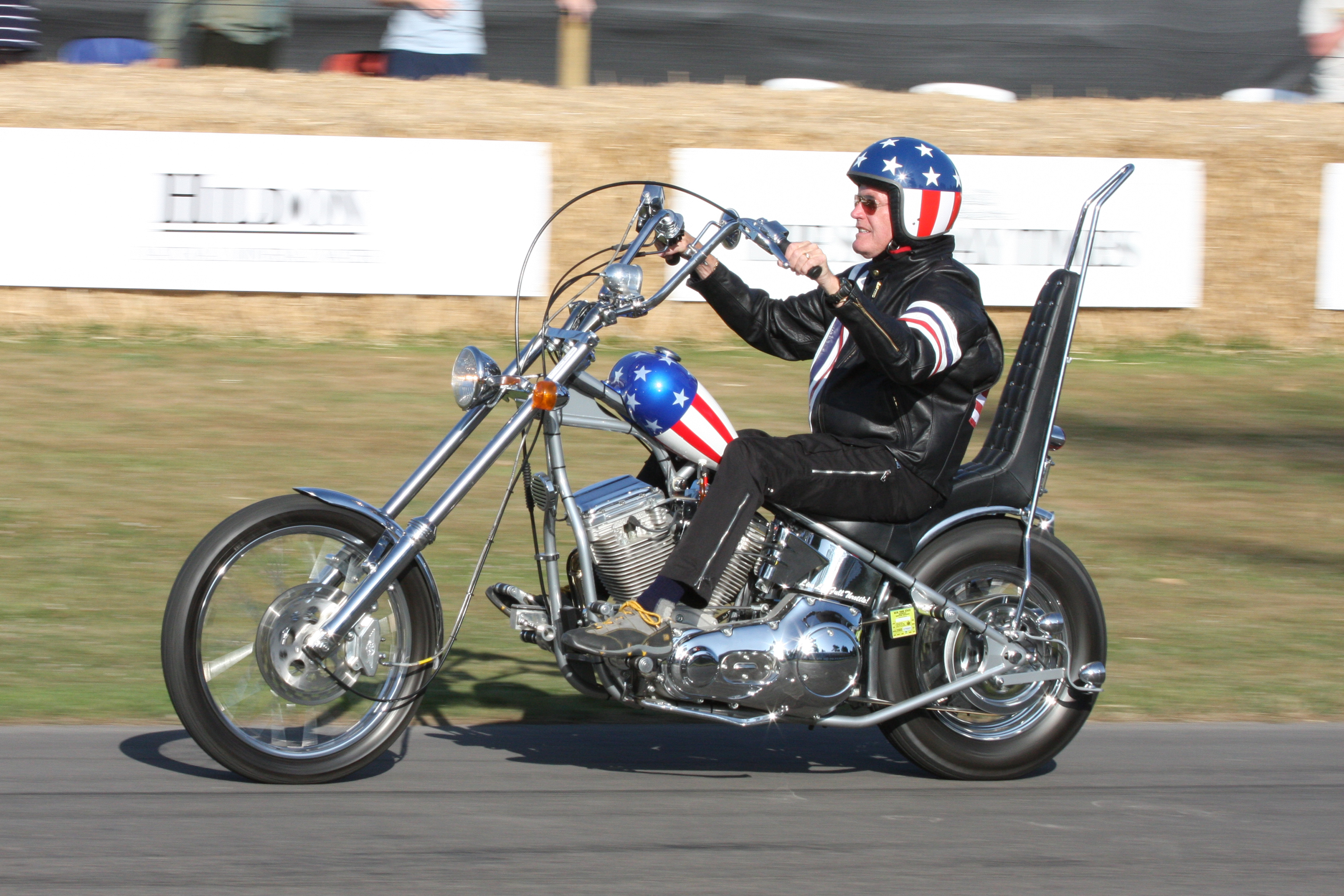
A tall sissy bar on a chopper

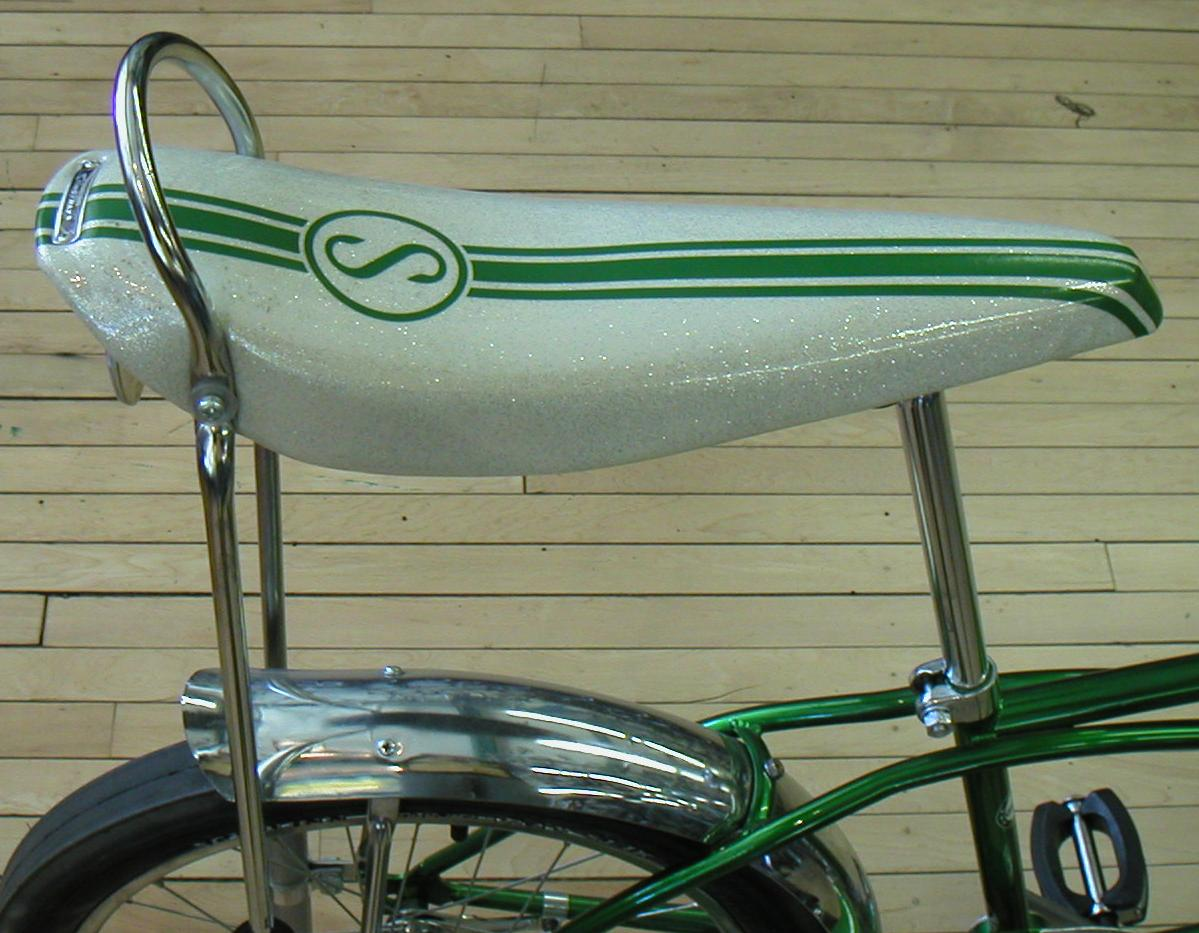
A sissy bar mounted on a Schwinn Sting-Ray bicycle

A sissy bar, also called a "sister bar" or "passenger backrest", is an addition to the rear of a bicycle or motorcycle that allows the rider or passenger to recline against it while riding. Alternatively, it can serve as an anchor point or support for mounting luggage or equipment that is not part of the bike. It can serve as one of the main mounts securing the rear fender to the motorcycle. Over the years, sissy bars have been a focal point of expression for the bike builder. Custom sissy bar designs can be simple or extravagant. They can be built for comfort, purpose, style or a combination of all three.

In the early 1960s, some states initiated laws that mandated the use of a bar on the back of a street motorcycle for safety reasons. At the time, bikers were not a group particularly concerned with safety, and started referring to the bars as "sissy" bars because they were not happy about having to comply with the new law. Some bikers began making excessively tall sissy bars as a form of protest, which later became part of the modern chopper look. A variety of materials were used to fabricate these custom sissy bar designs, such as tubing, wrought iron, plate metal, and even welded chain.

Sissy bars for cruiser-style motorcycles are usually affixed to the rear fender struts, and are typically made of chrome-plated steel with a foam padded seatback for comfort. Some elaborate custom examples can extend three feet or more. A backrest for a touring motorcycle is often shorter and less elaborate and may be built into a trunk.

== On bicycles ==
A smaller motorcycle-inspired version of the sissy bar that attached to the rear of a banana seat was a common feature on 1960s- and 70s-era wheelie bikes such as the Schwinn Sting-Ray and the Raleigh Chopper.
