= Patterson family =

American industrial, political and banking family

The Patterson family is a prominent family from North Carolina that was involved in politics and business for several generations, serving in the state and national level and founding successful companies, including the American Machine and Foundry Company.

== History ==
The Patterson family is a branch of the Lenoir family first made famous by Gen. William Lenoir, an American Revolutionary War officer and prominent statesman in late 18th-century and early 19th-century North Carolina. Both the City of Lenoir, North Carolina and Lenoir County, North Carolina are named for him. Lenoir City, Tennessee is jointly named for him and for his son, William Ballard Lenoir. A granddaughter of Gen. Lenoir, Phoebe Caroline Jones, married North Carolina politician Samuel F. Patterson, and began this branch of the prominent Patterson family. Their son, Rufus Lenoir Patterson, was mayor of Salem, North Carolina and sired Rufus Lenoir Patterson Jr., who founded American Machine and Foundry and served as a vice president of the American Tobacco Company. He moved to New York City in the 1890s where his children married into prominent New York society families. Rufus Jr.'s grandson, Herbert Parsons Patterson, served as president of the Chase Manhattan Bank.

== Members ==
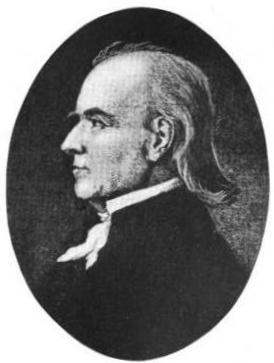
Gen. William Lenoir

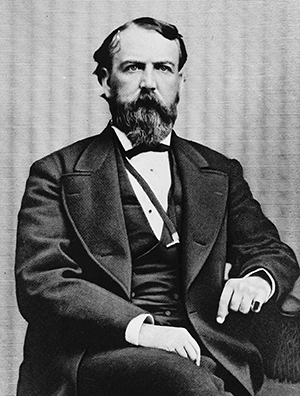
Rufus Lenoir Patterson

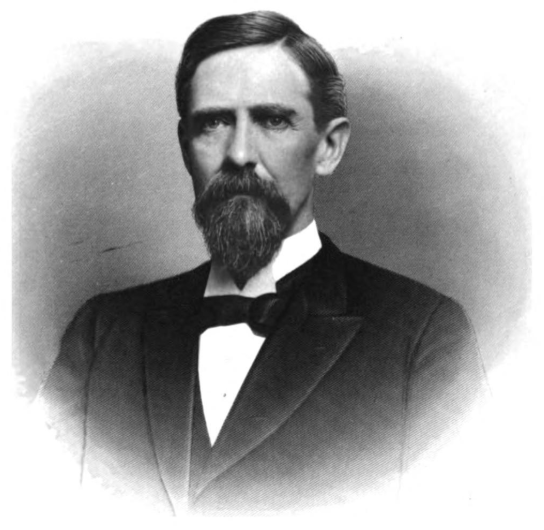
Samuel Legerwood Patterson

- William Lenoir (1751–1839) m. Ann Ballard (1751–1833)
  - Mary Lenoir Gordon (1772–1859) m. (1) 1790: Charles Gordon (1756–1799); (2) 1802: William Davenport (1770–1859)
    - William Ballard Lenoir (1775–1852) m. 1802: Elizabeth Avery (1781–1855) (daughter of Waightstill Avery)
      - Isaac Thomas Lenoir (1807–1875) m. Mary Caroline Hogg (1812–1877) (daughter of Samuel E. Hogg)
      - Waightstill Avery Lenoir (1815–1884) m. Isabella Jane Hume (1828–1857)
  - Ann Lenoir (1778–1838) m. Edmund Jones (1771–1844)
    - Phoebe Caroline Jones (1806–1869) m. Samuel Finley Patterson (1799–1874)
      - Rufus Lenoir Patterson (1830–1879) m. (1) 1852: Marie Louise Morehead (1830–1862) (daughter of Gov. John Motley Morehead); (2) 1864: Mary Elizabeth Fries (1844–1927)
        - Caroline Finley Patterson (1856–1931), m. (1) 1883: Albert Lucian Coble (1918); (2) 1925: George Leander Frazier
        - Jesse Lindsay Patterson (1858–1922), m. Lucy Bramlette Patterson
        - Latitia Walker Patterson (1860–1884), m. Francis Henry Fries
        - Francis Fries Patterson (1865–1933), m. 1895: Ethel Mary Thomas
        - Samuel Finley Patterson (1867–1926), m. (div. 1901) Bessie Alexander; (2) 1914: Nancy Pearson
        - Andrew Henry Patterson (1870–1928), m. 1897: Eleanor Spurrier Alexander (daughter of Eben Alexander)
        - Rufus Lenoir Patterson Jr. (1872–1943), m. Margaret Warren Morehead
          - Morehead Patterson (1897–1962) m. (1) 1921 (div. 1929): Elsie Parsons (1901–1966) (daughter of Herbert Parsons and Elsie Clews Parsons); (2) 1945: Helen Isabelle Mitchell (1909–1955); (3) 1956: Margaret Morgan Tilt (1903–1996)
            - Rufus Lenoir Patterson III (1922–1944) m. 1942: Mae Gouverneur Cadwalader
              - Rufus Lenoir Patterson IV (1944–1964)
            - Herbert Parsons Patterson (1925–1985) m. (1) 1949: Louise Sargent Oakey McVeigh (1925–1968); (2) 1970: Patricia Shepard Norris (ex-wife of Bruce A. Norris) He was a member of the Racquet and Tennis Club and the Lenox Club.
              - Katheryn Clews Patterson, m. 1979: Thomas L. Kempner Jr. (b. 1953)
          - Lucy Lathrop Patterson (1900–1977), m. 1919: Casimir de Rham (1896–1968)
            - Casimir De Rham (1924–2011) m. 1945: Elizabeth Evarts (1926–2008)
            - David Patterson de Rham (1931–1995) m. Rachael Thompson (1933–2016)
        - John Legerwood Patterson (1874–1935), m. Margaret Newman (daughter of William Truslow Newman)
        - Edmond Vogler Patterson (1878–1934), m. 1907: Helene Trimble
      - Samuel Legerwood Patterson (1850–1918) m. 1873: Mary Sophia Senseman (1849–1909)
  - Thomas Lenoir (1780–1861) m. 1807: Selena Louisa Avery (1788–1864) (daughter of Waightstill Avery)
  - Martha "Patsy" Lenoir (1792–1823) m. Israel Pickens (1780–1827)
    - Julia A. Pickens (1815–1898) m. C. S. Howe
    - Israel Leonidas Pickens (1820–1888) m. Eliza Ann Nelson (1825–1850)

== Morehead-Patterson Bell Tower ==
In the 1920s, Rufus L. Patterson Jr. and his college classmate and fraternity brother, John Motley Morehead III (who was also a first cousin of his wife), funded the $100,000 construction cost of the Morehead-Patterson Bell Tower, a bell tower designed by McKim, Mead & White and located on the campus of The University of North Carolina at Chapel Hill. It was initially built to commemorate the NC State alumni that fell during World War I. The Tower was dedicated in November 1931.

== See also ==
- Gilded Age
- Lenoir Cotton Mill
