= Hugo Friedrich Fries =

German judge, politician and lawyer

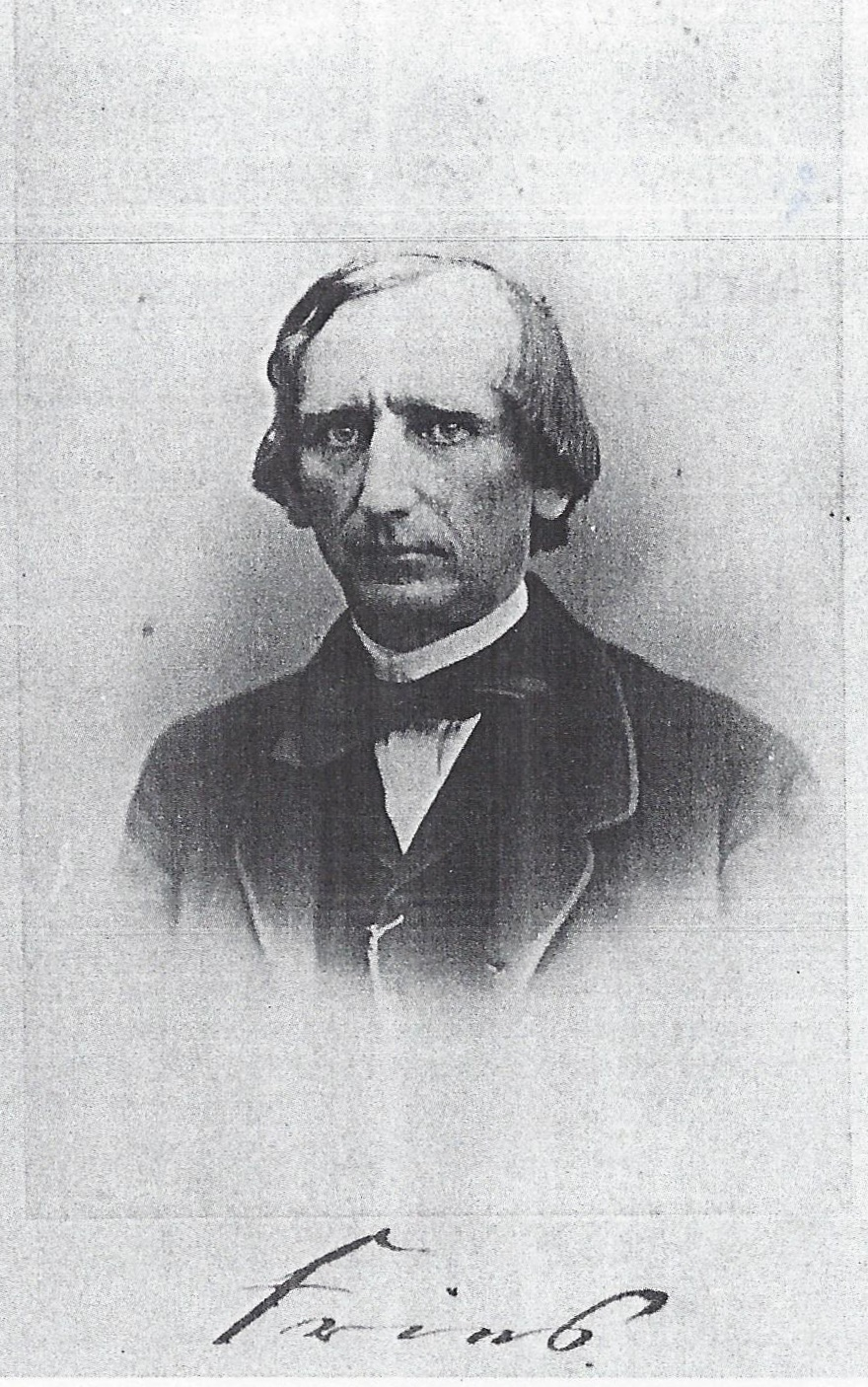
- Fries, c. 1870

Mayor of Bad Berka
- In office 1848–1850

Chairman of the Municipal Council of Weimar
- In office 1862–1874

President of the Landtag of Thuringia
- In office 1865–1889

Personal details
- Born: 9 January 1818 Jena, German Confederation
- Died: 25 March 1889 (aged 71) Weimar, German Empire
- Party: National Liberal Party
- Parent: Jakob Friedrich Fries (father)
- Relatives: Wilhelm von Henke (nephew); Francis Henry Fries (first cousin once removed); Rufus L. Patterson Jr. (first cousin twice removed); Morehead Patterson (first cousin thrice removed); Herbert Parsons Patterson (first cousin four times removed)
- Education: University of Göttingen; University of Jena
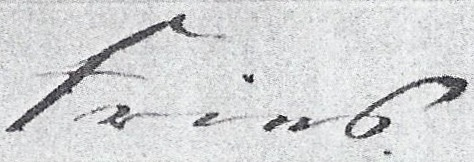
- Signature

Hugo Friedrich Fries (/friːs/; German: [fʁiːs]; 9 January 1818 – 25 March 1889). sometimes spelt Frieze, was a German judge, and son of Jakob Friedrich Fries. Before and after the founding of the German Reich, he was a member of the Reichstag. His son, Otto Fries (1849–1905), a forester, was also a member of the Reichstag.

== Life ==
Fries studied law at the University of Göttingen and the University of Jena (1837–1840). After graduating, he joined the civil service of the Grand Duchy of Saxe-Weimar-Eisenach. He was a lawyer in Berka from 1845 to 1850, and became its mayor from 1848 to 1850. He then moved to Weimar in 1850 and continued working there as a lawyer, later becoming a member of the municipal council in 1853. He become one of the founders of the German National Association in 1859. He became a member of the National Liberal Party of Germany from 1870 onwards.

He was a member of the Thuringian Landtag and became its president from 1865 to 1889. In February 1867 he arrived in the Reichstag (North German Confederation) and the Customs Parliament. From the general election in 1871 until the general election in 1874 he sat for the National Liberal Party in Reichstag. He was a representative of the constituency Weimar 1 (Weimar-Apolda).

== Honors ==
- Honorary citizen of Weimar (1874)
- Honorary citizen of Bad Berka (1886)

== Sources ==
- Helge Dvorak: Biographical Dictionary of the German fraternity. Volume I: Politicians. Subchapter 7: Supplement A-K. Winter, Heidelberg 2013, ISBN 978-3-8253-6050-4, pp. 341–342
- Hermann Kalkoff (ed.): National Liberal parliamentarians 1867-1917 of the Reichstag and the Einzellandtage. Scripture Distribution Office of the National Liberal Party of Germany, Berlin 1917 (with picture)
- Bernd Haunfelder, Klaus Erich Pollmann : Reichstag of the North German Confederation 1867-1870. Historical Photographs and Biographical Handbook (= Photographic Documents on the History of Parliamentarism and Political Parties, Volume 2). Droste, Düsseldorf 1989, ISBN 3-7700-5151-3 (with picture).
