= Murray (bicycle company) =

Defunct American manufacturer of bikes and lawn equipment

Murray was an American company founded in 1919 that made bicycles and lawn and garden equipment. The corporate brand is a descendant of the Murray Ohio Manufacturing Company. The company went bankrupt in 2005 selling most of its assets to Briggs & Stratton and Pacific Cycle, the latter of which was itself later acquired by Pon Holdings.

== History ==
=== Bicycle manufacturing ===
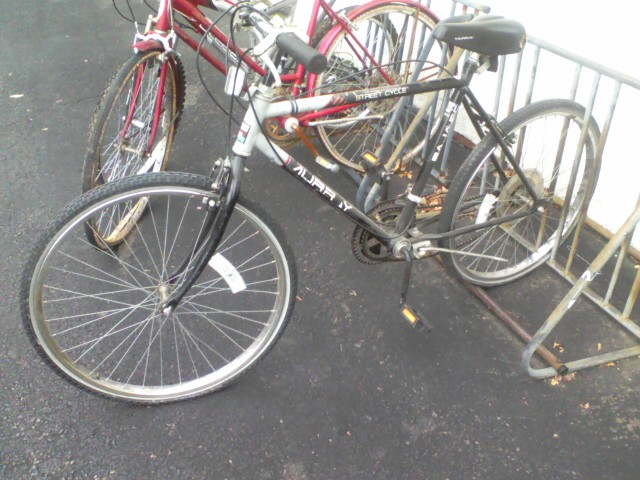
Murray Roadster

Murray Ohio Manufacturing Company was founded in 1919 to make fenders, fuel tanks, and other automobile parts. The company was founded in Cleveland, Ohio, and the Cleveland factory was unionized by the United Auto Workers (UAW) and AFL–CIO. In the mid-1930s, the company began production of bicycles, mostly for the youth market. Other products included pedal cars and electric fans. Until 1939, Murray manufactured all of its products for branding and sale by other manufacturers, especially Sears, Roebuck & Co. From 1939 through 1942, Murray made the body parts for the Crosley automobile.

In 1939, Murray introduced its Pacemaker Series Mercury bicycle at the 1939 New York World's Fair. Styled by the industrial artist and designer Viktor Schreckengost, the streamlined machine, with an elaborate diecast metal headpiece, was finished in black, chrome, and polished aluminum, the deluxe version of the Mercury Pacemaker line. Consequently, the Mercury was an expensive bicycle, and sales were few. It was produced only in limited numbers, and in 1942, World War II stopped consumer bicycle production.

After the war, Murray became known as a manufacturer of low-cost bicycles and placed its own brand on some products. Since the 1930s, Murray had been producing bicycles that, while stylistically different, imitated designs by other U.S. manufacturers, including Schwinn and American Machine and Foundry (AMF). This occasionally brought Murray into legal conflict with competitors, as when Schwinn filed against Murray for duplicating a Schwinn knurling and machining process on its rims.

Most Murray bicycles were for the youth market, often featuring one-piece steel Ashtabula cranksets and internally brazed frames using inexpensive seamed or straight-gauge steel tubing. These low-cost parts and materials undercut the prices of Murray's competition, selling millions of bicycles (often with retailer names) to department stores, hardware stores, and general retailers. Schrekengost styled more than 100 mostly youth bicycles for Sears, Western Auto, Firestone Tire, and other retailers, including the Spaceliner, Western Flyer, and Firestone. By modifying chain guards, luggage carriers, lighting, handlebars, and truss rods, Schrekengost gave each bicycle a distinctive look while retaining the same welded tube frame design.

Like its competitor AMF, Murray left Cleveland in the 1950s and moved its factory and assembly plant to the American South, choosing a factory site in Lawrenceburg, Tennessee, with corporate headquarters in Brentwood, Tennessee. Originally a non-union plant, the Lawrenceburg facility began operations in 1956, and over the next few decades, the complex grew to become one of the largest facilities of its type in the United States: 42.7 acres (173,000 m^{2}) under roof. The Teamsters lost a NLRB election in March 1965; they charged unfair labor practices and proceeded to lead a 46-day strike that halted production. On April 12, fifty workers were arrested as the company resumed production. Police locked arms as they protected 1350 workers who drove into the facility. Two picketers were hospitalized, one struck by the car of a non-union worker, one injured by the police. A court declared their pickets illegal, and Tennessee state troopers were brought to the factory to stop picketing by striking workers on April 19. The company could not resume production that day because a sniper had sabotaged an electrical transformer. The next day the state troopers were initially rebuffed by striking workers, before moving against them again and then clearing a path for the replacement workers. Nine picketers were arrested and charged with disorderly conduct. Two hundred marched from the factory to the jail singing "we shall not be moved" after the arrests. The next day about 60 workers were arrested by state troopers. Scores of state troopers were still guarding the facility on May 12 when two explosions went off near the facility that reporters linked to the conflict. Some of those arrested were transported to jail in a state highway department dump truck. It later became a UAW plant (1991), and produced both bicycles and lawn and garden equipment. One of its more famous former employees is former Senator Fred D. Thompson.

Youth bicycle production received a boost with the 1965 introduction of Murray's version of the small-tired, banana-seat, wheelie bike pioneered by Schwinn, the Murray Wildcat. The Wildcat was also styled by Schreckengost, who gave it his own interpretation of a chopper motorcycle, with high-rise handlebars, a tall sissy bar, and a flared rear fender. A series of models followed, including the Eliminator, Firecat and Hotshot. In 1977, again following a youth trend, Murray introduced its BMX model.

During the 1980s, due to declining sales, Murray began selling its bicycle line in lower-cost mass market stores and discount chains such as Target, K-Mart, Woolworth, and Wal-Mart. While sales of overall units increased, profits failed to meet expectations as a result of reduced margins imposed by mass retailers. Additionally, many independent bicycle dealers (IBDs) resented the new competition, and in retaliation some dealers refused to stock or promote Murray bicycles.

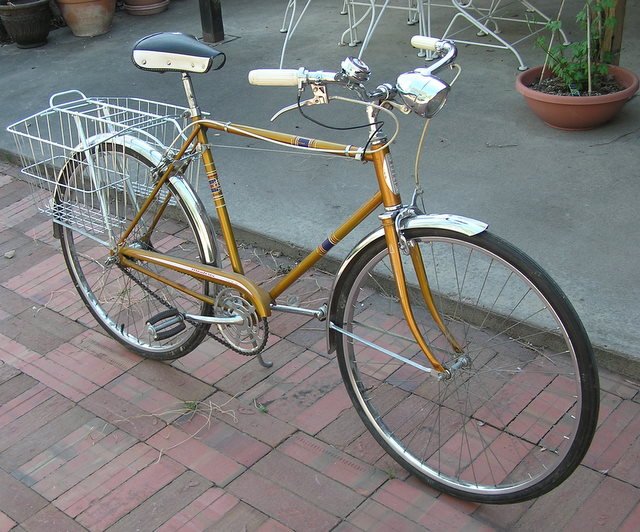
Murray 3-speed bicycle

In June 1988, the Murray Ohio Manufacturing Company was acquired by the British investment group Tomkins plc. In 1996, Murray Inc., one of the last major U.S. bicycle producers along with Huffy Bicycles and Roadmaster (formerly AMF), received a major blow when U.S. courts ruled that imports from China were not a "material threat" to U.S. companies. Within three years, Huffy, Roadmaster and Murray ceased manufacture of bicycles in the United States.

In 1998, Murray moved bicycle production from Lawrenceburg to a non-union factory in Mississippi. Production of all U.S.-made bicycles halted in 1999. In 2000, the Murray brand was acquired by Pacific Cycle, a U.S. distributor of bicycles produced in Taiwan an Mainland China. Murray has since been used as a brand for imported Chinese bicycles sold by Pacific Cycle. Pacific Cycle was later acquired by Dorel Industries, and then Pon Holdings.

=== Lawn and garden equipment ===
Murray also manufactured lawn and garden equipment. In June 1988, Murray was acquired by Tomkins plc of Great Britain. In 1993, the new company purchased the Noma brand of lawn and garden equipment. It manufactured under a variety of brands, including for other companies. Murray made all "502" and "536" model prefix product that was sold under the Craftsman name at Sears. (AMF and Western Tool, which were absorbed by Murray, made "536" product as well). Murray licensed the Stanley brand and produced lawn and garden mowers and snow blowers sold at Wal-Mart and other retailers. The machines were built at the former bicycle facility in Lawrenceburg.

The Murray brand was acquired by Briggs & Stratton in 2004. On August 30, 2005, Lawrenceburg produced its last lawnmower, closing on September 30, 2005.

=== Brands owned by Murray ===
- AMF (American Machine & Foundry)
- Dynamark
  - Dynamark Plus
- Murray
  - Murray Classic
  - Murray Performance (Sold at Mills Fleet Farm and AAFES (Army & Air Force Exchange Service))
  - Murray Pro
  - Murray Select
  - Murray Ultra
  - Murray 2000
- Noma
  - Noma Cady Plus
  - Noma Performance
  - Noma Signature Series
- Sentinel (sold in Europe)
- Stanley (under license)
- TurfMaster (sold in Meijer stores)
- Ultra
- Yard King
  - Yard King Elite
  - Yard King Performance

=== Brands built by Murray ===
- Agway
- AL-KO
- Bertsche
- Bestgreen
- Cast
- Dynastar
- Eaglestar
- Ering
- Eumot
- Flandria
- Granja
- Hako
- JardiPro
- JC Penney
- Lawn General
- Lowe's
- Masport
- NESI
- PowerPro (for Kmart)
- Quality (for Quality Farm & Fleet)
  - Quality Pro
- Ronz
- Scott's (sold at Home Depot)
- Sentar (for Univert)
- Statesman (for Southern States Cooperative)
- Tempo-Trac
- Texas
- TTI
- Turbogreen
- Unilux
- Uniropa
- Victa
- Wizard (for Western Auto)

== Financial status ==
- 1988: Murray was purchased by Tomkins PLC of Great Britain.
- 2000: purchased by Summersong Investment, a Chinese-backed company.
- 2004: Filed bankruptcy, whereupon engine manufacturer Briggs & Stratton acquired the Murray brand name for use on lawn equipment. Briggs & Stratton also owns Simplicity Outdoor.
