= Johann Severin Vater =

German theologian (1771–1826)

Johann Severin Vater (German: [ˈfaːtɐ]; May 27, 1771, Altenburg – March 16, 1826, Halle) was a German theologian, biblical scholar, and linguist.

== Biography ==
He was a student and professor at Jena and Halle. In 1809, he became professor at Königsberg. In 1820, he resumed his chair at Halle. Although he taught theology, he is chiefly known as a philologist.

In 1817, Vater was elected a member of the American Philosophical Society. In 1821, he was elected a member of the American Antiquarian Society.

== Work ==
Following Alexander Geddes, he applied the fragmentary hypothesis to the whole of the Pentateuch, treating it as an aggregate of numerous minor documents that had been compiled together. Vater's major work, Commentar über den Pentateuch was published in three volumes in Halle between 1802 and 1806. This work's primary purpose was to advance the Supplementary Hypothesis against the earlier Documentarian endeavors of Jean Astruc, Johann Gottfried Eichhorn, and Karl David Ilgen. Many of Vater's conclusions – most prominently, his assertion of the late nature of the Pentateuch as compared to the historical books – mirror the independent work of Wilhelm Martin Leberecht de Wette, whose Beiträge zur Einleitung in das Alte Testament was published in 1806–7. Against de Wette, though, Vater supposed, based on historical book allusions to Deuteronomy, that at least some parts of Deuteronomy had existed prior to the collection of the Pentateuch.

== Writings ==
Besides the Commentar, his works include:

- Hebrew grammar (1797)
- Handbuch der hebräischen, syrischen, chaldäischen und arabischen Grammatik (1801)
- Polish grammar (1807)
- Russian grammar (1809)
- Continuation of Adelung's Mithridates (1809–17)
- Literatur der Grammatiken, Lexika und Wörtersammlungen aller Sprachen der Erde (1815)

He also edited and continued Henke's Allgemeine Geschichte der christlichen Kirche (1818–23).
