= Wilhelm Martin Leberecht de Wette =

German theologian and biblical scholar

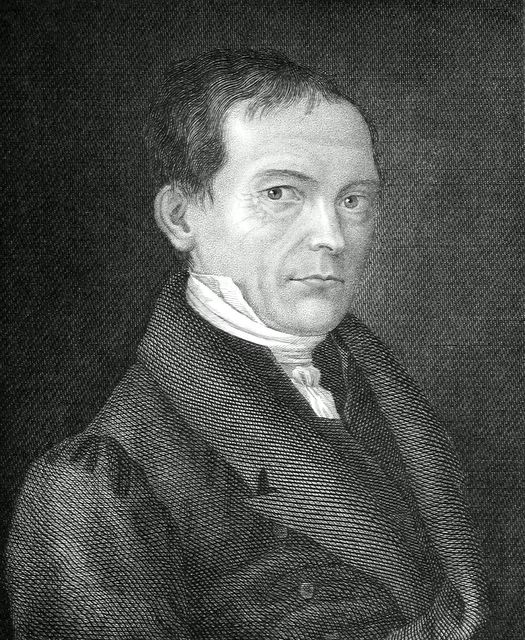
W. M. L. de Wette

Wilhelm Martin Leberecht de Wette (12 January 1780 – 16 June 1849) was a German Lutheran theologian and biblical scholar.

== Life and education ==
Wilhelm Martin Leberecht de Wette was born on 12 January 1780 in Ulla (now part of the municipality of Nohra), Saxe-Weimar, where his father was a pastor. As a boy, he was sent to the gymnasium at the nearby city of Weimar. Here he was much influenced by Johann Gottfried von Herder, who frequently examined at the school. In 1799, de Wette entered the University of Jena to study theology, his principal teachers being J. J. Griesbach and H. E. G. Paulus. By the time he submitted his doctoral dissertation in 1805, he was in regular contact at Jena with Jakob Friedrich Fries and Karl David Ilgen, who perhaps led him to his contact with Johann Severin Vater, a scholar whose work he both admired and, in some respects, duplicated independently. He became a Privatdozent at Jena after completing his doctorate degree.

In 1807, de Wette became a professor of theology at Heidelberg, where he came under the influence of Jakob Friedrich Fries, whose hiring he helped arrange (as well as that of Paulus). In 1810, was transferred to a similar chair in the newly founded Friedrich Wilhelm University in Berlin, where he became friendly with Friedrich Schleiermacher. He was, however, dismissed from Berlin in 1819 on account of his having written a letter of consolation to the mother of Karl Ludwig Sand, the murderer of August Friedrich Ferdinand von Kotzebue. A petition in his favour presented by the senate of the university was unsuccessful, and a decree was issued not only depriving him of the chair, but also banishing him from the Kingdom of Prussia.

De Wette retired to Weimar, where he occupied his leisure in the preparation of his edition of Martin Luther and in writing the romance Theodor oder die Weihe des Zweiflers (1822), in which he describes the education of an evangelical pastor. He began preaching, at which he proved to be very popular. In 1822, he accepted the chair of theology in the University of Basel, which had been reorganized four years before. Though his appointment had been strongly opposed by the orthodox party, De Wette soon won for himself great influence both in the university and among the people generally. He was admitted a citizen and became rector of the university, which owed to him much of its recovered strength, particularly in the theological faculty.

== Marriages and family ==
De Wette married three times; first in 1805 to Eberhardine Boye, then in 1809 to a widow, Henriette Beck, the mother of Charles Beck, and the third time in 1833 to Sophie Streckeisen, widow of the Berne pastor Abraham Rudolf von May.

== Studies ==
In his 1805 doctoral dissertation, de Wette proposed that the "book of law" discovered in the temple by the priest Hilkiah as described in 2 Kings 22 was the Book of Deuteronomy. The suggestion has been described by Julius Wellhausen as "the epoch-making opener of the historical criticism of the Pentateuch" which prepared the way for the supplementary hypothesis. But he also made valuable contributions to other branches of theology. He had, moreover, considerable poetic faculty, and wrote a drama in three acts, entitled Die Entsagung (Berlin, 1823). He had an intelligent interest in art, and studied ecclesiastical music and architecture. As a Biblical critic he was sometimes classed with the "destructive school" (an older polemical label used by some 19th-century writers for strands of German rationalist theology) but, as Otto Pfleiderer says (Development of Theology), he "occupied as free a position as the Rationalists with regard to the literal authority of the creeds of the church, but that he sought to give their due value to the religious feelings, which the Rationalists had not done, and, with a more unfettered mind towards history, to maintain the connection of the present life of the church with the past." His works are marked by exegetical skill, unusual power of condensation and uniform fairness. Accordingly, they possess value that is little affected by the progress of criticism.

== Death ==
De Wette died in Basel on 16 June 1849.

== Selected works ==
His most important works are:

- Beiträge zur Einleitung in das Alte Testament (Contributions to the Introduction of the Old Testament. 2 vols, 1806–1807).
- Kommentar über die Psalmen (Commentary on the Psalms. 1811), which has passed through several editions.
- Lehrbuch der hebräisch-jüdischen Archäologie (Textbook of Hebrew-Jewish Archaeology. 1814).
- Über Religion und Theologie (On Religion and Theology. 1815); a work showing its author's general theological positions.
- Lehrbuch der christlichen Dogmatik (Textbook of Christian Dogmatics. 1813-1816).
- Lehrbuch der historisch-kritischen Einleitung in die Bibel (Textbook of the Historical-Critical Introduction to the Bible. 1817).
- Christliche Sittenlehre (Christian Moral Teaching. 1819–1821).
- Einleitung in das Neue Testament (Introduction to the New Testament. 1826).
- Religion, ihr Wesen, ihre Erscheinungsform, und ihr Einfluss auf das Leben (Religion, its nature, its appearance, and its influence on life. 1827).
- Das Wesen des christlichen Glaubens (The Essence of the Christian Faith. 1846).
- Kurzgefasstes exegetisches Handbuch zum Neuen Testament (Concise Exegetical Handbook on the New Testament. 1836–1848).

De Wette also edited Luther's works (5 vols., 1825–1828).

Selected works online

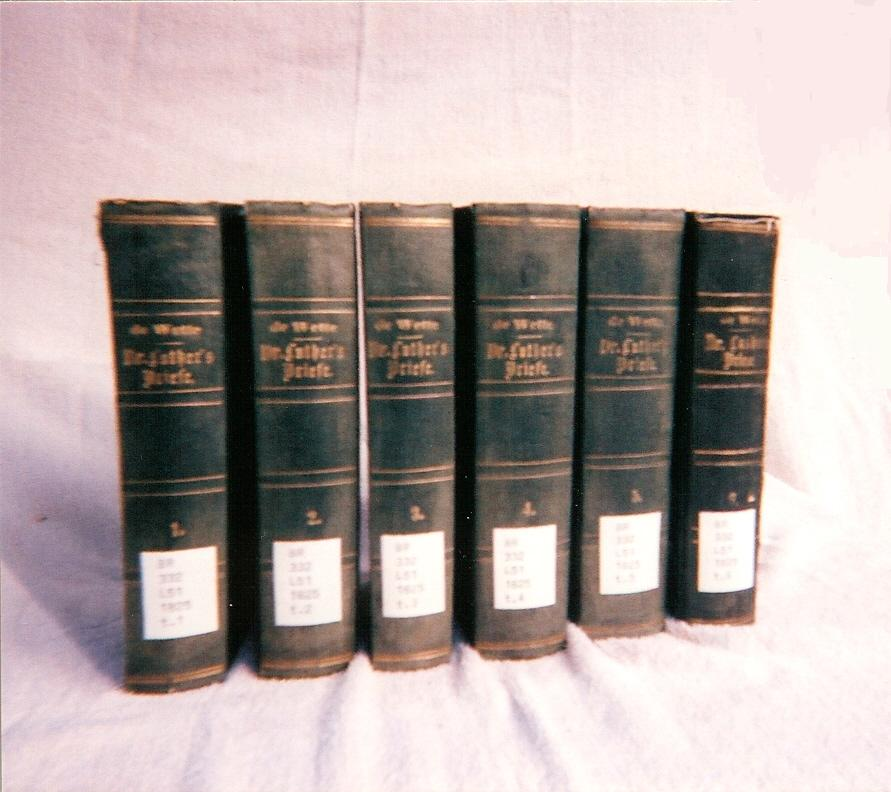
Volumes 1-6 of Luther's Briefe, Sendschreiben, und Bedenken, i.e. Letters, Open Letters, and considerations, ed. by De Wette-Seidemann

From Google Books:

- Dr. Martin Luthers Briefe, Sendschreiben und Bedenken: vollständig aus den verschiedenen Ausgaben seiner Werke und Briefe, aus andern Büchern und noch unbenutzten Handschriften gesammelt, kritisch und historisch bearbeitet, 5 vols., Berlin: Georg reimer, vol. 6, ed. by Johann Karl Seidemann - German (Fraktur) and Latin. Reviewed here (July 1845), books.google.com
- vol. 1, Erster Theil, 1825
- vol. 2, Zwenter Theil, 1826
- vol. 3, Dritter Theil, 1827
- vol. 4, Vierter Theil, 1827
- vol. 5, Fünfter Theil, 1828
- vol. 6, Sechster Theil, 1856
- Lehrbuch der historisch-kritischen Einleitung in die Bibel Alten und Neuen Testamentes, Erster Theil, Berlin: Georg Reimer, 1852
- Commentar über die Psalmen nebst beigefügter Übersetzung, fünfte auflage, herausgegeben von Dr. Gustav Baur, Professor der Theologie an der Universität Giessen, Akademische Verlagshandlung, Heidelberg, 1811, 1856, which passed through several editions, and was long regarded as of high authority.
- An Historico-Critical Introduction to the Canonical Books of the New Testament, Frederick Frothingham, tr., Boston: Crosby, Nichols and Company, 1858
- Lehrbuch der hebräisch-jüdischen Archäologie nebst einem Grundrisse der hebräisch-jüdischen Geschichte, 4th edition, Leipzig: F.C.W. Vogel, 1864
- Christliche Sittenlehre , Berlin, 1819
