= Roadmaster =

Roadmaster may refer to:

- Roadmaster (loudspeaker) a brand of loudspeaker in Indonesia
- Buick Roadmaster, an automobile produced by Buick 1936–1958 and 1991–1996
- Roadmaster (bicycles) a brand of Pacific Cycle
- Roadmaster (album), a 1973 album and title track by Gene Clark
- Roadmaster (rail), a type of railroad maintenance official
- Roadmaster (band), in which Toby Myers and Steve Riley played

== See also ==
- AEC Routemaster, a double decker bus
