= Julius Wegscheider =

German Protestant theologian (1771-1849)

- Born: Julius August Ludwig Wegscheider; 27 September 1771; Küblingen, Kingdom of Prussia, Holy Roman Empire
- Died: 27 January 1849 (aged 77); Halle, Kingdom of Prussia, Holy Roman Empire
- Education: University of Helmstedt
- Theological work
- Language: German

Julius August Ludwig Wegscheider (27 September 1771 – 27 January 1849), was a German Protestant theologian.

== Life ==
Wegscheider was born at Küblingen (now a part of Schöppenstedt, Lower Saxony). He studied theology at the University of Helmstedt, where he was a pupil of Heinrich Philipp Konrad Henke. From 1795 to 1805, he worked as a tutor to the family of a wealthy Hamburg merchant. In 1805 he presented a dissertation titled Graecorum mysteriis religioni non obtrudendis at the University of Göttingen. He then served as a professor of theology at the University of Rinteln (1806–1810), and at the University of Halle from 1810 onwards.

Wegscheider was a leading figure of dogmatic theological rationalism—for instance, he considered supernatural revelation to be an impossibility. Because of his rationalist teachings, he, along with his colleague Wilhelm Gesenius, were attacked by followers of Supernaturalism, creating a situation that led to a government investigation (1830). Ultimately, he retained his office at Halle, but lost his former influence.

== Principal works ==
- Über die von der neuesten Philosophie geforderte Trennung der Moral von der Religion, 1804 – On the latest philosophy requiring separation of morality from religion.
- Versuch einer vollständigen Einleitung in das Evangelium Johannis, 1806 – Attempt of a complete introduction to the Gospel of John.
- Institutiones theologicae dogmaticae, 1815; to which Wilhelm Steiger's Kritik des Rationalismus in Wegscheiders Dogmatik (1830) was a reply.

=== Books about Wegscheider ===
- "Leben und Werk des Hallenser Theologen Julius Wegscheider (1771–1849) : mit unveröffentlichten Briefen an Eduard Reuss"; by Jean Marcel Vincent, Waltrop : Spenner, 1997. Series: Wissen und Kritik, Bd. 13.
