= Ernst Ludwig Theodor Henke =

German theologian and historian

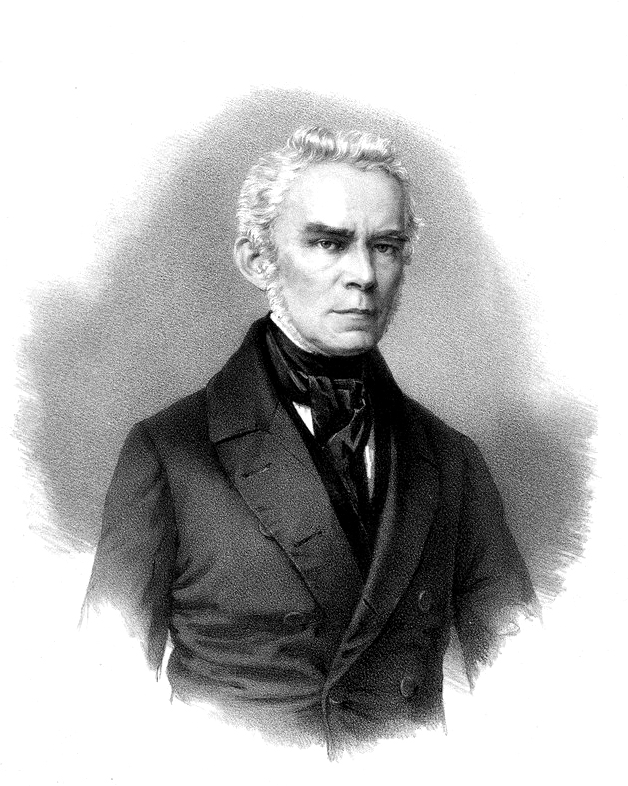
Ernst Ludwig Theodor Henke

Ernst Ludwig Theodor Henke (22 February 1804 in Helmstedt – 1 December 1872 in Marburg), was a German theologian and historian, and the son of the theologian Heinrich Henke (1752–1809). He was the father of anatomist Wilhelm von Henke (1834–1896).

From 1820, he studied at the Collegium Carolinum in Braunschweig, then continued his education at the Universities of Göttingen and Jena, where he was influenced by his later father-in-law Jakob Friedrich Fries (1773–1843) and Ludwig Baumgarten-Crusius (1788–1843). In 1826 he received his doctorate of philosophy, later returning to Braunschweig, where he taught classes at the Collegium Carolinum. In 1833 he was appointed an associate professor of church history and exegesis at Jena, followed by a full professorship at the University of Marburg (1839).

== Literary works ==
- Georg Calixtus und seine Zeit, 1833 - Georg Calixtus and his life.
- Papst Pius VII, 1860 - Pope Pius VII.
- Konrad von Marburg : Beichtvater der heiligen Elisabeth und Inquisitor, 1861 - Konrad of Marburg, Confessor of St. Elizabeth and Inquisitor.
- Caspar Peucer und Nicolaus Krell : zur Geschichte des Lutherthums und der Union am Ende des 16. Jahrhunderts, 1865 - Caspar Peucer and Nikolaus Krell, the history of Lutheranism and the Union at the end of the 16th Century.
- Jakob Friedrich Fries : aus seinem handschriftlichen Nachlasse, 1867 - Jakob Friedrich Fries, from his handwritten collections.
- Zur neuern Kirchengeschichte : akademische Reden und Vorlesungen, 1867 - More recent church history; academic speeches and lectures.
- Johann Hus und die Synode von Constanz, 1869 - John Hus and the Synod of Constanz.
