= Jakob Friedrich Fries =

German philosopher and mathematician (1773–1843)

- Born: 23 August 1773; Barby, Principality of Anhalt-Zerbst, Holy Roman Empire
- Died: 10 August 1843 (aged 69); Jena, Saxe-Weimar-Eisenach, German Confederation
- Children: 8, including Hugo Friedrich
- Relatives: Wilhelm von Henke (grandson); Francis Henry Fries (great-nephew); Rufus L. Patterson Jr. (second great-nephew); Morehead Patterson (third great-nephew); Herbert Parsons Patterson (fourth great-nephew)

Education
- Education: University of Leipzig; University of Jena
- Academic advisor: J. G. Fichte

Philosophical work
- Era: 19th-century philosophy
- Region: Western philosophy
- School: Post-Kantianism
- Institutions: University of Jena
- Notable students: Ernst Friedrich Apelt; Karl Ludwig Sand
- Main interests: Metaphysics; Psychology; Philosophy of science Philosophical logic
- Notable ideas: Empirical psychology as the basis of critical and transcendental philosophy Fries's trilemma

Jakob Friedrich Fries (/friːs/; German: [fʁiːs]; 23 August 1773 – 10 August 1843) was a German post-Kantian philosopher and mathematician.

== Biography ==
Fries studied theology at the academy of the Moravian Brethren at Niesky and philosophy at the Universities of Leipzig and Jena. After travelling, in 1806 he became professor of philosophy and elementary mathematics at the University of Heidelberg.

Though the progress of his psychological thought compelled him to abandon the positive theology of the Moravians, he retained an appreciation of its spiritual or symbolic significance. His philosophical position with regard to his contemporaries had already been made clear in his critical work Reinhold, Fichte und Schelling (1803), and in the more systematic treatises System der Philosophie als evidente Wissenschaft (1804) and Wissen, Glaube und Ahnung (1805).

Fries' most important treatise, the Neue oder anthropologische Kritik der Vernunft (2nd ed., 1828–1831), was an attempt to give a new foundation of psychological analysis to the critical philosophy of Immanuel Kant. In 1811 he published his System der Logik (ed. 1819 and 1837), and in 1814 Julius und Evagoras, a philosophical romance. He was also antisemitic, writing public polemics against Jews, and in 1816 wrote Ueber die Gefährdung des Wohlstandes und des Charakters der Deutschen durch die Juden (On the Danger Posed by the Jews to German Well-Being and Character), advocating among other things a distinct sign on the dress of Jews to distinguish them from the general population, and encouraging their emigration from German lands. He blamed the Jews for the ascendant role of money in society and called for Judaism to be "extirpated root and branch" from German society.

In 1816 he was invited to Jena to fill the chair of theoretical philosophy (including mathematics, physics, and philosophy proper), and entered upon a crusade against the prevailing Romanticism. In politics he was a strong Liberal and nationalist, and he did much to inspire the organization of the Burschenschaft. He also published a pamphlet calling for the exclusion of the Jews from public life in Germany. In 1816 he had published his views in a brochure, Von deutschem Bund und deutscher Staatsverfassung, dedicated to "the youth of Germany", and his influence gave a powerful impetus to the agitation which led in 1819 to the issue of the Carlsbad Decrees by the representatives of the German governments.

Karl Sand, the murderer of August von Kotzebue, was one of Fries's pupils; and a letter of his, found on another student, warning Sand against participation in secret societies, was twisted by the suspicious authorities into evidence of Fries' conspiracy. He was condemned by the Mainz Commission; the Grand Duke of Weimar was compelled to deprive him of his professorship; and he was forbidden to lecture on philosophy. The grand duke, however, continued to pay him his stipend, and in 1824 he was recalled to Jena as professor of mathematics and physics, receiving permission also to lecture on philosophy in his own rooms to a select number of students. Finally, in 1838, the unrestricted right of lecturing was restored to him.

Fries was involved in a dispute with the contemporary German philosopher G. W. F. Hegel. In the preface to his Philosophy of Right, Hegel criticised Fries' participation in student events and his role in the Burschenschaft. In Hegel's view, Fries was dependent upon "immediate perception and contingent imagination"; his views were emotional rather than rational. Hegel argued that Fries' methodology was not sufficiently scientific and that, therefore, his conclusions were illogical. Fries responded by accusing Hegel of defending the existing order and his own privileged position within it. He argued that "Hegel's metaphysical mushroom has grown not in the gardens of science but on the dunghill of servility." For Fries, Hegel's theories merely added up to a defence of the establishment and, specifically, the Prussian authorities.

== Works ==
The most important of the many works written during his Jena professorship are:

- Neue oder anthropologische Kritik der Vernunft (The New or Anthropological Critique of Reason, 1807)
- Ueber die Gefährdung des Wohlstandes und Charakters der Deutschen durch die Juden (On the Danger Posed by the Jews to German Well-Being and Character, 1816)
- Handbuch der praktischen Philosophie (Handbook of Practical Philosophy, 1817–1832)
- Handbuch der psychischen Anthropologie (Handbook of Psychical Anthropology, 1820–1821)
- Die mathematische Naturphilosophie (The Mathematical Philosophy of Nature, 1822)
- System der Metaphysik (System of Metaphysics, 1824)

== See also ==
- Neo-Kantianism
