= Kleinfelder =

Engineering and construction services company

Kleinfelder, Inc.
- Company type: Private
- Industry: Engineering, Construction Management, Design, Environmental Services, Consulting
- Founded: 1961
- Headquarters: San Diego, California, United States
- Key people: Louis Armstrong, CEO and President; Victor Auvinen, EVP, Chief Revenue Officer; John A. Murphy, EVP, COO; Erik Soderquist, EVP, CFO
- Owner: Lindsay Goldberg, LLC
- Number of employees: 3,100 (FY22)
- Website: www.kleinfelder.com

Kleinfelder, Inc. is an engineering, construction management, design and environmental professional services firm. Kleinfelder operates over 100 office locations in the United States, Canada, and Australia. The company headquarters is located in San Diego, California.

== History ==
In 1961, the company was founded by Jim Kleinfelder in Stockton, California under the name of Stockton Testing and Controls. The company was primarily involved in construction materials testing.

In September 2016, George J. Pierson, former CEO of Parsons Brinckerhoff, was named CEO of Kleinfelder, replacing Kevin Pottmeyer, the company's interim president and CEO.'

In December 2018, a majority stake in the firm was acquired by Wind Point Partners, a private equity firm based in Chicago.

In September 2019, Louis Armstrong was named president and CEO of Kleinfelder, and George Pierson (former CEO) became Kleinfelder's executive chairman.

From 2019 to 2021, Kleinfelder acquired Century Engineering Inc., Advantage Engineers, Garcia and Associates, Poggemeyer Design Group, and Gas Transmissions Systems.

On September 18, 2023, Lindsay Goldberg, LLC, a private equity firm, acquired the majority stake of Kleinfelder. Financial details of the transaction were not disclosed.

In 2025, Kleinfelder acquired Veenstra & Kimm, Inc. for an undisclosed amount.

== Notable projects ==
The company is made up of engineers, scientists, and construction professionals in the sectors of transportation, water, energy, and other private infrastructure. Projects within the markets the company serves include:

Energy Market:

- Oil and Gas Projects
- Power Projects

Private/Facilities Market:

- Commercial Projects
- Industrial Projects
- Institutional Projects

Transportation Market:

- Aviation Projects
- Marine Ports & Harbor Projects
- Rail & Mass Transit Projects
- Surface Transportation Projects

Water Market:

- Dam Projects
- Levee Projects
- Water Infrastructure Projects

Government/Federal Market:

- State and Local Government Projects
- US Air Force Projects
- US Army Corps of Engineers Projects
- US Navy Projects
