= Raleigh Academy =

19th c. school in Raleigh, N. Carolina, US

Coordinates: 35.7832°N 78.6356°W

Raleigh Academy, also Raleigh Male Academy for a period after the American Civil War, was a prominent school in Raleigh, North Carolina that lasted about 80 years until a governor's mansion (North Carolina Executive Mansion) took over its site. It opened in 1801.

North Carolina College of Agriculture and Mechanic Arts (Now known as NC State) played its first football game against Raleigh Male Academy on March 12, 1892, in what is now Pullen Park.

== Notable alumni ==
- William Henry Haywood Jr., former U.S. senator from the state of North Carolina
- John McKee, American football coach and physician
- Rufus Lenoir Patterson, businessman and politician
- J. W. Watson Sr., politician

== See also ==
- William Peace University
