= Rufus Lenoir Patterson =

American businessman and politician

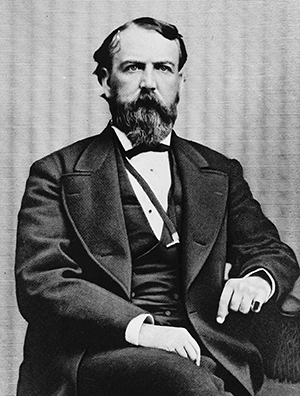

Mayor of Salem, North Carolina
- In office 1875–1876
- Preceded by: E. A. Vogler
- Succeeded by: Augustus Fogle

Personal details
- Born: June 22, 1830 Caldwell County, North Carolina, U.S.
- Died: July 15, 1879 (aged 49) Salem, North Carolina, U.S.
- Party: Democratic
- Spouse(s): Marie Louise Morehead (m. 1852; died 1862) Mary Elizabeth Fries (m. 1864; died 1879)
- Relations: Samuel L. Patterson (brother)
- Children: 11
- Parent(s): Samuel F. Patterson; Phoebe Caroline Jones
- Education: Raleigh Academy
- Alma mater: University of North Carolina

Rufus Lenoir Patterson (June 22, 1830 – July 15, 1879) was an American businessman and politician from North Carolina. Born into a prominent family, Patterson received private schooling before matriculating at the University of North Carolina. Electing to forgo a career in law, Patterson studied in a banking house and founded a series of mills in Salem, North Carolina. He served on the county court and was elected to a term as Mayor of Salem. Patterson was twice a delegate to state constitutional conventions. He was the father of Rufus Lenoir Patterson Jr.

== Early life ==
Patterson was born at Palmyra, the Patterson family plantation in Caldwell County, North Carolina, on June 22, 1830. He was the eldest son of Samuel F. Patterson, a politician who was a North Carolina State Treasurer, and Phoebe Caroline Jones. A younger brother, Samuel L. Patterson, was a North Carolina Commissioner of Agriculture.

His maternal grandfather was North Carolina politician Edmund Jones and his great-grandfather was Revolutionary War officer William Lenoir.

Patterson split time in his youth at Caldwell County and Raleigh, North Carolina, where his father worked. He attended the Raleigh Academy then schooled under Episcopal minister T. S. W. Mott. Patterson graduated from the University of North Carolina in 1851, then studied law under future U.S. Representative John Adams Gilmer. However, he found the study of law unappealing and, after a brief period farming at the family homestead, decided to pursue a career in business. He moved to Greensboro to study banking under Jesse H. Lindsay, his wife's uncle.

== Career ==
With the financial backing of former Governor of North Carolina John Motley Morehead, his father-in-law, Patterson opened a flour, cotton, and paper mill in Salem, North Carolina.

The success of the mills made Patterson one of the growing town's most prominent citizens. In 1855, he was elected to the Forsyth County Court as a Jacksonian Democrat, where he served for five years. Although he was disillusioned with the direction the party was heading, he nonetheless approved the state's ordinance of secession at the 1861 North Carolina Constitutional Convention. After his wife's death in 1862, he sold his mills and returned to Caldwell County. There, he managed his father's cotton factory in Patterson until it was burned during Stoneman's 1865 Raid. Later that year he was again a delegate to the state constitutional convention.

After the Civil War Patterson returned to Salem. He partnered with his new brother-in-law, Henry W. Fries, to operate several cotton and paper mills, including the Fries Cotton Mill. They also established a general merchandise store and Patterson invested in a railroad. He served as a director of the Northwestern and Western North Carolina Railroads. He served a term as trustee of North Carolina University in 1874. In 1875, he was elected Mayor of Salem, serving a one-year term.

== Personal life ==
On April 6, 1852, Patterson was married to Marie Louise Morehead, a daughter of Governor of North Carolina John Motley Morehead, in Guilford County. Before her death in 1862, they were the parents of five children, including a son that died in infancy:

- Caroline Finley Patterson (1856–1931), who married Judge Albert Lucian Coble in 1883. After he died in 1918, she married George Leander Frazier in 1925.
- Jesse Lindsay Patterson (1858–1922), a prominent lawyer who married Lucy Bramlette Patterson, a daughter of William Houston Patterson.
- Latitia Walker Patterson (1860–1884), who married Francis Henry Fries, the younger brother of her step-mother. After her death, he married Anna DeSchweinitz.
- Louis Morehead Patterson (1861–1886), who died in adolescence.

On June 14, 1864, roughly two years after Marie's death, Patterson married Mary Elizabeth Fries (1844–1927) at Salem. Mary was a daughter of Francis Levin Fries and Lisetta Maria (née Vogler) Fries. Together, they were the parents of six children:

- Francis Fries Patterson (1865–1933), a newspaperman who married Ethel Mary Thomas in 1895.
- Samuel Finley Patterson (1867–1926), a cotton manufacturer who married Bessie Alexander, a daughter of Dr. Amzi W. Alexander. They divorced in 1901 and he married Nancy Pearson in 1914.
- Andrew Henry Patterson (1870–1928), a physics professor who married Eleanor Spurrier Alexander, a daughter of Eben Alexander, in 1897.
- Rufus Lenoir Patterson Jr. (1872–1943), who founded American Machine and Foundry and served as a vice president of the American Tobacco Company; he married Margaret Warren Morehead, a daughter of Robert Lindsay "Eugene" Morehead.
- John Legerwood Patterson (1874–1935), who married Margaret Newman, a daughter of William Truslow Newman.
- Edmond Vogler Patterson (1878–1934), a cotton commission agent who married Helene Trimble in 1907 in Philadelphia.

In 1878, Patterson Sr., was accepted into the Moravian Church. He was a frequent benefactor to his alma mater. Patterson died in Salem on July 15, 1879, and was buried at Salem Woodland Cemetery.
