= Wilhelm von Henke =

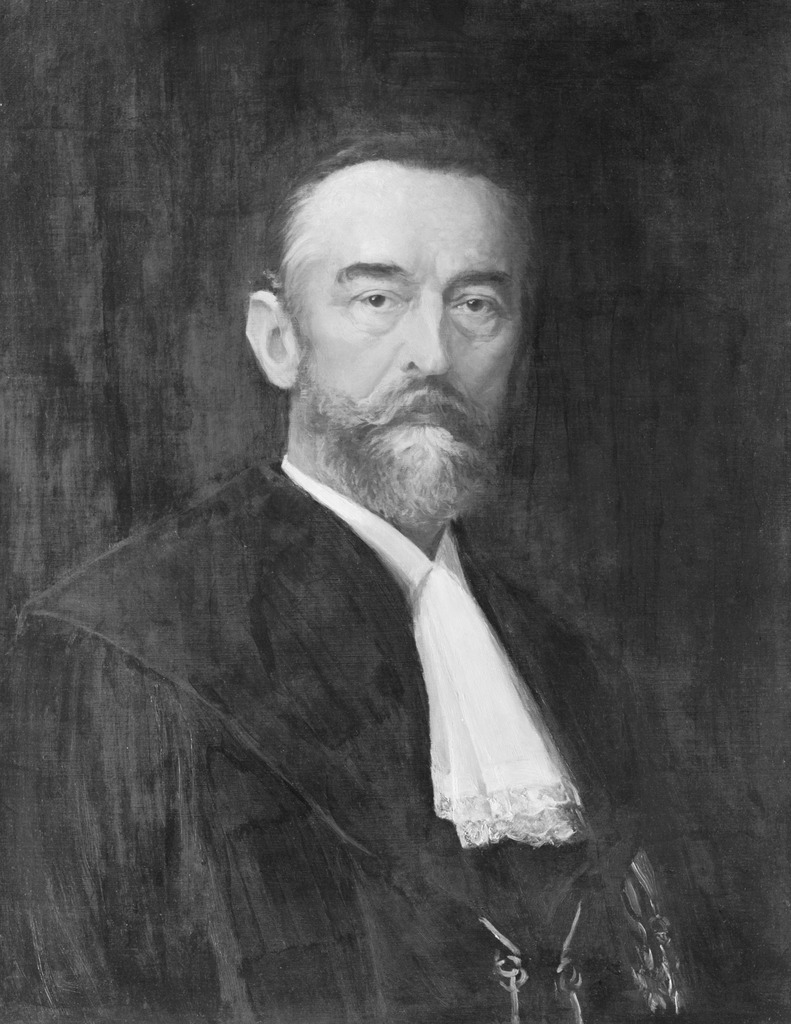
Wilhelm von Henke

Philipp Jakob Wilhelm von Henke (19 June 1834 in Jena – 17 May 1896 in Tübingen) was a German anatomist.

== Early life ==
On 19 June 1834, Henke was born. Henke's father was Ernst Ludwig Theodor Henke (1804–1872), a historian, while his mother was Berte Fries (1808-1866), a daughter of Jakob Friedrich Fries. This makes him the nephew of Hugo Friedrich Fries, and a cousin of Francis Henry Fries.

== Education ==
Henke studied at the universities of Marburg, Göttingen and Berlin, receiving his doctorate in 1857 at Marburg.

== Career ==
Henke started his career as an assistant to physiologist Franciscus Donders at Utrecht University. In 1858 he obtained his habilitation, then later served as a professor of anatomy at the universities of Rostock (from 1865), Prague (from 1872) and Tübingen (from 1875 up until his death in 1896).

The eponymous "Henke's space" is synonymous with the retropharyngeal space.

== Venus de Milo ==
Henke was a notable figure in the movement believing that the famous Ancient Greek Venus de Milo statue, sculpted some time between 150 - 100 BC, possibly had some kind of spinal curvature condition, like scoliosis. Henke noted that the statue of the Greek goddess Aphrodite had a slanted pelvis and legs of different lengths.

This observation led to some believing that the statue was meant to symbolise the appreciation of imperfection, in contrast to the established Ancient Greek obsession with the perfect human form (as exemplified in Polykeitos' Doryphoros statue), as well as a focus on inner beauty rather than the external appearance. Some even taking it so far as to believe the statue was meant as a symbol for disability.

Henke's colleague, Christophe Hasse, later performed extensive studies into the matter and concluded that the imperfections and asymmetry in the Venus de Milo statue were not significant enough to imply any kind of spinal issue or condition when compared to the population as a whole. Potentially disproving Henke's initial theory, as well as the later belief of the potential hidden meanings the statue may hold with regards to disability.

== Selected works ==
- Handbuch der Anatomie und Mechanik der Gelenke, 1863 – Handbook of anatomy and mechanics of the joints.
- Die Menschen des Michelangelo im Vergleich mit der Antike, 1871 – The human depictions by Michelangelo in comparison with those of antiquity.
- Beiträge zur Anatomie des Menschen in Beziehung auf Bewegung, 1872 – Contributions to human anatomy in relation to movement.
- Topographische Anatomie des Menschen. Atlas und Lehrbuch, 1879–83 – Topographical anatomy of humans.
- Handatlas und Anleitung zum Studium der Anatomie des Menschen im Präpariersaale, 1888 – Hand atlas and guide to the study of human anatomy.
- Anatomie des Kindesalters (in Gerhardt’s Handbuch der Kinderkrankheiten) – Anatomy of children.
