= Hilu =

Development
- Designer: AMF/outside design firm
- Year: 1972
- Design: Production (no longer built)
- Name: Hilu

Boat
- Crew: 1-2 (max. capacity, 225 pounds (102 kg)

Hull
- Type: Tacking outrigger
- Construction: Fiberglass
- Hull weight: 75 pounds (34 kg)
- LOA: 14 feet (4.3 m) outrigger float 10 feet (3.0 m)
- Beam: 7 feet 10 inches (2.39 m)

Hull appendages
- Keel: Daggerboard

Rig
- Rig type: Lateen

Sails
- Mainsail area: 65 square feet (6.0 m^{2})

The Hilu outrigger is a personal size, beach launched sports boat in the sailing canoe style. Hilu was AMF's production version of a boat variety more commonly found in designs hand-built by outrigger aficionados. Hilu utilizes fiberglass pontoons and carries a single polyester lateen sail mounted to an un-stayed aluminum mast.

Unlike most of the sailboats in their catalog, the Hilu was commissioned by and expressly designed for AMF. Hilu is the Hawaiian name for the black striped wrasse, a species of reef fish, apparently alluding to the Polynesian heritage of the sailing canoe. This added yet another species to AMF's creel of sailboats named for oceanic wildlife.

== Characteristics ==
The Hilu is a tacking outrigger. The hulls are of unequal length and displacement, and the mast is stepped in the larger of the two pontoon hulls. The Hilu is sometimes mistaken for a catamaran or a proa, but it is neither. A catamaran has two identical hulls, and a proa shunts rather than tacking and jibing to come about.

Hilu tacks and jibes as a normal sailboat, it has permanent fore and aft ends rather than a permanent windward and leeward side, and it does not "shunt" to come about so is more akin to the Malibu outrigger of the 1950s. Due to the asymmetric sailing behavior, Hilu is not quite as easy for the novice sailor to master as some of AMF's other beach boats.

== History ==
To create the Hilu, AMF commissioned an industrial design/commercial art group in Farmington, Connecticut, which had no prior experience with boat design. Upon its debut, experienced sailors were not impressed by the way the Hilu sailed.

Hilu never received the same level of acceptance by the sailing public as other AMF boats, particularly the Sunfish. This may have been due to its design not being quite so novice friendly, or it may have been due to the experimental nature of AMF's attempt to bring something different to the commercial side of beach boating.

With demand falling far below the popularity of its AMF cousins, the Hilu lasted only a few years in the marketplace.

After AMF acquired Alcort, Inc. in 1969, they named their sailboat product line the "Alcort Division", springboarding off the strong name recognition that Alcort, Inc. had built up over its 24-year history developing and marketing beach boats.
