= Ernst Friedrich Apelt =

German philosopher and entrepreneur

Ernst Friedrich Apelt (3 March 1812 – 27 October 1859) was a German philosopher and entrepreneur.

== Life ==
Apelt was born in Reichenau, Saxony.

He graduated from secondary school in Zittau and entered the University of Jena in 1831. He then continued his studies at the University of Leipzig. He received his doctorate in 1835 and four years later completed his habilitation in Jena. He taught there from 1840 and became a full professor in 1856.

Apelt was a student of Jakob Friedrich Fries, succeeding him at the University of Jena. He was the principal contributor to the Abhandlungen der Fries'sche Schule, which he founded with Matthias Jakob Schleiden.

He was also one of the early scholars of the life and work of Johannes Kepler, a precursor of Alexandre Koyré.

Apelt died in Oppelsdorf, Upper Lusatia, Saxony. His son Otto Friedrich Apelt made important contributions to the debate on the nature of the categories of Aristotle.

== Works ==
- Die Epochen der Geschichte der Menschheit. Eine historisch-philosophische Skizze. Mauke, Jena 1845–1846, 2 vols. (volume 1), (volume 2)
- Johann Keplers astronomische Weltansicht. Weigel, Leipzig 1849. ()
- Die Reformation der Sternkunde. Ein Beitrag zur deutschen Culturgeschichte. Mauke, Jena 1852. ()
- Die Theorie der Induktion. Engelmann, Leipzig 1854. ()
- Metaphysik. Engelmann, Leipzig 1857. ()
- Religionsphilosophie. Ed by Gustav Wilhelm Frank. Engelmann, Leipzig 1860. ()
