= Wind Point Partners =

American private equity firm

- Type: Private
- Industry: Private equity
- Founded: 1984; 42 years ago
- Headquarters: Chicago, Illinois, United States
- Products: Leveraged buyout, Growth capital
- Total assets: $4 billion
- Number of employees: 30+
- Website: wppartners.com

Wind Point Partners is an American private equity firm focused on growth capital investments and leveraged buyouts in middle-market companies. The firm focuses on the following industry sectors: Consumer Products, Industrial Products, and Business Services. Wind Point's strategy involves partnering with executives who typically have run a P&L of $1 billion or greater to acquire businesses with enterprise values between $100 million and $500 million.

The firm, which is based in Chicago, Illinois, was founded in 1984. It was founded and funded by S. Curtis Johnson of Racine, Wisconsin, heir to the SC Johnson fortune.

== History ==
Since its founding, Wind Point has raised approximately $4 billion of investor commitments and completed more than 100 investments and 300 add-on acquisitions. across its nine private equity funds. The firm began raising their ninth fund in 2019 with a $1.2 billion target. The firm completed fundraising for its eighth fund in 2017 with $985 million of investor commitments. Wind Point's prior funds were raised in 2009 with $915 million of investor commitments and 2005 with $715 million of investor commitments.

Since inception, Wind Point acquisitions have included Pacific Cycle (also maker of Schwinn bicycles), Bushnell Corporation, Bakery Chef, Gehl Foods, Radienz Living (formerly named US Nonwovens), and Ames True Temper.
