= Morehead-Patterson Bell Tower =

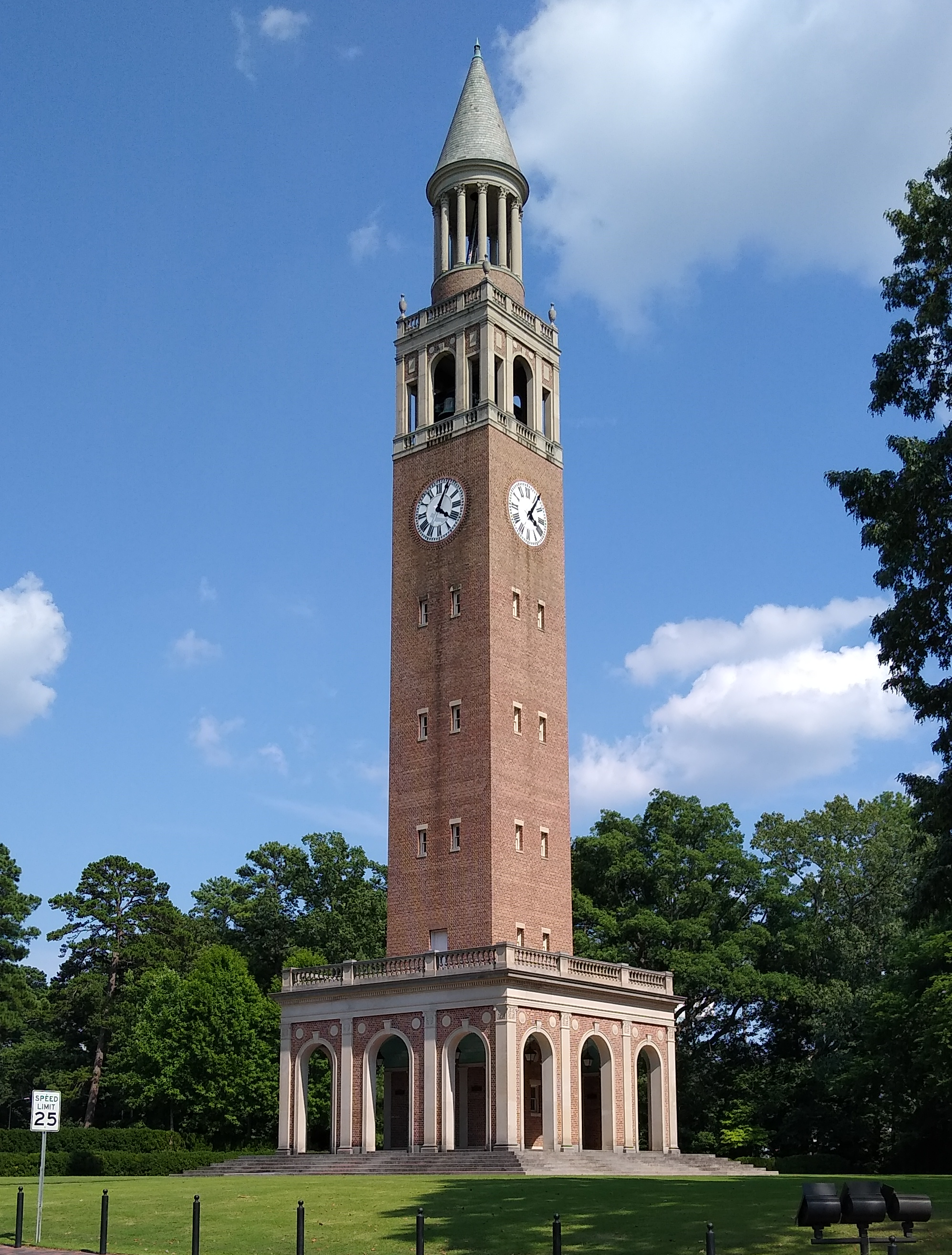
- Morehead-Patterson Bell Tower at the University of North Carolina at Chapel Hill

- Location within North Carolina

General information
- Type: Campanile
- Location: Chapel Hill, North Carolina, United States
- Coordinates: 35.9086°N 79.0492°W
- Completed: 1931

Height
- Height: 172 feet (52 m)

The Morehead-Patterson Bell Tower is a functioning bell tower located on the campus of The University of North Carolina at Chapel Hill (UNC). It is a 172-foot-tall tower with a Roman numeral clock built-in on each of the four sides of the tower. The top of the bell tower holds an observation area. It is topped by a conical spire structure. The area around the bell tower is surrounded by hedges and a grass lawn designed by University botany professor William Chambers Coker, who also designed the Coker Arboretum on campus. The tower is one of the most visible landmarks on campus.

== History ==
The idea of erecting a bell tower on the University of North Carolina campus was originally suggested by John Motley Morehead III in the 1920s, but it was denied several times by the University because of conflicts regarding the location. When the idea was finally approved, the construction began with the funding of two sponsors, Morehead and Rufus Lenoir Patterson Jr. The tower was designed by McKim, Mead & White, an architectural firm. The vaulted tiling of the ground level arcade is Guastavino tile designed by Rafael Guastavino, Jr.

The tower was dedicated and received by Governor Oliver Max Gardner on Thanksgiving Day of 1931 with an acceptance address.

When head football coach Mack Brown returned to Chapel Hill following the 2018 season, he brought with him the tradition of lighting the bell tower Carolina blue after every Tar Heel victory, as he had similarly done at Texas with The Tower, lighting the Tower burnt orange after every Longhorn victory. The bell tower is adjacent to the north end of Kenan Stadium.

== Belfry ==
The belfry originally began with 12 manually operated bells made by Meneely Bell Foundry in 1931. It is currently equipped with 14 mechanized bells with the addition of 2 bells by Petit & Fritsen in 1998. The names of prominent figures in the University history, Governor John Motley Morehead and William Lenoir, are inscribed on the two largest bells.

The bells ring every 15 minutes, chiming on the hour. In addition, the bells play other songs or the alma mater as part of University celebrations or holidays.
