= Herbert Parsons (New York politician) =

American politician (1869–1925)

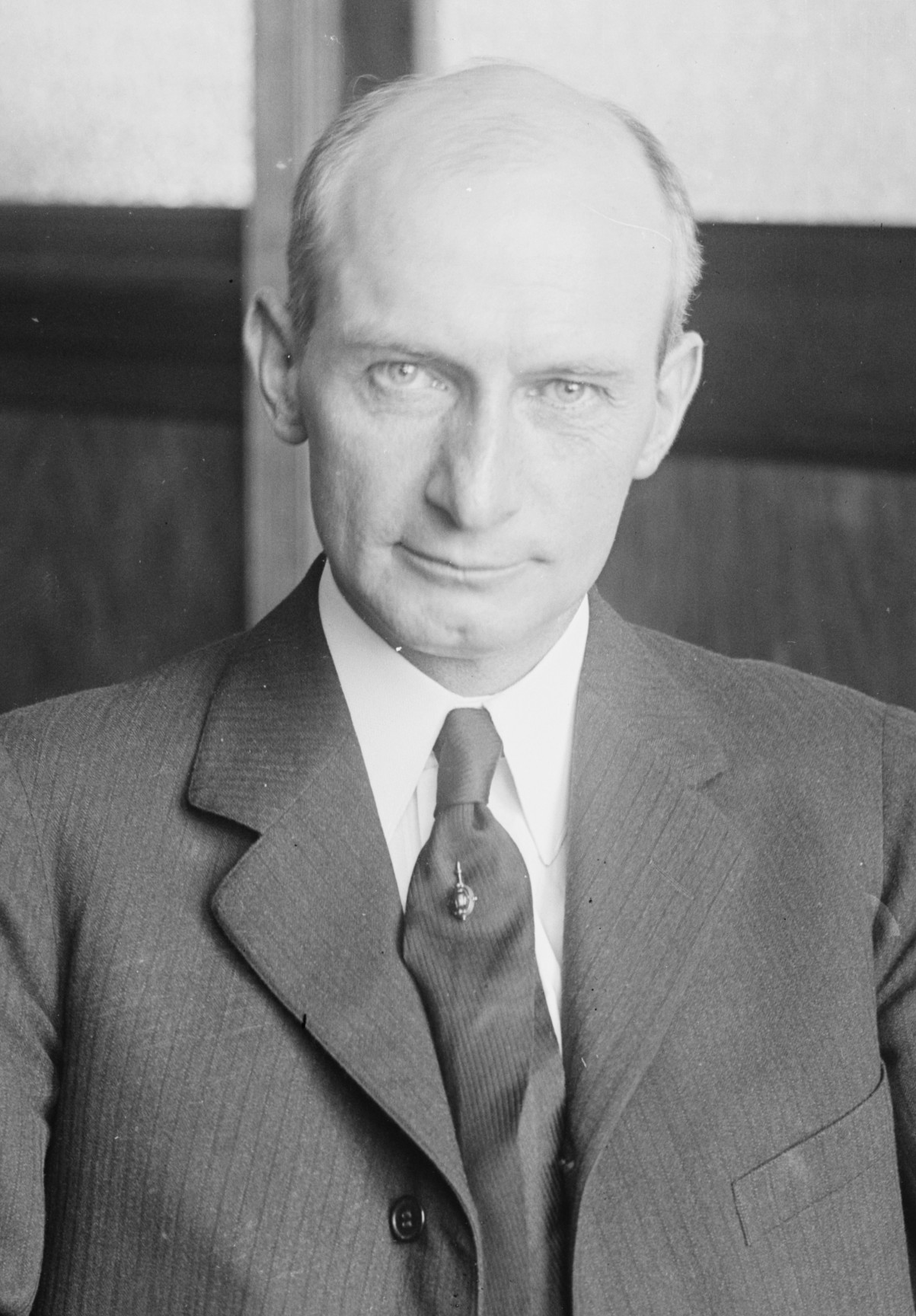

Member of the U.S. House of Representatives from New York's 13th district
- In office March 4, 1905 – March 3, 1911
- Preceded by: Francis B. Harrison
- Succeeded by: Jefferson M. Levy

Personal details
- Born: October 28, 1869 New York City, New York, U.S.
- Died: September 16, 1925 (aged 55) Pittsfield, Massachusetts, U.S.
- Spouse: Elsie Worthington Clews
- Children: 4
- Parent(s): John Edward Parsons; Mary Dumesnil McIlvaine
- Education: Yale University (1890)
- Occupation: Lawyer, Congressman

Herbert Parsons (October 28, 1869 – September 16, 1925) was a U.S. representative from New York.

== Early life ==
Parsons was born in New York City on October 28, 1869. He was the son of John Edward Parsons, a former president of the New York City Bar Association, and Mary Dumesnil McIlvaine.

Parsons attended private schools in New York City, St. Paul's School, Concord, New Hampshire, Yale University, the University of Berlin, Harvard Law School, and was graduated from Yale University in 1890. While at Yale, he was a member of Gamma Nu, Delta Kappa Epsilon, and Scroll and Key.

== Career ==
He was admitted to the bar in 1894 and commenced practice in New York City. He served as member of the board of aldermen of New York City in 1900–1904. He was one of the most active members of the Society of American Friends of Russian Freedom, acting as president of the organization.

He was elected as a Republican to the Fifty-ninth, Sixtieth, and Sixty-first Congresses (March 4, 1905 – March 3, 1911). A 1910 run for reelection to the Sixty-second Congress was unsuccessful, and Parsons resumed the practice of law in New York City.

He served as delegate to all Republican New York State conventions from 1904 to 1920, and to the Republican National Conventions in 1908, 1912, 1916, and 1920. During the First World War he served on the general staff of the American Expeditionary Forces.

== Personal life ==
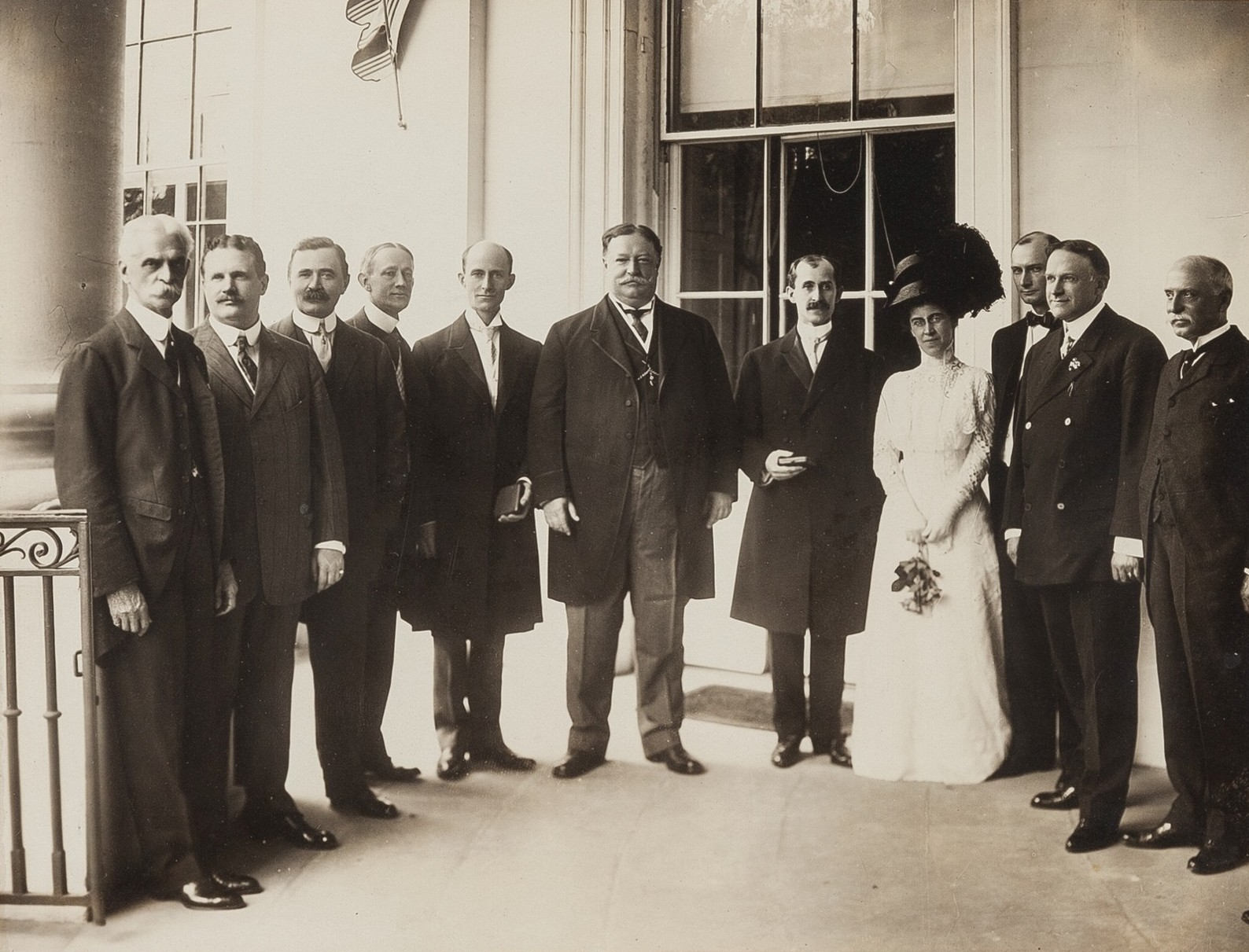
Wilbur Wright; President William Howard Taft; Orville Wright; Katharine Wright; and Parsons in 1909.

Parsons was married to Elsie Worthington Clews, an anthropologist and folklorist of the indigenous people of the American Southwest. She was the daughter of financier and author Henry Clews. They were married in Newport, Rhode Island on September 1, 1900. Together, they were the parents of:

- Elsie "Lissa" Parsons (1901–1966), who married inventor Morehead Patterson, son of Rufus L. Patterson Jr., in 1921. They divorced in 1929 and she married John Drummond Kennedy in 1934.
- John Edward Parsons (b. 1903)
- Herbert Parsons (b. 1909)
- Henry McIlvaine "Mac" Parsons (1911–2004), a noted behavioral psychologist.

Parsons died in Pittsfield, Massachusetts, September 16, 1925. He was interred in Lenox Cemetery.

=== Descendants ===
Through his eldest daughter Elsie, he was a grandfather of Herbert Parsons Patterson (1925–1985), who became president of the Chase Manhattan Bank in 1968.

== Sources ==
- United States Congress. "Herbert Parsons (id: P000088)". Biographical Directory of the United States Congress.

U.S. House of Representatives
Preceded by Francis B. Harrison	Member of the U.S. House of Representatives from New York's 13th congressional district March 4, 1905 – March 3, 1911	Succeeded by Jefferson M. Levy
