= Rufus L. Patterson Jr. =

American businessman (1872–1943)

President of American Machine and Foundry Company
- In office 1900–1941
- Preceded by: Inaugural holder
- Succeeded by: Morehead Patterson

Personal details
- Born: July 11, 1872 Salem, North Carolina, U.S.
- Died: April 11, 1943 (aged 70) Manhattan, New York City, U.S.
- Spouse: Margaret Warren Morehead (m. 1895; died 1943)
- Relations: Samuel F. Patterson (grandfather); Samuel L. Patterson (uncle)
- Children: Morehead Patterson; Lucy Lathrop de Rham
- Parent(s): Rufus Lenoir Patterson; Mary Elizabeth Fries
- Education: University of North Carolina

Rufus Lenoir Patterson Jr. (July 11, 1872 – April 11, 1943) was an American businessman who founded American Machine and Foundry and served as a vice president of the American Tobacco Company.

== Early life ==
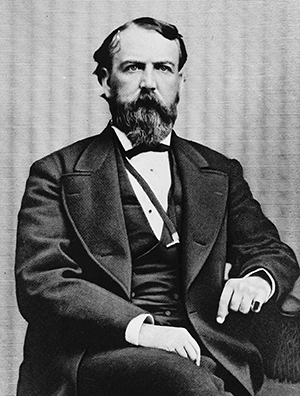
Patterson's father, Rufus Lenoir Patterson

Patterson was born in Salem, North Carolina, on July 11, 1872, into the prominent Patterson family. He was a son of Rufus Lenoir Patterson and, his second wife, Mary Elizabeth (née Fries) Patterson. His father served as Mayor of Salem, North Carolina. From his parents marriage, he had five siblings. From his father's first marriage to Marie Louise Morehead, he had five elder half-siblings (although one died before his birth).

His father was the eldest son of Samuel F. Patterson, a politician who was a North Carolina State Treasurer, and Phoebe Caroline (née Jones) Patterson. His uncle, Samuel L. Patterson, was a North Carolina Commissioner of Agriculture. His maternal grandparents were Francis Levin Fries and Lisetta Maria (née Vogler) Fries. His maternal uncle, Francis Henry Fries, married his half-sister, Latitia Walker Patterson.

Patterson gave up formal schooling at the age of fifteen, worked a short while for a railroad, then spent a year studying at The University of North Carolina at Chapel Hill.

== Career ==
Patterson left the University of North Carolina to work with inventor William H. Kerr. In 1891, he went to England to introduce the Kerr tobacco machine. After studying mechanical engineering in England for two years, he returned to Durham, where he became associated with James Buchanan Duke and the American Tobacco Company in 1898, of which Patterson later became a vice-president in 1901. During this period, he "developed several machines, including the Patterson packer, to weigh, pack, label, and stamp smoking tobacco, which revolutionized the tobacco industry."

In 1900, American Tobacco spun off its machinery division as the American Machine and Foundry Company and Patterson became its first president. He held this position until 1941 when he became chairman of its board of directors. When he retired as president of AMF, he was succeeded by his son Morehead, who also became chairman of the board following his death in April 1943.

Under his leadership, the companies developed a number of machines, including the "Standard Tobacco Stemmer" in 1908, the "Standard Cigarette Machine" in 1908, and a long filler cigar machine in 1918. He also diversified into other fields, beginning with the development of the "Standard Bread Wrapper" in 1924. The company was added to the New York Stock Exchange in 1926. In addition, he served as president of the International Cigar Machinery Company, which later became a subsidiary of AMF.

=== Philanthropy ===
In the 1920s, Patterson and his college classmate and fraternity brother, John Motley Morehead III (who was also a first cousin of his wife), funded the $100,000 construction cost of the Morehead-Patterson Bell Tower, a bell tower designed by McKim, Mead & White and located on the campus of The University of North Carolina at Chapel Hill. It was initially built to commemorate the NC State alumni that fell during World War I. The Tower was dedicated in November 1931.

== Personal life ==
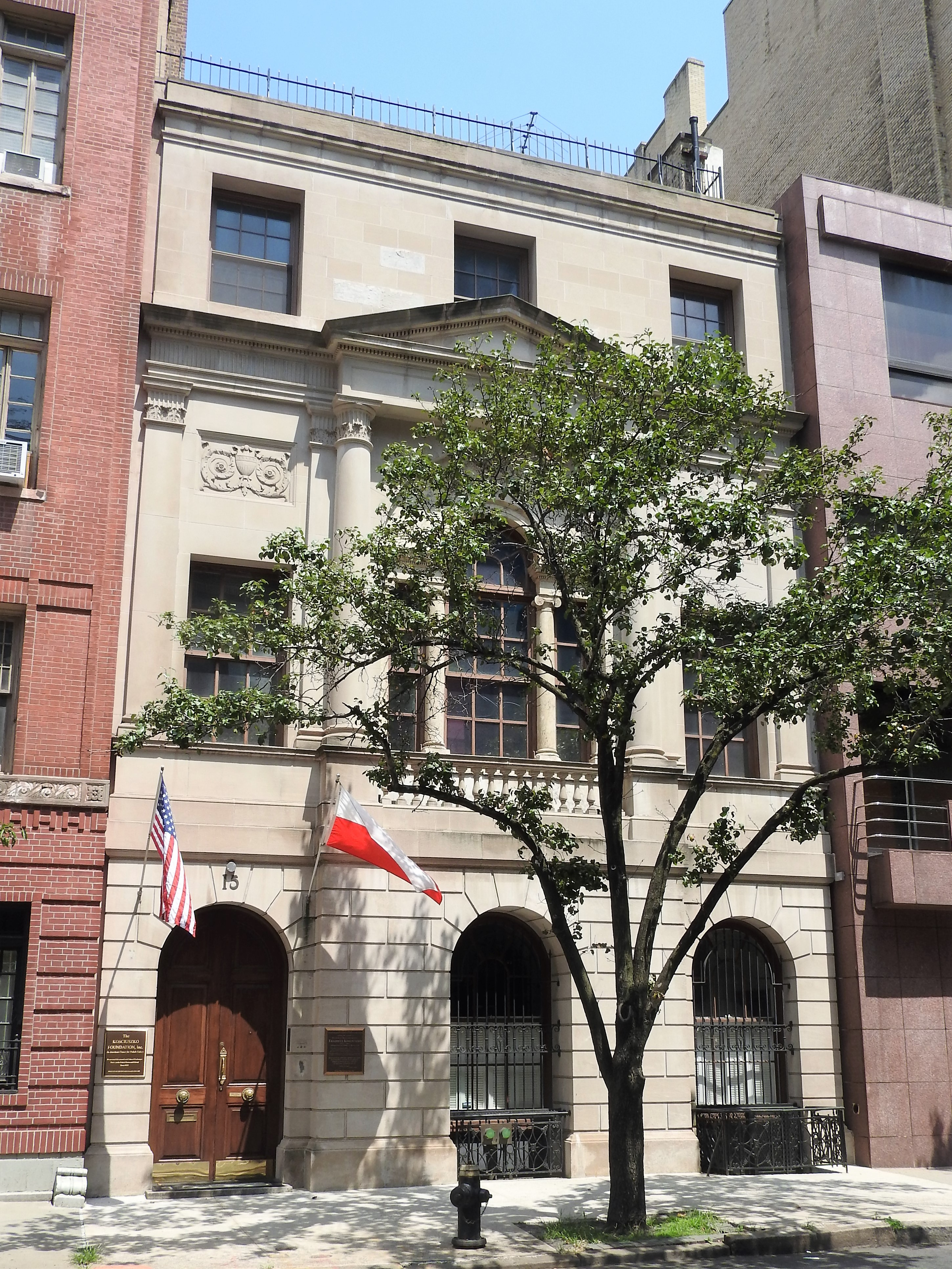
The Patterson's Manhattan townhouse at 15 East 65th Street

On November 27, 1895, Patterson married Margaret Warren "Madge" Morehead (1874–1968), a niece of his father's first wife. She was the daughter of Lucy Cornelia Lathrop and Robert Lindsay Morehead (the youngest son of North Carolina Governor John Motley Morehead of Blandwood). From 1919 until 1943, (Note: Before 1919, the Pattersons lived at 22 East 72nd Street, a neo-Renaissance style row house designed by Rose & Stone and built in Manhattan between 1893-94.) they divided their time between their limestone neo-Renaissance three-story Manhattan townhouse at 15 East 65th Street (which they bought from James J. Van Alen who had built the mansion in 1917), and Lenoir (now called Linden) their estate at Southampton on Long Island. Together, they were the parents of:

- Morehead Patterson (1897–1962), who married Elsie Parsons, a daughter of Herbert Parsons and Elsie Clews Parsons, in 1921. They divorced in 1929 and he married Helen Isabelle (née Mitchell) Clark, a daughter of journalist Roscoe Conklin Mitchell, in 1945. After her death in 1955, he married Margaret Morgan (née Tilt) Jacob, the former wife of Walter Phelps Jacob who was a daughter of automaker and Diamond T founder Charles Arthur Tilt, in 1956.
- Lucy Lathrop Patterson (1900–1977), who married Casimir de Rham, a descendant of Henry Casimir de Rham, in 1919.

After a brief illness, Patterson died at his New York townhouse on April 11, 1943. After his death, his widow sold their townhouse to the Kosciuszko Foundation, and moved to 834 Fifth Avenue, where she died in 1968.

=== Descendants ===
Through his son Morehead, he was a grandfather of two grandsons, Rufus Lenoir Patterson III (1922–1944), a Lieutenant with the USAAF who was killed in action during World War II (he married Mae Gouverneur Cadwalader, daughter of Gouverneur Cadwalader), and Herbert Parsons Patterson (1925–1985), who became president of the Chase Manhattan Bank in 1968.

Through his daughter, he was a grandfather of two grandsons, Casimir de Rham (1924–2011), who married Elizabeth Evarts, (Note: Elizabeth Evarts (1926–2008), was a descendant of Gov. Edwin D. Morgan through her mother, Katharine Avery Morgan, and through her father, Jeremiah Maxwell Evarts, a granddaughter of lawyer Maxwell Evarts and great-granddaughter of U.S. Senator William Maxwell Evarts.), and David Patterson de Rham (1931–1995), who married Rachael Thompson. (Note: Rachael Thompson (1933–2016), was a daughter of Abbott Bradford Thompson, a direct descendent of William Bradford, Governor of Plymouth Colony, and a framer of the Mayflower Compact.)
