= Samuel F. Patterson =

American politician

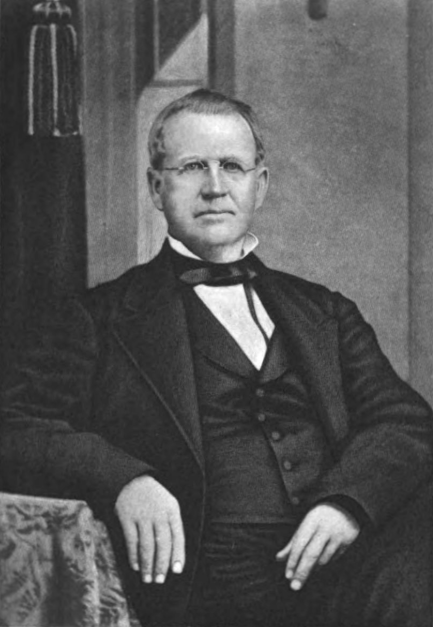

North Carolina State Treasurer
- In office 1835–1837
- Preceded by: William S. Mhoon
- Succeeded by: Daniel W. Courts

Member of the North Carolina Senate for the 48th Senatorial District
- In office 1846–1848
- Preceded by: Burgess S. Gaither
- Succeeded by: Tod R. Caldwell

Member of the North Carolina Senate for the 46th Senatorial District
- In office 1864–1864
- Preceded by: Samuel J. Neal
- Succeeded by: James M. Isbell

Member of the North Carolina House of Commons Representing Caldwell County
- In office 1854–1854
- Preceded by: Elisha P. Miller
- Succeeded by: Cornelius W. Clark

Personal details
- Born: Samuel Finley Patterson; March 11, 1799 Rockbridge County, Virginia, U.S.
- Died: January 20, 1874 (aged 74) Caldwell County, North Carolina, U.S.

Samuel Finley Patterson (March 11, 1799 – January 20, 1874) was a North Carolina politician, planter, businessman, and member of the prominent Patterson family.

== Early life ==
Patterson was born on March 11, 1799, in Rockbridge County, Virginia. He went to live with his uncle in Wilkesboro, North Carolina, in 1811.

== Career ==
Patterson had a lifelong interest in politics. At the age of 22, he won the position of engrossing clerk of the North Carolina House of Commons. He later became clerk of the North Carolina Senate, and, from 1835 to 1837, he served as state treasurer. Even though Patterson was a Whig, he was elected treasurer by a majority-Democratic state legislature. While serving as treasurer, he also served as president of the state bank.

Patterson served as chair of the Caldwell County court; as a member of the House of Commons (1854); and as a state senator (1846, 1848, and 1864). In 1866, he served as a delegate to the second session of the state's constitutional convention. Other offices Patterson held included president of the Raleigh and Gaston Railroad, clerk of the Superior Court, justice of the peace, Indian commissioner, trustee of the University of North Carolina, and various positions with the Masons.

== Personal life ==
In 1824, Patterson married Phoebe Caroline Jones (1806–1869). A granddaughter of Gen. William Lenoir, she was a daughter of Ann (née Lenoir) Jones and politician Edmund Jones. The two would live much of their life together at her family home, "Palmyra", in Caldwell County, a county which he helped persuade the state legislature to create in 1841. He and his wife had several children, including:

- Rufus Lenoir Patterson (1830–1879), who married Marie Louise Morehead Patterson in 1852. After her death in 1862, he married Mary Elizabeth Fries in 1864.
- Samuel Legerwood Patterson (1850–1918), who served as North Carolina Commissioner of Agriculture; he married Mary Sophia Senseman in 1873.

He died at Palmyra on January 20, 1874.

Political offices
Preceded by William S. Mhoon	Treasurer of North Carolina; 1835–1837	Succeeded by Daniel W. Courts
