= Roadmaster (bicycle company) =

American bicycle company

- Type: Subsidiary
- Industry: Bicycles
- Founded: 1936; 90 years ago
- Headquarters: Olney, Illinois
- Products: Bicycle and Related Components
- Parent: Pon Holdings

Roadmaster is an American bicycle brand currently owned by Pacific Cycle, which in turn is owned by Dutch conglomerate Pon Holdings.

== History ==
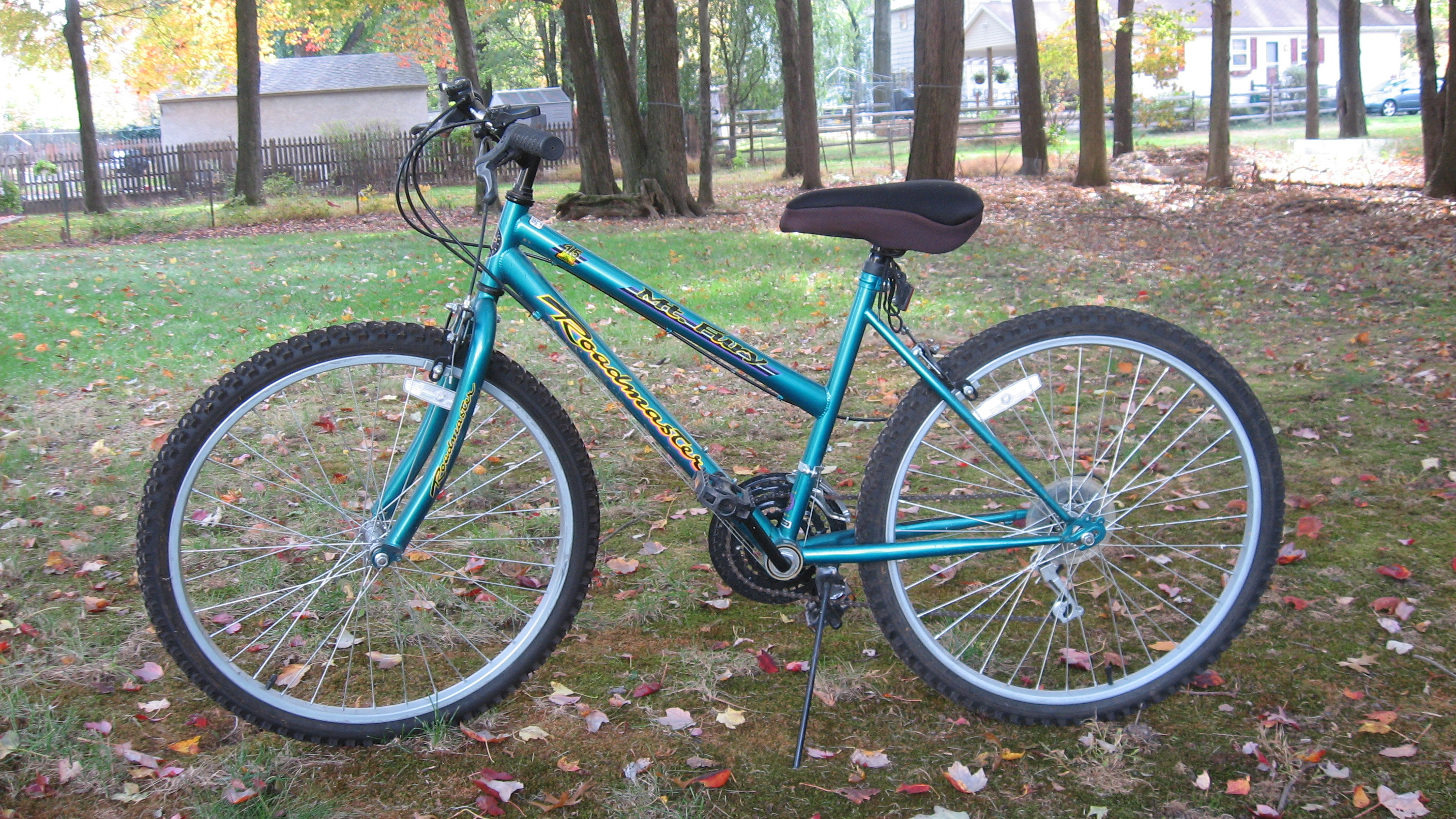
Roadmaster Mt Fury

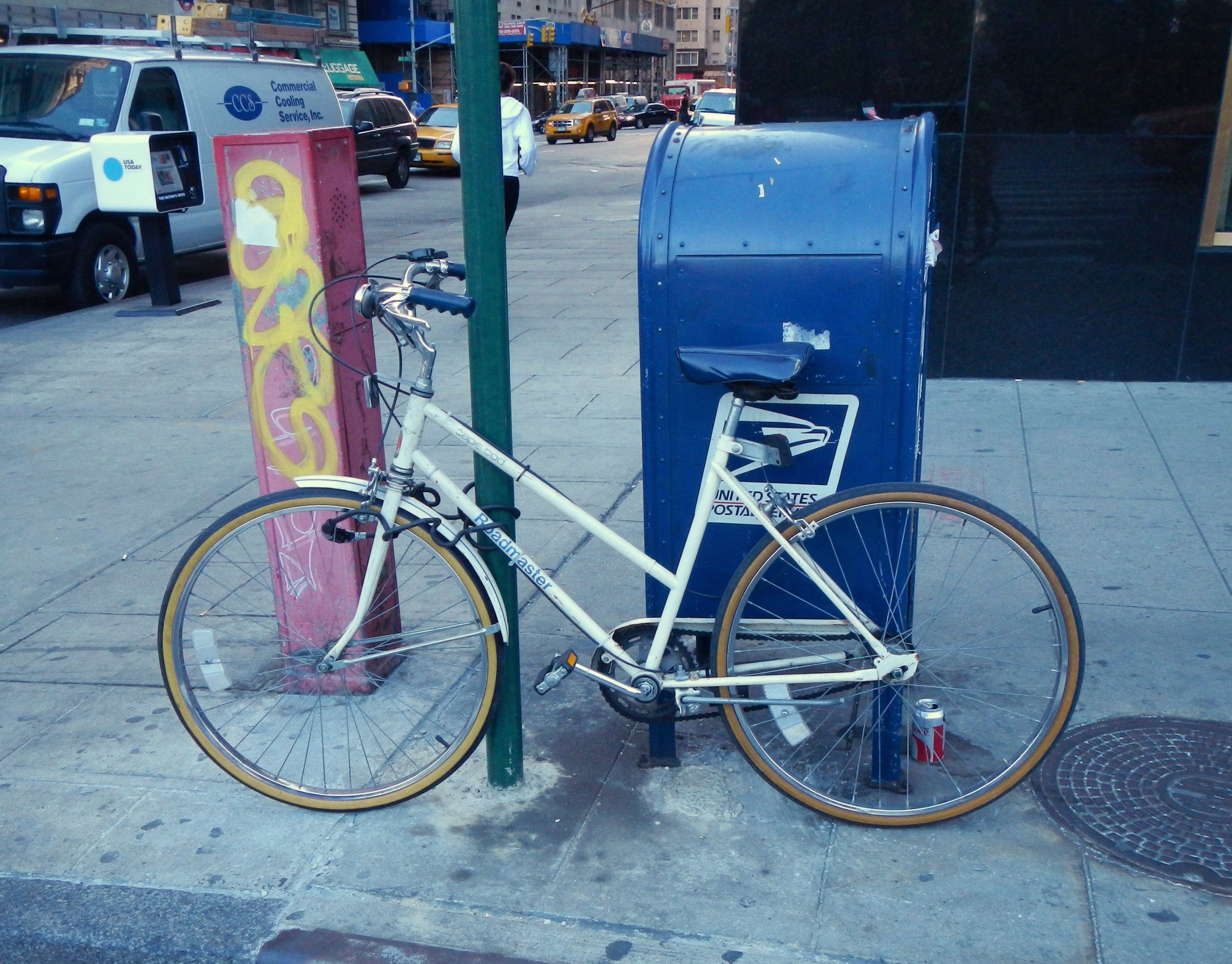
Roadmaster Cape Cod on New York street

Roadmaster Bicycles were first introduced by the Cleveland Welding Company in 1936. In 1950, after purchasing the Roadmaster line of children's and youth bicycles from the Cleveland Welding Company, AMF entered the bicycle manufacturing business with its newly formed AMF Wheeled Goods Division. In 1953, after a labor strike, AMF moved bicycle manufacturing from the UAW-organized plant in Cleveland, Ohio, to a new facility in Little Rock, Arkansas. The new plant was heavily automated and featured more than a mile of part conveyor belts in six separate systems, including an electrostatic spray painting operation.

Taking advantage of the increase in its target markets in the aftermath of the baby boom, AMF was able to diversify its product line, adding exercise equipment under the brand name Vitamaster in 1950. As demand for bicycles continued to expand, the company found the need for a new manufacturing facility to keep up with demand. As two-wheeled bicycles increased in popularity a new plant was built in Little Rock, Arkansas in 1951. In 1962, the company moved its operations to Olney, Illinois, where it built a new factory on a 122-acre (0.49 km^{2}) site that would remain the company's principal bicycle manufacturing location into the 1990s. Products manufactured there were children's vehicles, sidewalk bikes, toy autos, tricycles, garden tractors, seat cars and wagons and playground equipment. The company produced over 100,000 miniature Mustangs for Ford Motor Company late in the 1960s. BMX bikes, mopeds and exercise bicycles were introduced in the 1970s.

After two decades of consistent growth, the AMF Wheel Goods Division stalled under the long-distance management of a parent company bogged down in layers of corporate management and marginally profitable product lines. Manufacturing quality as well as the technical standard of the Roadmaster bicycle line - once the pride of the company - had fallen to an all-time low. Bicycles made at the Olney plant were manufactured so poorly that some Midwestern bike shops refused to repair them, claiming that the bikes would not stay fixed no matter how much labor and effort was put into them. The division's problems with quality and outside competition were neatly summed up in a 1979 American film, Breaking Away, in which identical secondhand AMF Roadmaster track bicycles were used by competitors in the Little 500 bicycle race. Despite this product placement, the film's protagonist expressed a decided preference for his lightweight Italian Masi road racing bike, deriding the elderly Roadmaster as a 'piece of junk'.

In 1983 AMF sold the assets to George Nebel, the General Manager, and Bob Zinnen. In 1987 the company was sold to entrepreneur and merger and acquisition expert Thomas W. Itin. Itin brought in two other investors, Equitex and Enercorp, both Business Development Companies (BDCs) under the 40 Act BDCs run by Henry Fong. It changed its name to Roadmaster Industries, Inc. and positioned itself as the leader in the fitness equipment and junior toy industries. Itin and Fong took the company public through an IPO at the end of 1987. Itin and Fong acquired over 20 companies in the sporting goods field. Roadmaster grew from $40,000,00 in unprofitable sales to over $800,000,000 of highly profitable sales. Under the stock trading symbol of RDMI it went from being listed on the NASDQ SmallCap Market to being large cap on the American Stock Exchange and then the New York Stock Exchange and became a Fortune 1000 company.

Helped by the increasing popularity of Mountain Bikes, Roadmaster experienced a 72% increase in bicycle sales in 1993. A new bicycle production plant was built in Effingham, Illinois to keep pace with the growing demand. Roadmaster acquired Flexible Flyer Company, whose history dates back to 1889.

In 1997 the Roadmaster bicycle division was sold to the Brunswick Corporation. However, it had already become evident that production of low-cost, mass-market bicycles in the United States was no longer viable in the face of intense foreign competition, and in 1999, all U.S. production of Roadmaster bicycles ceased. Brunswick sold its bicycle division and the Roadmaster brand to Pacific Cycle, which began distributing a new Roadmaster line of bicycles imported from Taiwan and the People's Republic of China. Pacific Cycle still uses the Olney facility for corporate offices and as a product inventory and distribution center.
