= Morehead Patterson =

American businessman, diplomat and inventor

Morehead Patterson (October 9, 1897 – August 5, 1962) was an American businessman, a diplomat, an inventor, and president, CEO and chairman of American Machine and Foundry, the company founded by his father Rufus Patterson.

== Early life ==
Patterson was born in Durham, North Carolina on October 9, 1897 but his family moved to New York City in 1899. He was the only son of Rufus L. Patterson Jr. and Margaret Warren "Madge" (née Morehead) Patterson (1874–1968). His only sibling was Lucy Lathrop Patterson, who married Casimir de Rham (a descendant of Henry Casimir de Rham).

His paternal grandparents were Rufus Lenoir Patterson and, his second wife, Mary Elizabeth (née Fries) Patterson. His grandfather served as Mayor of Salem, North Carolina. His maternal grandparents were Lucy Cornelia Lathrop and Robert Lindsay Morehead (the youngest son of North Carolina Governor John Motley Morehead of Blandwood).

After attending the Groton School, he matriculated at Yale University, Oxford University and Harvard University, earning a law degree from Harvard University in 1924.

== Career ==
In 1941, his father retired as president of AMF and became chairman of the board of directors. Morehead replaced him as president and following the elder Patterson's death in 1943, Morehead replaced him as chairman of the board and was succeeded as president by Herbert H. Leonard (former president of the Consolidated Packaging Machinery Corporation of Buffalo, New York). Patterson led expansion of AMF from $5 million a year company to $500 million a year conglomerate. In 1959, Patterson was elected chairman of the Brookings Institution.

With the rank of Ambassador, he represented the United States at the United Nations Committee on Disarmament in 1954 and at the International Atomic Energy Agency Negotiations in London in 1954 and 1955. He also served as chairman of the Nuclear Standards Board of the American Standards Association.

== Personal life ==
In 1921, Patterson was married to Elsie Parsons, a daughter of Herbert Parsons and Elsie Clews Parsons. Before their divorce in 1929, they were the parents of:

- Rufus Lenoir Patterson III (1922–1944), a Lieutenant with the USAAF who was killed in action during World War II; he married Mae Gouverneur Cadwalader, daughter of Gouverneur Cadwalader in 1942.
- Herbert Parsons Patterson (1925–1985), who became president of the Chase Manhattan Bank in 1968.

In 1945, he married Helen Isabelle (née Mitchell) Clark (1909–1955), a daughter of journalist Roscoe Conklin Mitchell and Clara Belle (née Howland) Mitchell, in 1945.

After her death in 1955, he married Margaret Morgan (née Tilt) Jacob (1903–1996), the former wife of Dr. Arthur D. Bissell and Walter Phelps Jacob who was a daughter of automaker and Diamond T founder Charles Arthur Tilt and Agnes Josephine (née Morgan) Tilt, in 1956.

Patterson died on August 5, 1962.
