= Karl David Ilgen =

- Born: 26 February 1763; Sehna near Eckartsberga, Electorate of Saxony
- Died: 17 September 1834 (aged 71); Berlin, Prussia

Academic background
- Education: Leipzig University

Karl David Ilgen (26 February 1763 – 17 September 1834) was a German Old Testament scholar and classical philologist.

== Biography ==
He studied theology and philology at the University of Leipzig, and was later appointed rector at the munincipal gymnasium in Naumburg (1789). In 1794, he became a professor of oriental languages at the University of Jena. From 1802 to 1831, he was rector of the Landesschule Pforta.

Ilgen is credited as the first to use the term "epyllion" in classical literature, coining the term in 1796 when describing the Homeric "Hymn to Hermes".

== Works ==
- "Jobi antiquiss. carminis Hebraica natura atque virtutes", 1789.
- "Hymni Homerici cum reliquis carminibus minoribus Homero tributi solitis et Batrachomyomachia", 1796
- "Opuscula varia philologica", 1797.
- "Die Urkunden des ersten Buchs von Moses in ihrer Urgestalt", 1798 – The records of the first books of Moses in their original form.
- "Skolia, hoc est Carmina convivalia Graecorum", 1798.
- "Animadversiones philologicae et criticae in Carmen Virgilianum quod Copa inscribitum", 1820.
