= Herbert Parsons Patterson =

American banker (1925–1985)

President of Chase Manhattan Bank
- In office 1969–1972
- Preceded by: David Rockefeller
- Succeeded by: Willard C. Butcher

Personal details
- Born: September 3, 1925; Manhattan, New York
- Died: January 29, 1985 (aged 59); Manhattan, New York
- Spouse(s): Louise Sargent Oakey McVeigh (m. 1949; died 1968) Patricia Shepard Norris (after 1970)
- Relations: Rufus L. Patterson Jr. (grandfather); Herbert Parsons (grandfather); Elsie Clews Parsons (grandmother)
- Children: Katheryn Clews Patterson
- Parent(s): Morehead Patterson; Elsie Parsons
- Education: Groton School
- Alma mater: Yale University

Herbert Parsons Patterson (September 3, 1925 – January 29, 1985), was an American banker who served as president of the Chase Manhattan Bank.

== Early life ==
Patterson was born on September 3, 1925, at Sloan Maternity Hospital in New York City. He was the second son of Morehead Patterson and Elsie (née Parsons) Patterson (1901–1966). His elder brother was Rufus Lenoir Patterson III, a Lieutenant with the USAAF who was killed in action during World War II. His parents divorced in 1929 and his mother married John Drummond Kennedy in 1934. His father was an inventor who served as president and chairman of American Machine and Foundry.

His paternal grandparents were Rufus L. Patterson Jr., founder of AMF, and Margaret Warren (née Morehead) Patterson, a descendant of North Carolina Governor John Motley Morehead of Blandwood. His maternal grandparents were U.S. Representative Herbert Parsons and Elsie Clews Parsons (a daughter of British-American financier Henry Clews and Lucy Madison Worthington, a grandniece of President James Madison).

After graduating from the Groton School in 1942, he attended Yale University, where he earned a bachelor's degree in 1948. During World War II, he was a junior officer in the Navy serving in the Pacific.

== Career ==
In 1949, he joined Chase Manhattan Bank, where he spent his entire banking career. After a succession of posts, starting as an assistant manager and including assistant treasurer, vice president and executive vice president, he became president of the bank in 1968 when the previous president, David Rockefeller, also the bank's largest individual shareholder, became chairman and chief executive. Patterson was a trustee of the National Council on Crime and Delinquency, a member of the Council on Foreign Relations and the Mayor's Fiscal Advisory Committee. In 1972, after the bank was losing its competitive position and suffering a decline in earnings, he was replaced as president by Willard C. Butcher, and left the bank.

After Chase, he served as a financial consultant to Marshalsea Associates and then as president of the Stonover Company, a financial consulting firm he founded in 1977. He also served on the board of directors of AMF, the company founded by his grandfather and which was run by his father as well.

== Personal life ==
In July 1949, Patterson was married to Louise Sargent (née Oakey) McVeigh (1925–1968), an operatic and concert soprano, at the River Club. Louise, the widow of David Malcolm McVeigh, was a daughter of Francis Oakey of New York and The Studio in Southampton, New York. Her only attended was her sister, Joan Oakey Benjamin (wife of Samuel Nicoll Benjamin), (Note: Samuel Nicoll Benjamin (1915–2006) was a grandson of Union Army officer Samuel Nicoll Benjamin and great-grandson of New York Governor, Senator, and Secretary of State Hamilton Fish) and his best man was his cousin, Casimir de Rham Jr. (Note: His maternal aunt, Lucy Lathrop Patterson (1900–1977), had married Casimir de Rham, a descendant of Henry Casimir de Rham.) Louise's grandmother, Ellen (née Sargent) Oakey, was a cousin of the artist John Singer Sargent. Before her death in 1968, they were the parents of:

- Katheryn Clews Patterson, a Harvard Law School graduate who married Thomas L. Kempner Jr., co-founder of Davidson Kempner Capital Management, in 1979.

After the death of his first wife, he married Stanford graduate Patricia (née Shepard) Norris (1925–2016) in 1970 at the Dana Chapel of the Madison Avenue Presbyterian Church followed by a reception at the Colony Club. Patricia, the former wife of Bruce A. Norris (owner of the Detroit Red Wings), was a daughter of Chester Ames Shephard of New York and Pebble Beach, where he was a real‐estate investor. He was a member of the Racquet and Tennis Club and the Lenox Club.

Patterson died of pulmonary failure Tuesday at his home in New York City on January 29, 1985. After a funeral in New York, he was privately buried in Lenox, Massachusetts, where he was a trustee of the Lenox Library. After his death, Stonover, his family's estate in Lenox, (Note: Stonover was designed by Charles T. Rathbun in 1890 for his great-grandfather, John Edward Parsons, father of Herbert Parsons. Patterson's mother and stepfather, John D. Kennedy, a well-known conservationist after whom Kennedy Park in Lenox is named, lived at Stonover Farm.) was sold and today is operated as a bed and breakfast.
