= Heinrich Philipp Konrad Henke =

German theologian (1752–1809)

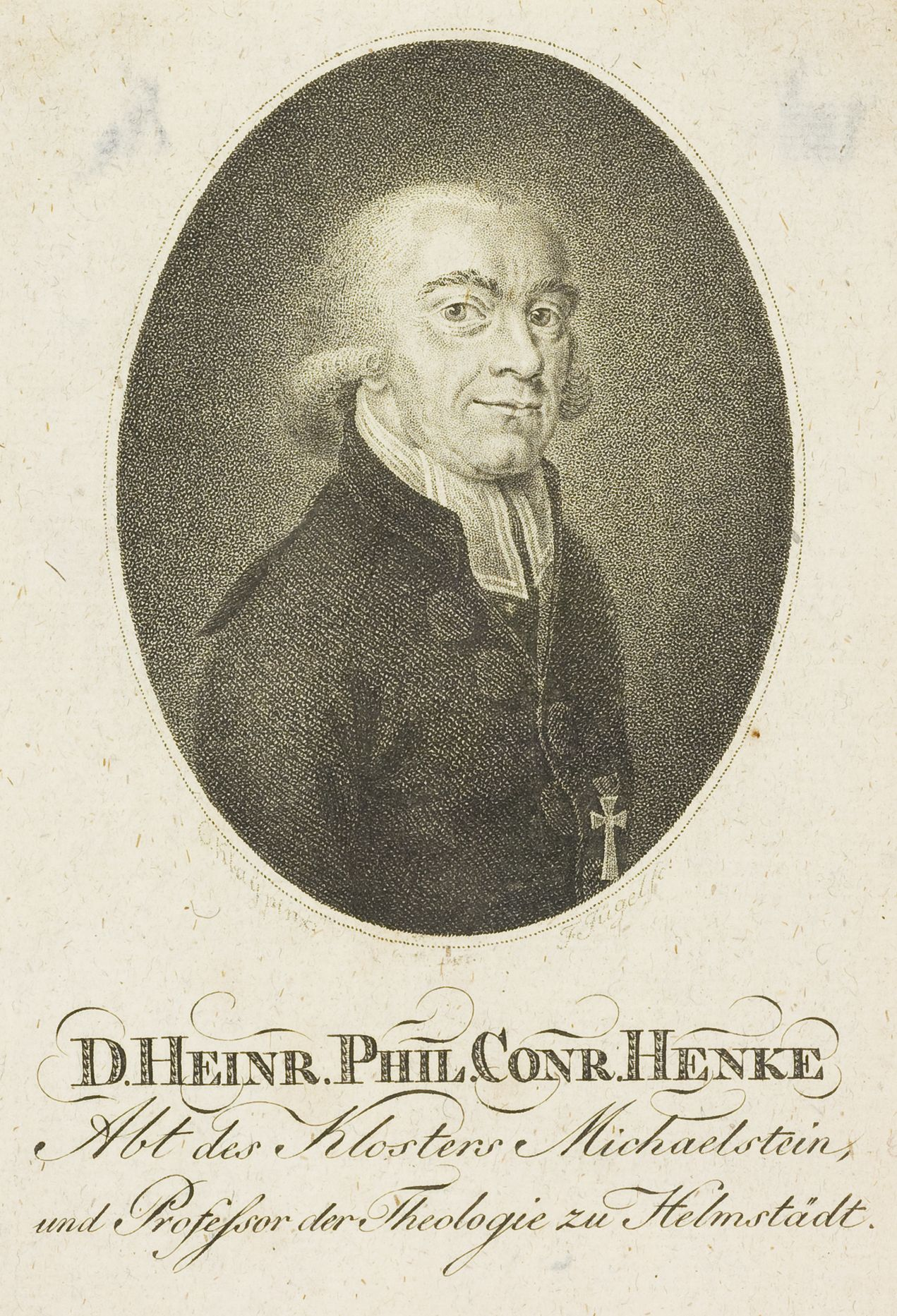
Heinrich Philipp Conrad Henke

Heinrich Philipp Konrad Henke (3 July 1752 – 2 May 1809), German theologian, best known as a writer on church history, was born at Hehlen, Brunswick-Lüneburg. He was the father of historian Ernst Ludwig Theodor Henke (1804–1872).

He received his education at the gymnasium in Braunschweig and at the University of Helmstedt. Until 1809, he was associated with the University of Helmstedt, named as an associate professor of philosophy in 1777 and of theology the following year. In 1780, he was chosen as a full professor of theology. During his tenure at Helmstedt, he was appointed abbot of Michaelstein Abbey (1786) and vice-president of the Carolinum in Braunschweig (1803).

Henke was a proponent of theological rationalism. His principal work, the multi-volume Allgemeine Geschichte der christlichen Kirche nach der Zeitfolge (General history of the Christian Church in chronological order) was praised by Ferdinand Christian Baur "as one of the most exquisite works of literature". Other noteworthy efforts by Henke include:

- "Lineamenta institutionum fidei Christianae historico-criticarum" (1793).
- "Opuscula academica, theologici potissimum argumenti" (1802).

Also, he was an editor of the Magazin für die Religionsphilosophie, Exegese und Kirchengeschichte (1793–1804) and the Archiv für die neueste Kirchengeschichte (1794–1799).
