= American Machine and Foundry =

Recreational equipment manufacturer (1900–1985)

- Fourth and final logo, used from 1970–1985, still used by AMF Bowling and its successors
- Trade name: AMF
- Type: Private
- Founded: 1900; 126 years ago Brooklyn, New York City
- Founder: Rufus L. Patterson Jr.
- Defunct: 1985; 41 years ago
- Fate: Assets sold off to other companies
- Successor: AMF Bowling; AMF Bakery Systems; AMF Reece
- Number of employees: 20,200 (1981); 17,300 (1982)

American Machine and Foundry (known after 1970 as AMF, Inc.) was one of the United States' largest recreational equipment companies, with diversified products as disparate as garden equipment, atomic reactors, and yachts.

== History ==
The company was founded in 1900 by Rufus L. Patterson Jr., inventor of the first automated cigarette manufacturing machine. Originally incorporated in New Jersey but operating in Brooklyn, New York City, the company began by manufacturing cigarette, baking, and stitching machines.

After World War II, AMF manufactured automated bowling equipment, and bowling centers became profitable business ventures. Bicycle production was added in 1950. The company was once a major manufacturer of products from tennis racquets to research reactors for the US "Atoms for Peace" program. AMF became a major part of what would soon be referred to by US president Dwight D. Eisenhower as "the military-industrial complex" after World War II.

In the late 1950s, the company's vice-chairman was Walter Bedell Smith. He was formerly a US major general, Eisenhower's wartime chief-of-staff, and Harry Truman's ambassador to the Soviet Union. Later he became the fourth director of the Central Intelligence Agency.

Until the mid-1980s, AMF's range of consumer goods included powered model airplanes, snow skis, lawn and garden equipment, Ben Hogan golf clubs, Voit inflatable balls, exercycles and exercise equipment, Paceship Yachts, Hatteras Yachts, Alcort Sailboats, Nimble bicycles, motorized bicycles, mopeds, and scuba gear. For a time, AMF owned Harley-Davidson motorcycles.

Aging production facilities and increasing quality control problems in some product lines caused sales declines in the late 1970s and early 1980s. The company's vast diversified output proved difficult to efficiently manage and, after suffering a series of losses, the company sold off its operations.

=== Bowling pinsetters and nuclear reactors ===
In 1943, Patterson's son, Morehead Patterson, took over AMF. After World War II ended, Patterson determined that the company had to "grow or die". One of AMF's post-World War II ventures was AMF Atomics: a division that made "low-dose irradiation equipment" for "the US Army Quartermaster Corps' bulk-food irradiation program". In a masterstroke of top executive recruitment, Patterson hired top US government cold warrior Walter Bedell Smith, whose leadership positions at the Pentagon, US State Department and CIA made AMF one of the pillars of the US military-industrial complex during the 1950s and 1960s. In the late 1950s, the company won a contract for designing and constructing "a small 1 MW swimming pool-type reactor" at the Soreq Nuclear Research Center in Israel, which for a short time helped the Israelis conceal the fact that they were also building the Negev Nuclear Research Center for military purposes elsewhere in the country with French assistance.

Patterson encountered a prototype of an automatic bowling pin setter in the 1940s. To get the cash to develop the invention, Patterson swapped AMF stock to acquire eight small companies with fast-selling products. After incorporating key features developed by Leslie L. LeVeque, the AMF Pinspotter was perfected and put on the market in 1952, and helped to turn bowling into the most popular US participative, competitive sport. AMF became a major manufacturer of pinsetters, bowling pins, bowling balls, and other bowling equipment, and owned and operated numerous bowling centers. AMF Bowling Products maintained its headquarters in Shelby, Ohio, until 1988.

=== Bicycle production ===
In 1950, after purchasing the Roadmaster line of children's and youth bicycles from the Cleveland Welding Company, American Machine and Foundry entered the bicycle manufacturing business with its newly formed AMF Wheel Goods Division. After a prolonged labor strike in 1953, AMF moved bicycle manufacturing from a UAW-organized plant in Cleveland, Ohio, to a new facility in Little Rock, Arkansas. The new plant was heavily automated and featured more than a mile of conveyor belts in six separate systems, including an electrostatic induction painting operation.

Taking advantage of the increase in its target markets in the aftermath of the baby boom, AMF was able to diversify its product line, adding exercise equipment under the brand name Vitamaster in 1950. As demand for bicycles continued to expand, the company needed a new manufacturing facility to keep up with demand. In 1962, the company moved its operations to Olney, Illinois, where it built a new factory on a 122-acre (0.49 km^{2}) site that would remain the company's principal bicycle manufacturing location until the 1990s.

After two decades of consistent growth, the AMF Wheel Goods Division stalled under the long-distance management of a parent company bogged down in layers of corporate management and marginally profitable product lines. Manufacturing quality as well as the technical standards of the Roadmaster bicycle line — once the pride of the company — had fallen to an all-time low. Bicycles made at the Olney plant were manufactured so poorly that some Midwestern bike shops refused to repair them, claiming that the bikes would not stay fixed no matter how much labor and effort was put into them. The division's problems with quality and outside competition were neatly summed up in a 1979 American film, Breaking Away, in which identical secondhand AMF Roadmaster track bicycles were used by competitors in the Little 500 bicycle race. Despite this product placement, the film's protagonist expressed a preference for his lightweight Italian Masi road racing bike, deriding the elderly Roadmaster as a "piece of junk".

In 1997, the Roadmaster bicycle division was sold to the Brunswick Corporation. However, it became evident that production of low-cost, mass-market bicycles in the US was not viable in the face of foreign competition, and in 1999, all U.S. production of Roadmaster bicycles ceased. Brunswick sold its bicycle division and the Roadmaster brand to Pacific Cycle, which began distributing a new Roadmaster line of bicycles imported from Taiwan and the People's Republic of China. Pacific Cycle still uses the Olney facility for corporate offices and as a product inventory and distribution center.

=== New product lines ===
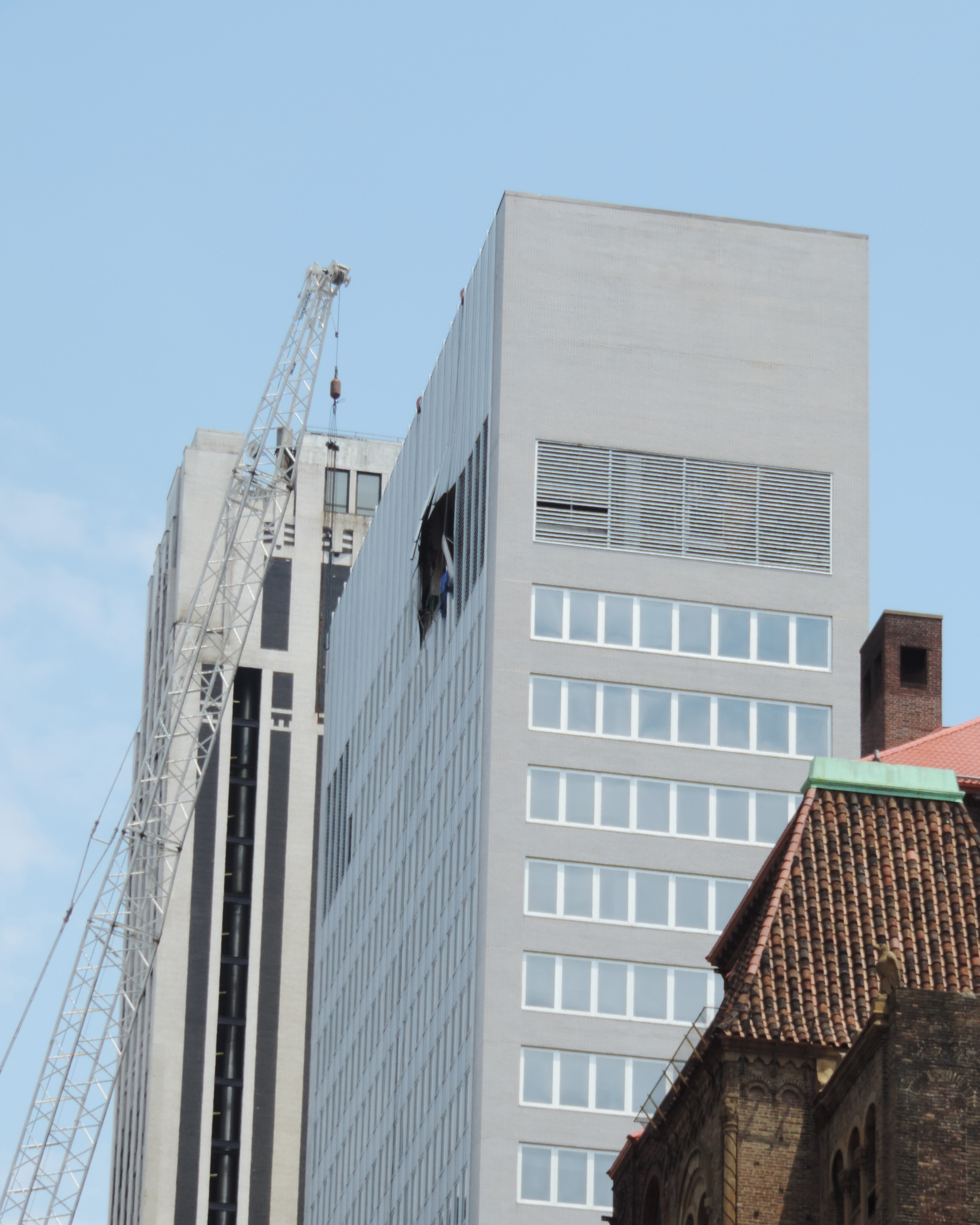
261 Madison Avenue, formerly the AMF Building

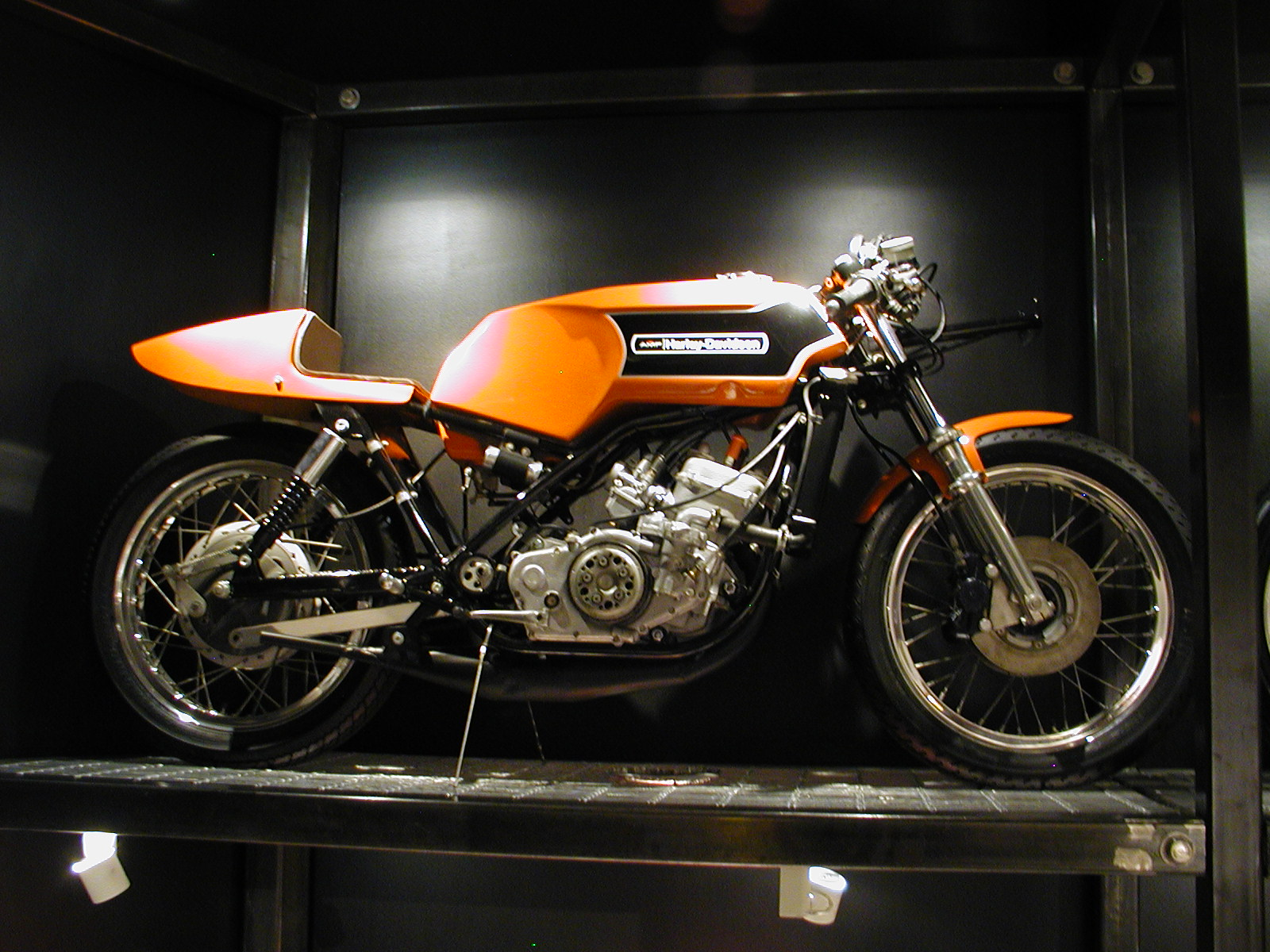
1975 AMF Harley-Davidson 250

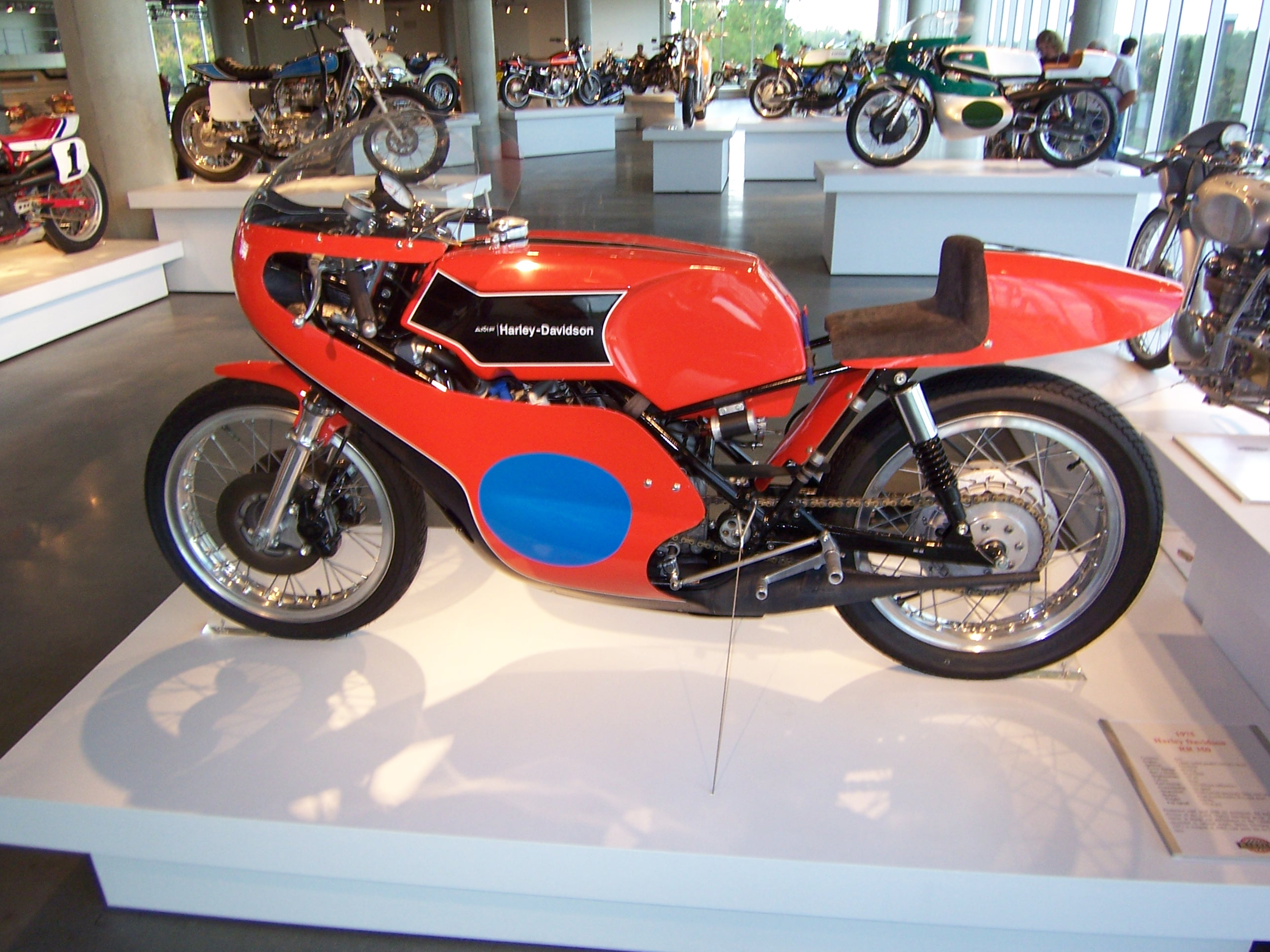
1975 AMF Harley-Davidson 350

In 1949, American Machine and Foundry developed a pretzel bender, an automatic baked pretzel-twisting machine that rolled and tied them at the rate of 50 a minute, more than twice as fast as skilled hand twisters. It then conveyed them through the baking and salting process. To expand its line of recreational equipment, AMF bought W. J. Voit Rubber Corp. (tread rubber, scuba gear), Ben Hogan Co. (golfing equipment), and Wen-Mac Corp. (engine-powered toy airplanes).

In 1954, the company acquired Potter and Brumfield, a manufacturer of electrical relays.

By 1961, AMF controlled and operated 42 plants and 19 research facilities in 17 different countries, producing everything from remote-controlled toy airplanes to ICBM launching systems. AMF was the builder of the launching silos for the Titan and Atlas ICBMs, and also developed the rail-car launching system for the solid-fueled Minuteman missile.

In the late 1950s and early 1960s, the company ran neck-and-neck with General Dynamics in the construction of nuclear power reactors. AMF sold Pakistan and Iran their first nuclear reactors. Peter Karter was among the engineers working on the reactors AMF built in Pakistan and Iran under the Atoms for Peace program.

In 1953, company headquarters moved into a new International Style-office tower at 261 Madison Avenue. Given naming rights, the AMF logo appeared in the Manhattan skyline. The bowling division ultimately outgrew the space and in 1960 moved to Long Island (Westbury, New York); corporate headquarters was relocated in 1971 to White Plains, New York.

In the early 1960s, American Machine and Foundry partnered with the French company SAFEGE to design, construct and market a monorail for American cities. The AMF Monorail was exhibited at the 1964 New York World's Fair, where it traversed a continuous elevated loop around the amusement section of the fair. It was displayed as a practical form of future transportation.

In 1971, American Machine and Foundry was renamed AMF. For many years, the company produced a wide variety of sport and leisure equipment, including Roadmaster bicycles, Harley-Davidson motorcycles (1969–1981), Head snow skis and tennis racquets (1969–1985), snowmobiles, lawn and garden equipment, (including manufacturing for Sears Craftsman. The models typically start with "536") Ben Hogan golf clubs (1960–1985), Voit inflatable balls, exercise equipment (including exercycles), motorized bicycles, mopeds, SlickCraft powerboats (1969–80), Alcort sailboats (including the Sunfish and the Hilu; 1969–86), Hatteras Yachts, and scuba gear.

In the late 1970s, in a reference to its numerous leisure product lines, the company began a TV advertising campaign centered on the slogan "AMF, we make weekends". For a short time, the company owned Dewalt Tools (1949–1960), and manufactured gymnastics equipment under the AMF brand. The gymnastics division was later spun off to form American Athletic (AAI) which used the same logo as AMF but with different text. New and improved exercycles, such as the Computrim line, the first to incorporate an electronic heart monitor, were introduced. AMF also acquired a recreational motor home division named Atlas Recreational Vehicles of Mason City, Iowa, which was disbanded after heavy losses following the fuel crisis of the early 1970s.

For a while the company made time switches, taking over the UK company Venner in 1970.

=== Decline ===
By the late 1970s, the company encountered difficulties. The absence of stable management (the company had seven presidents between 1972 and 1982), aging production facilities, rising labor costs, and the inability of AMF to operate efficiently and control its many product divisions from headquarters in White Plains, New York, contributed to a steady decline in sales and profits. Unlike large Japanese corporations such as Matsushita Electric Industrial (owners of the brand Panasonic), which had a standing corporate policy of discontinuing any product line or division in which they were not able to stay in first or second place in total market sales, AMF continued a practice of purchasing new companies in unfamiliar markets, while simultaneously failing to reorganize and modernize its core operations. As a result, during the late 1970s and early 1980s, the company lost an average of $8 million per year. Some subsidiaries were sold, including Harley-Davidson in 1981.

For a time, the Italian scuba diving equipment manufacturer Mares was part of AMF, and was able to secure the rights to the MR-12 regulator, previously made by Voit, and to continue manufacture of the regulator. Mares would revert to being an independent manufacturer after AMF was sold. It eventually became part of a worldwide consortium of sports equipment companies, including another former AMF division, Head.

In 1985, AMF was acquired through hostile takeover by Minstar Inc., a Minneapolis-based holding company controlled by investor Irwin L. Jacobs, and Jacobs began selling off its various divisions. Commonwealth Ventures, a group of private investors in Richmond, Virginia, paid $225 million to purchase AMF's bowling centers and bowling products divisions in 1985 to form AMF Bowling Companies, Inc. (later known as AMF Bowling Worldwide).
