= Devon Pritchard =

American businesswoman

5th President of Nintendo of America
- Incumbent
- Assumed office January 1, 2026
- Preceded by: Doug Bowser

Personal details
- Education: Kansas State University (BS); Gonzaga University (JD)
- Employer: Nintendo (2006–present)

Devon Pritchard is an American businesswoman who is the president and chief operating officer of Nintendo of America, the North American branch of the Japanese video game company Nintendo. She is the first woman to hold the title.

== Career ==
Pritchard joined Nintendo of America in 2006 as head of the legal department during the transition from president Tatsumi Kimishima to Reggie Fils-Aimé. She later took on leadership roles in marketing, business affairs, and publisher relations. In November 2021, she began acting as executive vice president of sales, marketing, and communications, a role made permanent in July 2022. In this position, she oversaw strategy and execution across the United States and Canada, including physical and digital sales growth, marketing, advertising, events, social media, and original content.

== Personal life ==
Pritchard earned a bachelor's degree in biological sciences from Kansas State University, where she also played on their volleyball team. In 2001, Pritchard obtained a doctorate in law from the Gonzaga University School of Law. She is married to Nathan Pritchard and together they have two children.

Business positions
| Preceded by Doug Bowser | President of Nintendo of America; 2026–present | Incumbent |
