= Focus Bikes =

German bicycle company

Focus
- Product type: Bicycles
- Current owner: Focus & Kalkhoff Holding
- Country: Germany
- Introduced: 1992; 34 years ago
- Related brands: Kalkhoff; Rixe
- Markets: Worldwide
- Website: focus-bikes.com

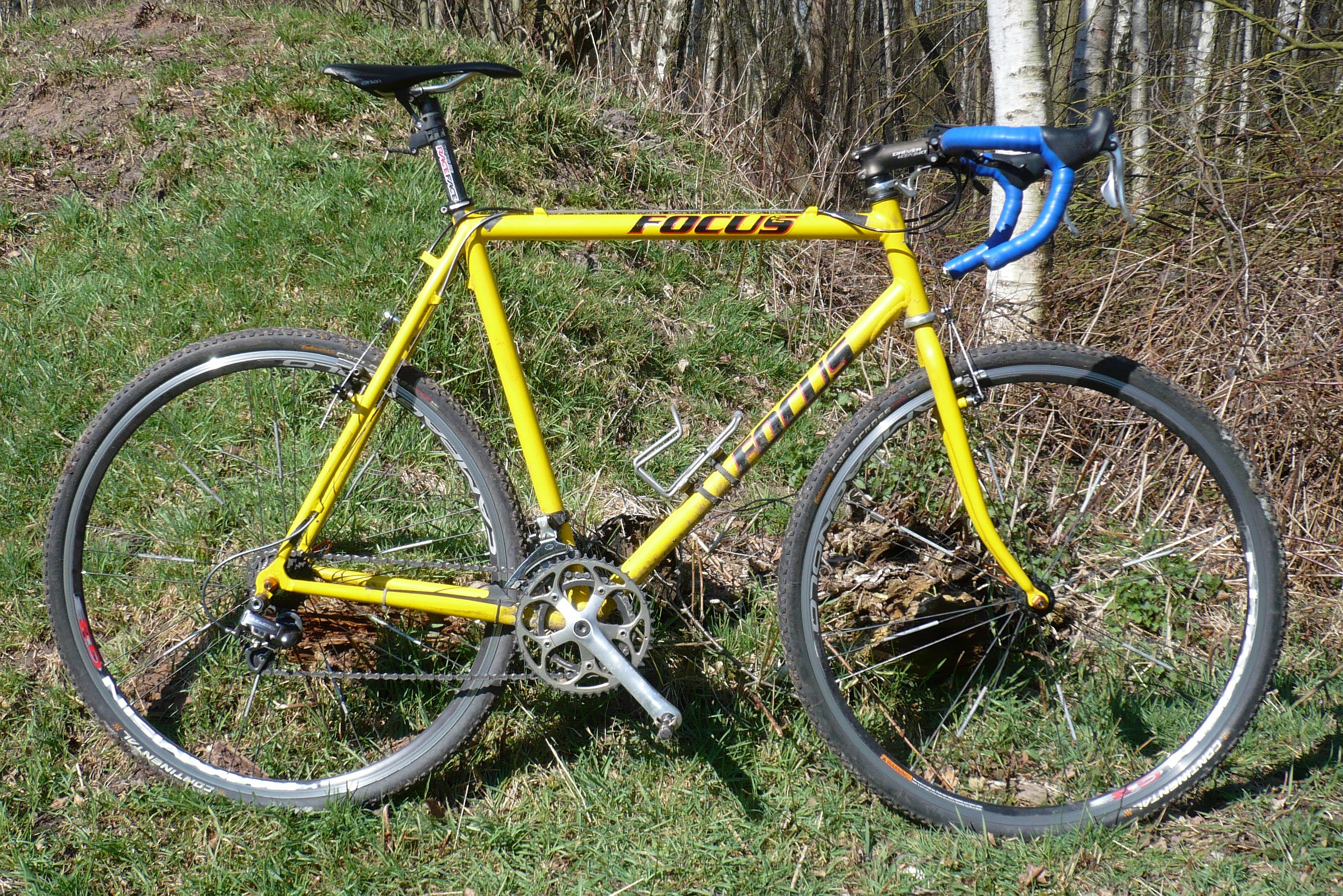
First generation Focus Cyclocross bike (2002)

Focus Bikes is a bicycle manufacturer that has its administration in Stuttgart, Germany and production facilities based in Cloppenburg, Germany and builds sport bicycles such as e-bikes, racing bicycles and mountain bicycles.

== History ==
The company was founded in 1993 by Mike Kluge, cyclocross World Champion.

In 1993 the company partnered with the manufacturer Derby Cycle Werke to produce bicycles.

In 1994 the first production line brought out 6 varieties of mountain bike.

In 1995 the company expanded to produce touring bicycles.

In 2003 the company began to produce racing bicycles.

In 2006 the company produced its first carbon fiber frames.

In 2008 a joint production effort between Andreas Walser saw the company produce a time trial bicycle and the same year produced a triathlon bicycle.

In 2009 the company set up subsidiaries in the United States and Italy, and began a European wide advertising campaign on Eurosport TV channel.

== Ownership ==
Focus is owned by Derby Cycle of Germany, which operates under ownership of the Pon Holdings Bicycle Group.

== Sponsorships & achievements ==
In 1993 Mike Kluge became German National Champion and runner-up World Champion riding a FOCUS bike.

In 1998 Jörg Arenz became the German cyclocross champion on a FOCUS bike.

In 2005 Hanka Kupfernagel became the cyclocross World Champion on a FOCUS Mares Team bike.

In 2008 four athletes sponsored by Focus won titles at the German Cyclocross Championships for juniors, women, 23-and-under, and elite.

In 2009 the company commenced a partnership with Team Milram. They will partner with Team Katusha for season 2011 since Team Milram will fold at the end of the 2010 season.

In 2010 the company sponsors racing teams such as Team Van Vliet, Team Jelly Belly and Team NetApp. They also sponsor mountain bike teams Team M.I.G. (Made in Germany) and an Italian amateur team Focus Italia. The company is also an official partner of the 2010 Tour de Suisse.

In 2011 the company began sponsoring Team Katusha, and continued sponsoring Team Jelly Belly and Women's Team VanderKitten.

In 2012 Focus parted company with Team Katusha, citing differing views on strategy, and partnered with the Italian team Acqua & Sapone.

In 2013 the company began sponsoring AG2R-La Mondiale, after Acqua & Sapone team folded after the end of 2012 season.

In 2016 Focus cyclocross athlete Jeremy Powers won his fourth USA National Championship.
