= Nintendo Direct =

Series of online presentations by Nintendo

- Main logo since 2017
- Japanese: ニンテンドーダイレクト
- Genre: Presentation
- Created by: Satoru Iwata
- Developed by: Nintendo
- Presented by: WW: Yoshiaki Koizumi; Previous presenters: WW: Satoru Iwata; NA: Reggie Fils-Aimé; NA: Bill Trinen; EU: Satoru Shibata; EU: Ed Valiente; AU: Tom Enoki; WW: Shinya Takahashi
- Countries of origin: Japan; North America; Europe; Australia
- Original languages: Japanese; English

Production
- Executive producers: Satoru Iwata (2011–2015); Tatsumi Kimishima (2015–2018); Shuntaro Furukawa (2018–present)
- Camera setup: Single-camera
- Running time: 5–60 minutes
- Production company: Nintendo

Original release
- Network: YouTube; Niconico; Twitch; Nintendo Today; Ustream (discontinued)
- Release: October 21, 2011 – present

Related
- Nintendo Power; Nintendo Space World; Nintendo Week

Nintendo Direct (Note: Nintendō Dairekuto (Japanese: ニンテンドーダイレクト)) is a series of online presentations or live shows produced by Nintendo, where information regarding the company's upcoming content or franchises is presented, such as information about games and consoles. The presentations began in Japan and North America with the first edition on October 21, 2011, before expanding to Europe, Australia, and South Korea.

== Format ==
Nintendo Direct presentations vary in format between different presentations and regions.

=== Regional differences ===
Nintendo Directs generally come in both regional and international formats.

==== International ====
For subjects of a general worldwide appeal, a single main Nintendo Direct is often localized for a simultaneous international broadcast. Usually, these will be recorded in Japanese and presented by a Japanese presenter. Prior to Nintendo president Satoru Iwata's death, he would host Directs in both English and Japanese, with other languages' presentations being subtitled.

Upon Iwata's death, the main Nintendo Directs did not receive a worldwide host until 2017, when Senior General Manager Yoshiaki Koizumi from Nintendo Entertainment Planning & Development took over this role. Since 2018, Koizumi has shared this responsibility with Shinya Takahashi, the Executive General Manager of Nintendo EPD. From September 2023 to March 2025, Takahashi was the sole host of the main Nintendo Directs; Koizumi would not host another main Nintendo Direct until September 2025. E3 Directs sometimes featured Reggie Fils-Aimé as a host for a short period of time until his departure in 2019.

Since 2017, the Japanese presenter and any narrators' roles are dubbed or subtitled for international release, including into English.

Presentations scheduled for around the time of the Electronic Entertainment Expo were originally produced by Nintendo of America, presented in English and dubbed or subtitled into other languages for international broadcast. From 2019 until the last event in 2021, E3 Directs were produced by Nintendo in Japan, presented in Japanese and dubbed or subtitled into other languages for international broadcast.

==== Japan ====
In Japan, Nintendo Directs were most commonly presented by Nintendo's global president Satoru Iwata until his death in 2015. Yoshiaki Koizumi started serving as host for the main Nintendo Directs in 2017. Shinya Takahashi started sharing the hosting duties with Koizumi in 2018. From March 2018 to September 2019, Koizumi only hosted the Directs in the first half of the year, while Takahashi hosted the Directs in the second half of the year. From February 2021 to September 2022, this format for Directs was switched with Takahashi hosting the Directs in the first half of the year and Koizumi hosting the Directs in the second half of the year. The E3 2021 and June 2023 Directs (the latter of which was the last that Koizumi hosted until September 2025) had both hosts appear at the same time. From September 2023 to June 2026, one host would be part of a number of consecutive Directs, each held every nine months.

Since 2017, Japan has hosted region-specific "Indie World" presentations, focusing on indie games published for Nintendo Switch.

Directs focused on Super Smash Bros. and Kirby Air Riders are typically hosted by Masahiro Sakurai, the creator and director of the Super Smash Bros series, the creator of the Kirby series, and the director of Kirby Air Ride and its sequel, Kirby Air Riders.

==== North America ====
In North America, the videos were often presented by Nintendo of America president, Reggie Fils-Aimé (before he retired in 2019), and Bill Trinen.

For international Directs produced in Japan since 2017, Nintendo of America airs the original Japanese audio with English narration; although two notable exceptions of having it subtitled instead of dubbed were the Mr. Sakurai Presents presentations starting with "Min Min" from Arms in 2020 and up until the final presentation with "Sora" from Kingdom Hearts in 2021 (with the sole exception of Sakurai's appearance in the 2021 E3 Nintendo Direct following Kazuya's reveal), as well as the Super Nintendo World Directs hosted by Shigeru Miyamoto. This was due to the COVID-19 pandemic, which made it difficult to record the voice-overs. Despite pandemic restrictions easing since then, the Kirby Air Riders Directs hosted by Sakurai as well as the Ninendo Museum Direct were also subtitled instead of dubbed.

Since 2017, Nintendo of America has aired presentations focusing on indie games published for Nintendo Switch. Between 2017 and 2019, these were branded as "Nindies Showcase" hosted by Trinen, before aligning their branding to the Japanese "Indie World" banner.

==== Europe and Australia ====
European Directs were presented by former Nintendo of Europe president, Satoru Shibata. These presentations were also broadcast in Australia.

Australia only aired the European output, but one Direct was created specifically for the region, broadcast on September 24, 2014. This Direct was hosted by Tom Enoki.

For international Directs produced in Japan since 2017, Nintendo of Europe and Nintendo Australia air the original Japanese audio for the presenters, but use an English dub for the narrated sections. These are then subtitled for broadcast in other languages. Since 2019, the "Pokémon Direct"/"Pokémon Presents" are the only Directs that are dubbed for Europe and Australia in English, however, they are subtitled in different languages with the English dub.

Since 2017, Nintendo of Europe has broadcast presentations focusing on indie games published for Nintendo Switch. From 2017 to 2018, Nintendo of Europe broadcast the American "Nindies Showcase" presentations. In 2018 and 2019, Nintendo of Europe hosted its own "Indie Highlights" videos. Since 2019, they returned to broadcasting Nintendo of America's presentations, now under the "Indie World" banner, with Nintendo Australia broadcasting later on.

==== South Korea ====
South Korea also aired exclusive Nintendo Directs hosted by Nintendo of Korea president, Hiroyuki Fukuda.

==== Hong Kong and Taiwan ====
A few Nintendo Direct presentations were produced specifically for Hong Kong and Taiwan.

=== Types ===
Outside of the general Nintendo Direct presentations, which cover a range of titles, there are also Directs centred around specific titles or series. These are usually presented by the producer or director of the game or series, or employ a narrator.

List of Nintendo Direct presentation types
Type	Duration	Content
Nintendo Direct	25–60 minutes	The main type of Nintendo Direct presentation. Showcases information about software and hardware across all Nintendo platforms. In 2017, the series transitioned to a format showcasing games in quick headlines while showcasing particular upcoming first and third-party titles in dedicated segments.
Nintendo Direct Mini	5–30 minutes	A shorter version of the main type of Nintendo Direct that showcases information about software and hardware across all Nintendo platforms but may focus on some smaller releases. In 2018, the hosts of this Nintendo Direct were removed as the series transitioned to a format showcasing games in quick headlines while showcasing particular upcoming first and third-party titles in substantial presentations. This type of Nintendo Direct, unlike the main type of Nintendo Direct, is usually shadow dropped, being aired without any prior announcement beforehand. Nintendo Direct Mini has not been hosted since a Partner Showcase in 2022, and a full Nintendo Direct Mini has not occurred since 2020.
Nintendo Direct Partner Showcase	5–30 minutes	A variation of the main type of Nintendo Direct that showcases information about software on Nintendo platforms from third-party developers and publishers, including titles published by Nintendo from external studios. From 2020 to 2022, Nintendo adopted the Direct Mini format to deliver game information to its audience in lieu of being able to produce traditional Directs with the conditions of the COVID-19 pandemic, which included several dedicated Direct Mini presentations for titles coming to Nintendo Switch from their publishing partners. Long-form Partner Showcase presentations with the duration of a standard Nintendo Direct began in 2024.
Nintendo Direct special	5–50 minutes	A presentation that covers specific software titles, both from Nintendo and third-party developers. Usually hosted by the game's producer or director or makes use of a narrator. Each Direct of this type has its own logo.
Pokemon Presents	10–27 minutes	A presentation focusing on the Pokémon franchise, including games for Nintendo consoles and mobile devices. Succeeding the prior "Pokémon Direct" presentations from 2013 to 2020, these events are organized by The Pokémon Company without direct involvement from Nintendo unlike the former.
Indie World	15–28 minutes	A presentation focusing on titles by independent developers coming to Nintendo Switch and Nintendo Switch 2. This type of Nintendo Direct was originally only shown in Japan but later added to North America and Europe.
Discontinued Nintendo Direct presentation types
Nintendo Direct Micro	17 minutes	A one-off presentation in 2015 that covered software and hardware across all Nintendo platforms. This type of Nintendo Direct was only shown in North America and has since been discontinued.
Nintendo 3DS Direct	30–50 minutes	A Nintendo Direct specifically concerning software and hardware related to the Nintendo 3DS family of consoles. This type of Nintendo Direct was discontinued after its run from 2013 to 2016, although Nintendo 3DS games appeared outside of this type until 2019 following the hardware family's discontinuation.
Wii U Direct	30–50 minutes	A Nintendo Direct specifically concerning software and hardware related to the Wii U console. Running in 2012 and 2013, this type of Nintendo Direct was discontinued following the end of Wii U production prior to the launch of the Nintendo Switch.
Nindies Showcase	10–30 minutes	A presentation focusing on titles by independent developers coming to Nintendo Switch. This specific presentation type was only shown in North America and Europe. This type of Nintendo Direct ran from 2017 to 2019 and was replaced by "Indie Highlights" in Europe in 2018 before both were replaced by "Indie World" worldwide.
Indie Highlights	17–23 minutes	A presentation focusing on titles by independent developers coming to Nintendo Switch. This specific presentation type was only shown in Europe. This type of Nintendo Direct ran from 2018 to 2019 and was replaced by "Indie World".
Nintendo E3 Presentations/Directs	20–45 minutes	A presentation on upcoming first/third party games that aired live during E3. The presentation covered games that would release sometime between E3 and the end of the calendar year. Each Direct of this type had its own logo. There were no presentations of this type in 2016, as well as in 2020 and 2022 (due to E3 being cancelled these years because of the COVID-19 pandemic) and in 2023 (because all major publishers including Nintendo pulled out of the event that year). This type of Nintendo Direct was discontinued when the Entertainment Software Association (ESA) permanently discontinued E3 in December 2023.

==== Nintendo E3 Directs ====
From June 2013 to June 2021, in lieu of traditional large-scale Electronic Entertainment Expo (E3) press conferences, Nintendo opted to utilize the Nintendo Direct platform as an alternative method of conveying its news. Speaking at an annual March financial results briefing just two months prior, Nintendo CEO Satoru Iwata stated that the company's decision was determined by the fact that "different people demand different types of information", and that the Nintendo Direct platform had established itself to the point that Nintendo would "be able to deliver [their] messages more appropriately and effectively … based on the various needs of different groups of people". Christopher Dring of GamesIndustry.biz observed that the last press conference that Nintendo held at E3 in 2012 featured too much of a mix between Nintendo's new hardware for the Wii U and game announcements. Compared to other press conferences held that year, Nintendo's presentation left little for fans of the company to be excited for. By switching to Nintendo Directs, Dring opined that the company was able to better connect to fans using the Nintendo Direct presentations, made the faces of Nintendo's executives more visible, as well as having Directs outside of the E3 cycle to provide more frequent updates on game and hardware releases.

During the stream of the pre-recorded broadcast for E3 2013, Nintendo's website suffered from technical difficulties in the form of overloaded servers, rendering the live video unwatchable for many viewers, and prompting an official apology from Satoru Iwata. Despite these difficulties, Nintendo of America President Reggie Fils-Aimé noted that secondary viewership following the initial broadcast still worked to popularize product promotion.

The following year, in addition to the Direct, the company added "Nintendo Treehouse: Live @ E3" live streams to their presence at the trade event. Named after the Product Development department at Nintendo of America, these were daily streams from the show floor that featured NoA localization staff and game developers demoing and giving in-depth coverage of titles that were announced during that year's Direct. The year also began a trend of Nintendo hosting a game tournament sometime during the week, in which the participants competed in titles that had yet to be released.

List of Nintendo E3 events
Year	Title	Summary
2014	Super Smash Bros. Invitational	Sixteen professional Super Smash Bros. players get invited to play Super Smash Bros. for Wii U.
2015	Nintendo World Championships 2015	Sixteen players, eight chosen from qualifying competitions throughout the United States and invited by Nintendo, compete in various Nintendo games, with the final game being Super Mario Maker.
2016	—N/a	Nintendo lacked both an E3 tournament and an E3 presentation this year, only having Nintendo Treehouse Live streams that focused mainly on The Legend of Zelda: Breath of the Wild and Nintendo 3DS games.
2017	Splatoon 2 World Inkling Invitational	Professional Splatoon teams from the United States, Japan, Europe and Australia/New Zealand compete in a round-robin tournament with Splatoon 2's Turf War and Ranked Battle modes.
2017	Pokkén Tournament DX Invitational	Four two-player teams consisting of YouTube and Twitch personalities compete, with one member of each team using one of the new characters added for the Pokkén Tournament DX's Nintendo Switch release.
2017	Arms Open Invitational	Four attendees at E3 2017 compete against four professional fighting game players in a single elimination format with the various gameplay modes in Arms.
2018	Splatoon 2 World Championship Finals	Splatoon representatives from the United States, Canada, Australia, New Zealand, Europe and Japan, compete in a series of ranked matches in Splatoon 2 for the grand prize at E3 2018.
2018	Super Smash Bros. Invitational 2018	Professional Super Smash Bros. players and selected attendees at E3 2018 get to play the upcoming Super Smash Bros. Ultimate title for the Nintendo Switch.
2019	Super Mario Maker 2 Invitational 2019	Special guests invited by Nintendo get to play a wide variety of newly made courses in the upcoming Super Mario Maker 2.
2019	Splatoon 2 World Championship 2019	Splatoon teams from North America, Europe, Australia/New Zealand and Japan, each the winners of their respective tournaments, battle in Splatoon 2 after a year of events to be given the world number one title at E3 2019.
2019	Super Smash Bros. Ultimate World Championship 2019 3v3	Qualified Super Smash Bros. teams of three from each of North America, Europe, Australia/New Zealand and Japan compete against each other in Super Smash Bros. Ultimate after each winning their regional tournaments.

After E3 2019, the COVID-19 pandemic impacted the video game industry. E3 2020 was cancelled in March 2020 due to the pandemic, E3 2021 was held online, with Nintendo only holding an E3 Direct and Treehouse Live streams, and E3 2022 was cancelled in March 2022. Nintendo also pulled out of E3 2023, which was cancelled in March 2023 due to the "lack of sustained interest". The Entertainment Software Association (ESA) permanently discontinued E3 in December 2023, leading to more standalone publisher-specific showcases, including main Nintendo Directs with headlines. Following E3's discontinuation, Summer Game Fest took over as the tentpole summer video game showcase, and while a Nintendo Direct is often still shown in June around the time of the event, Nintendo is not affiliated or a partner of Summer Game Fest as of 2026 and has mostly avoided the show, though Geoff Keighley had expressed interest in Nintendo becoming a bigger part of the event in the future.

== List of presentations ==
Alongside Nintendo Direct presentations, other Nintendo-produced online presentations without "Direct" in its name are listed.

=== Key ===
Nintendo Direct
Nintendo Direct held at E3
Nintendo Direct Mini
Nintendo Direct for a single game or game series
Wii U Direct
Pokémon Direct (formerly)/Pokémon Presents
Nintendo 3DS Direct
Year of Luigi
Super Smash Bros. Direct
Nintendo Direct Micro
Nindies Showcase/Indie Highlights/Indie World
Super Nintendo World Direct
The Super Mario Bros. Movie Direct
The Super Mario Galaxy Movie Direct
Nintendo Direct: Partner Showcase
Nintendo Museum Direct

=== 2011 ===
Broadcast type	Coverage	Date	Regions	Ref.
Nintendo Direct	Nintendo 3DS and Wii games	October 21, 2011	Japan, North America	
Nintendo Direct	Nintendo 3DS and Wii games	December 27, 2011	Japan	

=== 2012 ===
Broadcast type	Coverage	Date	Regions	Ref.
Nintendo Direct	Nintendo 3DS and Wii games	February 22, 2012	Japan, North America, Europe, Australia	
Nintendo Direct	Nintendo 3DS and Super Mario 3D Land	April 14, 2012	South Korea	
Nintendo Direct	Nintendo 3DS and Wii games	April 21, 2012	Japan, Europe, Australia	
Nintendo Direct Pre E3 2012	Wii U built-in software	June 3, 2012	Japan, North America, Europe, Australia	
Nintendo Direct	Nintendo 3DS XL reveal Nintendo 3DS and Wii games	June 21, 2012	Japan, North America, Europe, Australia	
Nintendo Direct Mini	Brain Age: Concentration Training	July 18, 2012	Japan	
Nintendo Direct	Dragon Quest X	July 30, 2012	Japan	
Nintendo Direct	Nintendo 3DS and Wii games	August 29, 2012	Japan	
Nintendo Direct Mini	Brain Age: Concentration Training	September 7, 2012	Japan	
Wii U Direct	Wii U games	September 13, 2012	Japan, Europe, Australia	
Nintendo Direct Mini	New Super Mario Bros. 2	September 28, 2012	Japan	
Nintendo Direct Mini	New Super Mario Bros. 2	October 2, 2012	North America, Europe, Australia	
Nintendo Direct Mini	Nintendo 3DS XL & Nintendo eShop	October 3, 2012	Japan	
Nintendo Direct	Nintendo 3DS games	October 4, 2012	Europe, Australia	
Nintendo Direct	Animal Crossing: New Leaf	October 5, 2012	Japan	
Nintendo Direct	Nintendo 3DS games	October 25, 2012	Japan, North America	
Nintendo Direct	Nintendo 3DS games	October 31, 2012	South Korea	
Wii U Direct	Wii U, system apps and games	November 7, 2012	Japan, North America, Europe, Australia	
Wii U Direct	Wii U interface and Miiverse	November 14, 2012	Japan, North America	
Nintendo Direct Mini	New Super Mario Bros. 2	November 27, 2012	Japan, North America, Europe, Australia	
Nintendo Direct	Wii U and Nintendo 3DS games	December 5, 2012	Japan, North America, Europe, Australia	
Wii U Direct	Niconico	December 6, 2012	Japan	
Nintendo Direct Mini	Dragon Quest X	December 19, 2012	Japan	

=== 2013 ===
Broadcast type	Coverage	Date	Regions	Ref.
Pokémon Direct	Pokémon X and Y	January 8, 2013	Japan, North America, Europe, Australia	
Wii U Direct	Wii U games, Miiverse and Virtual Console	January 23, 2013	Japan, North America, Europe, Australia	
Nintendo Direct	Animal Crossing: New Leaf	January 24, 2013	South Korea	
Nintendo Direct	Animal Crossing: New Leaf	February 1, 2013	Japan	
Nintendo 3DS Direct	Year of Luigi and Nintendo 3DS games	February 14, 2013	Japan, North America, Europe, Australia	
Nintendo 3DS Direct	Nintendo 3DS games	February 21, 2013	Japan	
Nintendo Direct Mini	Tomodachi Collection: New Life	March 12, 2013	Japan	
Nintendo Direct Mini	Flipnote Studio 3D	March 13, 2013	Japan, North America, Europe, Australia	
Nintendo Direct Mini	Nintendo 3DS games	April 1, 2013	Japan	
Nintendo Direct	Tomodachi Collection: New Life	April 3, 2013	Japan	
Nintendo Direct	Year of Luigi and Nintendo 3DS games	April 17, 2013	Japan, North America, Europe, Australia	
Nintendo Direct (Note: The Sega-related section of the Japanese version was shown standalone, under the title Sega Direct.)	Wii U and Nintendo 3DS games	May 17, 2013	Japan, North America, Europe, Australia	
Nintendo Direct	Monster Hunter 4 Phoenix Wright: Ace Attorney − Dual Destinies	May 27, 2013	Japan	
Nintendo Direct @ E3 2013	Wii U and Nintendo 3DS games	June 11, 2013	Japan, North America, Europe, Australia, South Korea	
Nintendo Direct	Pikmin 3	June 26, 2013	Japan	
Nintendo Direct Mini	Nintendo 3DS and Wii U games	July 3, 2013	Japan	
Nintendo Direct Mini	Nintendo 3DS and Wii U games	July 18, 2013	North America, Europe, Australia	
Nintendo Direct	Wii U and Nintendo 3DS games	August 7, 2013	Japan, North America, Europe, Australia	
Nintendo Direct	The Wonderful 101	August 9, 2013	Japan, North America, Europe, Australia	
Pokémon Direct	Pokémon X and Y	September 4, 2013	Japan, North America, Europe, Australia	
Nintendo Direct	Monster Hunter 4	September 8, 2013	Japan	
Nintendo Direct	Wii Fit U	September 18, 2013	Japan, North America, Europe, Australia	
Nintendo Direct	Wii U and Nintendo 3DS games	October 1, 2013	Japan, North America, Europe, Australia	
Nintendo Direct	Pokémon X and Y Monster Hunter 4	October 10, 2013	South Korea	
Nintendo Direct Mini	Daigasso! Band Brothers P	October 29, 2013	Japan	
Nintendo Direct	Monster Hunter 4	November 12, 2013	South Korea	
Nintendo Direct	Nintendo 3DS and Wii U games	November 13, 2013	North America, Europe, Australia	
Nintendo Direct Mini	Nintendo 3DS and Wii U Download software	November 14, 2013	Japan	
Nintendo Direct	Nintendo 3DS Guide: Louvre District	November 27, 2013	Japan, North America, Europe, Australia	
Nintendo Direct	Wii U and Nintendo 3DS games	December 18, 2013	Japan, North America, Europe, Australia	

=== 2014 ===
Broadcast type	Coverage	Date	Regions	Ref.
Nintendo Direct	Nintendo 3DS games	January 17, 2014	South Korea	
Nintendo Direct	Wii U and Nintendo 3DS games	February 13, 2014	Japan, North America, Europe, Australia	
Super Smash Bros. Direct	Super Smash Bros. for Nintendo 3DS and Wii U	April 8, 2014	Japan, North America, Europe, Australia	
Nintendo Direct	Tomodachi Life	April 10, 2014	North America, Europe, Australia	
Nintendo Direct	Mario Kart 8	April 30, 2014	Japan, North America, Europe, Australia	
Nintendo Direct	Tomodachi Life	May 29, 2014	South Korea	
Nintendo Digital Event @ E3 2014	Wii U and Nintendo 3DS games	June 10, 2014	Japan, North America, Europe, Australia, South Korea	
Nintendo Direct	Yo-kai Watch 2	July 4, 2014	Japan	
Nintendo 3DS Direct	Nintendo 3DS games	July 11, 2014	Japan	
Nintendo Direct	Hyrule Warriors	August 4, 2014	Japan, North America, Europe, Australia	
Nintendo 3DS Direct	Nintendo 3DS games	August 29, 2014	Japan	
Nintendo Direct	Bayonetta 2	September 4, 2014	Japan, North America, Europe, Australia	
Nintendo 3DS Direct	New Nintendo 3DS reveal	September 24, 2014	Australia	
Nintendo Direct	Monster Hunter 4G	October 8, 2014	Japan	
Super Smash Bros. for Wii U 50-Fact Extravaganza	Super Smash Bros. for Wii U	October 23, 2014	Japan, North America, Europe, Australia	
Nintendo Direct	Wii U and Nintendo 3DS games	November 5, 2014	Japan, North America, Europe, Australia	

=== 2015 ===
Broadcast type	Coverage	Date	Regions	Ref.
Nintendo Direct	New Nintendo 3DS reveal Wii U and Nintendo 3DS games	January 14, 2015	Japan, North America, Europe, Australia	
Nintendo Direct	Xenoblade Chronicles X	February 6, 2015	Japan	
Nintendo Direct	New Nintendo 3DS reveal and 3DS games	March 19, 2015	South Korea	
Nintendo Direct	Wii U and Nintendo 3DS games	April 1, 2015	Japan, North America, Europe, Australia	
Nintendo Direct	Xenoblade Chronicles X	April 24, 2015	North America	
Nintendo Direct	Splatoon	May 7, 2015	Japan, North America, Europe, Australia	
Nintendo Direct	Wii U and Nintendo 3DS games	May 31, 2015	Japan	
Nintendo Direct Micro	Nintendo 3DS games	June 1, 2015	North America	
Super Smash Bros. for Nintendo 3DS / Wii U – New Content Approaching	Super Smash Bros. for Nintendo 3DS and Wii U DLC	June 14, 2015	Japan, North America, Europe, Australia, South Korea	
Nintendo Digital Event @ E3 2015	Wii U and Nintendo 3DS games	June 16, 2015	Japan, North America, Europe, Australia, South Korea	
Nintendo Direct	Wii U and Nintendo 3DS games	November 12, 2015	Japan, North America, Europe, Australia	
Super Smash Bros. for 3DS / Wii U – Final Video Presentation	Super Smash Bros. for Nintendo 3DS and Wii U DLC	December 15, 2015	Japan, North America, Europe, Australia, South Korea	

=== 2016 ===
Broadcast type	Coverage	Date	Regions	Ref.
Pokémon Direct	20th anniversary celebration Pokémon Sun and Moon; Pokémon Red, Blue, and Yellow (Virtual Console)	February 26, 2016	Japan, North America, Europe, Australia, South Korea, Hong Kong, Taiwan	
Nintendo Direct	Wii U and Nintendo 3DS games	March 3, 2016	Japan, North America, Europe, Australia	
Nintendo Direct	Culdcept Revolt	May 11, 2016	Japan	
Nintendo Direct	Culdcept Revolt	June 22, 2016	Japan	
Nintendo 3DS Direct	Nintendo 3DS games	September 1, 2016	Japan, North America, Europe, Australia	
Nintendo Direct	Monster Hunter XX	October 27, 2016	Japan	
Nintendo Direct	Animal Crossing: New Leaf – Welcome amiibo	November 2, 2016	Japan, North America, Europe, Australia	
Nintendo Direct	Miitopia	November 5, 2016	Japan	

=== 2017 ===
Broadcast type	Coverage	Date	Regions	Ref.
Nintendo Direct	Fire Emblem Heroes; Fire Emblem Echoes: Shadows of Valentia; Fire Emblem Warriors; Fire Emblem: Three Houses	January 18, 2017	Japan, North America, Europe, Australia	
Special Video from Producer of Fire Emblem	Fire Emblem Heroes; Fire Emblem Echoes: Shadows of Valentia; Fire Emblem Warriors; Fire Emblem: Three Houses	February 13, 2017	Hong Kong, Taiwan	
Nindies Showcase	Indie games for the Nintendo Switch	February 28, 2017	North America, Europe	
Nintendo Direct	Nintendo Switch and Nintendo 3DS games, with a focus on Arms and Splatoon 2	April 12, 2017	Japan, North America, Europe, Australia	
Nintendo Direct	Arms (plus a small segment on Splatoon 2)	May 17, 2017	Japan, North America, Europe, Australia	
Pokémon Direct	Pokkén Tournament DX; Pokémon Ultra Sun and Ultra Moon; Pokémon Gold and Silver (Virtual Console)	June 6, 2017	Japan, North America, Europe, Australia, Hong Kong	
Nintendo Spotlight: E3 2017	Nintendo Switch and Nintendo 3DS games	June 13, 2017	Japan, North America, Europe, Australia, Hong Kong	
Nintendo Direct	Dragon Quest XI	June 21, 2017	Japan	
Nintendo Direct	Splatoon 2	July 6, 2017	Japan, North America, Europe, Australia	
Nindies Showcase	Indie games for the Nintendo Switch	August 30, 2017	North America	
Nintendo Direct	Nintendo Switch and Nintendo 3DS games, with a focus on Xenoblade Chronicles 2 and Super Mario Odyssey	September 13, 2017	Japan, North America, Europe, Australia	
Mobile Direct	Animal Crossing: Pocket Camp	October 24, 2017	Japan, North America, Europe, Australia	
Nintendo Direct	Xenoblade Chronicles 2	November 7, 2017	Japan, North America, Europe, Australia	

=== 2018 ===
Broadcast type	Coverage	Date	Regions	Ref.
Nintendo Direct Mini	Spring-Summer 2018 Nintendo Switch games	January 11, 2018	Japan, North America, Europe, Australia	
Nintendo Direct	Nintendo Switch and Nintendo 3DS games, with a focus on Mario Tennis Aces	March 8, 2018	Japan, North America, Europe, Australia	
Nindies Showcase	Indie games for the Nintendo Switch	March 20, 2018	North America	
Indie World	Indie games for the Nintendo Switch	May 11, 2018	Japan	
Nintendo Direct: E3 2018	Nintendo Switch games, with a focus on Super Smash Bros. Ultimate	June 12, 2018	Japan, North America, Europe, Australia, South Korea, Hong Kong, Taiwan	
Super Smash Bros. Ultimate Direct	Super Smash Bros. Ultimate	August 8, 2018	Japan, North America, Europe, Australia, South Korea, Hong Kong, Taiwan	
Indie Highlights	Indie games for the Nintendo Switch	August 20, 2018	Europe	
Nindies Showcase	Indie games for the Nintendo Switch	August 28, 2018	North America	
Mobile Direct	Dragalia Lost	August 29, 2018	Japan, North America	
Nintendo Direct	Nintendo Switch and Nintendo 3DS games	September 13, 2018 (Note: Originally scheduled for September 6, 2018, but was delayed due to the 2018 Hokkaido Eastern Iburi earthquake.)	Japan, North America, Europe, Australia	
Super Smash Bros. Ultimate Direct	Super Smash Bros. Ultimate	November 1, 2018	Japan, North America, Europe, Australia, South Korea, Hong Kong, Taiwan	
Indie World	Indie games for the Nintendo Switch	December 27, 2018	Japan	

=== 2019 ===
Broadcast type	Coverage	Date	Regions	Ref.
Indie Highlights	Indie games for the Nintendo Switch	January 23, 2019	Europe	
Nintendo Direct	Nintendo Switch games, with a focus on Fire Emblem: Three Houses	February 13, 2019	Japan, North America, Europe, Australia	
Pokémon Direct	Pokémon Sword and Shield	February 27, 2019	Japan, North America, Europe, Australia, South Korea, Hong Kong	
Nindies Showcase	Indie games for the Nintendo Switch	March 20, 2019	North America	
Super Smash Bros. Ultimate – New Content Approaching	Super Smash Bros. Ultimate DLC	April 16, 2019	Japan, North America, Europe, Australia, South Korea, Hong Kong, Taiwan	
Nintendo Direct	Super Mario Maker 2	May 15, 2019	Japan, North America, Europe, Australia	
Indie World	Indie games for the Nintendo Switch	May 31, 2019	Japan	
Pokémon Direct	Pokémon Sword and Shield	June 5, 2019	Japan, North America, Europe, Australia, South Korea, Hong Kong	
Nintendo Direct: E3 2019	Nintendo Switch games	June 11, 2019	Japan, North America, Europe, Australia, South Korea, Hong Kong, Taiwan	
Super Smash Bros. Ultimate – Mr. Sakurai Presents "Hero"	Super Smash Bros. Ultimate DLC	July 30, 2019	Japan, North America, Europe, Australia, South Korea, Hong Kong, Taiwan	
Indie World	Indie games for the Nintendo Switch	August 19, 2019	North America, Europe	
Nintendo Direct	Nintendo Switch games, with a focus on Luigi's Mansion 3 and Pokémon Sword and Shield	September 4, 2019	Japan, North America, Europe, Australia	
Super Smash Bros. Ultimate – Mr. Sakurai Presents "Banjo & Kazooie"	Super Smash Bros. Ultimate DLC	September 4, 2019	Japan, North America, Europe, Australia, South Korea, Hong Kong, Taiwan	
Super Smash Bros. Ultimate – Mr. Sakurai Presents "Terry Bogard"	Super Smash Bros. Ultimate DLC	November 6, 2019	Japan, North America, Europe, Australia, South Korea, Hong Kong, Taiwan	
Indie World	Indie games for the Nintendo Switch	December 10, 2019	Japan, North America, Europe, Australia	

=== 2020 ===
Broadcast type	Coverage	Date	Regions	Ref.
Pokémon Direct	Pokémon Mystery Dungeon: Rescue Team DX; Pokémon Sword and Shield DLC Expansion Pass; Pokémon Home	January 9, 2020	Japan, North America, Europe, Australia, South Korea, Hong Kong	
Super Smash Bros. Ultimate – Mr. Sakurai Presents "Byleth"	Super Smash Bros. Ultimate DLC	January 16, 2020	Japan, North America, Europe, Australia, South Korea, Hong Kong, Taiwan	
Nintendo Direct	Animal Crossing: New Horizons	February 20, 2020	Japan, North America, Europe, Australia	
Indie World	Indie games for the Nintendo Switch	March 17, 2020	North America, Europe, Australia	
Nintendo Direct Mini	Nintendo Switch games releasing in 2020	March 26, 2020	Japan, North America, Europe, Australia	
Pokémon Presents	Pokémon Café Mix; New Pokémon Snap; Pokémon Sword and Shield DLC Expansion Pass – Part 1: The Isle of Armor; Pokémon Sleep	June 17, 2020	Japan, North America, Europe, Australia, South Korea, Hong Kong, Taiwan	
Super Smash Bros. Ultimate – Mr. Sakurai Presents "Min Min"	Super Smash Bros. Ultimate DLC	June 22, 2020	Japan, North America, Europe, Australia, South Korea, Hong Kong, Taiwan	
Pokémon Presents	Pokémon Unite	June 24, 2020	Japan, North America, Europe, Australia, South Korea, Hong Kong, Taiwan	
Nintendo Direct Mini: Partner Showcase	Nintendo Switch games from Nintendo's developing & publishing partners	July 20, 2020	Japan, North America, Europe, Australia	
Indie World	Indie games for the Nintendo Switch	August 18, 2020	North America, Europe, Australia	
Nintendo Direct	Chinese release of Ring Fit Adventure	August 19, 2020	China	
Nintendo Direct Mini: Partner Showcase	Nintendo Switch games from Nintendo's developing & publishing partners	August 26, 2020	Japan, North America, Europe, Australia	
Nintendo Direct	Super Mario Bros. 35th Anniversary	September 3, 2020	Japan, North America, Europe, Australia	
Nintendo Direct Mini: Partner Showcase	Nintendo Switch games from Nintendo's developing & publishing partners	September 17, 2020	Japan, North America, Europe, Australia	
Nintendo Direct	Monster Hunter Rise; Monster Hunter Stories 2: Wings of Ruin	September 17, 2020	Japan, North America, Europe, Australia, South Korea, Hong Kong, Taiwan	
Super Smash Bros. Ultimate – Mr. Sakurai Presents "Steve & Alex"	Super Smash Bros. Ultimate DLC	October 3, 2020	Japan, North America, Europe, Australia, South Korea, Hong Kong, Taiwan	
Nintendo Direct Mini: Partner Showcase	Nintendo Switch games from Nintendo's developing & publishing partners	October 28, 2020	Japan, North America, Europe, Australia	
Indie World	Indie games for the Nintendo Switch	December 15, 2020	Japan, North America, Europe, Australia	
Super Smash Bros. Ultimate – Mr. Sakurai Presents "Sephiroth"	Super Smash Bros. Ultimate DLC	December 17, 2020	Japan, North America, Europe, Australia, South Korea, Hong Kong, Taiwan	
Super Nintendo World Direct	Super Nintendo World	December 18, 2020	Japan, North America, Europe, Australia, South Korea, Hong Kong, Taiwan	

=== 2021 ===
Broadcast type	Coverage	Date	Regions	Ref.
Nintendo Direct	Super Smash Bros. Ultimate DLC and Nintendo Switch games releasing in the first half of 2021	February 17, 2021	Japan, North America, Europe, Australia	
Pokémon Presents	Updates on apps and video games from the Pokémon series for its 25th Anniversary	February 26, 2021	Japan, North America, Europe, Australia, South Korea, Hong Kong, Taiwan	
Super Smash Bros. Ultimate – Mr. Sakurai Presents "Pyra/Mythra"	Super Smash Bros. Ultimate DLC	March 4, 2021	Japan, North America, Europe, Australia, South Korea, Hong Kong, Taiwan	
Indie World	Indie games for the Nintendo Switch	April 14, 2021	Japan, North America, Europe, Australia	
Nintendo Direct: E3 2021	Nintendo Switch games	June 15, 2021	Japan, North America, Europe, Australia, South Korea, Hong Kong, Taiwan	
Super Smash Bros. Ultimate – Mr. Sakurai Presents "Kazuya"	Super Smash Bros. Ultimate DLC	June 28, 2021	Japan, North America, Europe, Australia, South Korea, Hong Kong, Taiwan	
Indie World	Indie games for the Nintendo Switch	August 11, 2021	North America, Europe, Australia	
Pokémon Presents	Updates on apps and video games from the Pokémon series	August 18, 2021	Japan, North America, Europe, Australia, South Korea, Hong Kong, Taiwan	
Nintendo Direct	Nintendo Switch games	September 23, 2021	Japan, North America, Europe, Australia	
Super Smash Bros. Ultimate – Battling with Sora	Super Smash Bros. Ultimate DLC	October 5, 2021	Japan, North America, Europe, Australia, South Korea, Hong Kong, Taiwan	
Nintendo Direct	Animal Crossing: New Horizons	October 15, 2021	Japan, North America, Europe, Australia	
Indie World	Indie games for the Nintendo Switch	December 15, 2021	North America, Europe, Australia	

=== 2022 ===
Broadcast type	Coverage	Date	Regions	Ref.
Nintendo Direct	Nintendo Switch games releasing in the first half of 2022	February 9, 2022	Japan, North America, Europe, Australia	
Pokémon Presents	Updates on apps and video games from the Pokémon series	February 27, 2022	Japan, North America, Europe, Australia	
Indie World	Indie games for the Nintendo Switch	May 11, 2022	North America, Europe, Australia	
Nintendo Direct	Xenoblade Chronicles 3	June 22, 2022	Japan, North America, Europe	
Nintendo Direct Mini: Partner Showcase	Nintendo Switch games from Nintendo's developing & publishing partners	June 28, 2022	Japan, North America, Europe, Australia	
Pokémon Presents	Updates on apps and video games from the Pokémon series	August 3, 2022	Japan, North America, Europe, Australia	
Nintendo Direct	Splatoon 3	August 10, 2022	Japan, North America, Europe, Australia	
Nintendo Direct	Nintendo Switch games	September 13, 2022	Japan, North America, Europe, (Note: Out of respect for Elizabeth II following her death five days before the Nintendo Direct—especially since Tears of the Kingdom's name was revealed—the broadcast was not livestreamed on the Nintendo UK YouTube channel, but was published as a video on demand on the channel after the livestream concluded.) Australia	
The Super Mario Bros. Movie Direct	World premiere of the teaser trailer for The Super Mario Bros. Movie	October 6, 2022	Japan, North America, Europe, Australia	
Indie World	Indie games for the Nintendo Switch	November 9, 2022	Japan, North America, Europe, Australia	
The Super Mario Bros. Movie Direct	World premiere of the second trailer for The Super Mario Bros. Movie	November 29, 2022	Japan, North America, Europe, Australia	

=== 2023 ===
Broadcast type	Coverage	Date	Regions	Ref.
Nintendo Direct	Nintendo Switch games releasing in the first half of 2023	February 8, 2023	Japan, North America, Europe, Australia	
Pokémon Presents	Updates on apps and video games from the Pokémon series	February 27, 2023	Japan, North America, Europe, Australia	
The Super Mario Bros. Movie Direct	World premiere of the final trailer for The Super Mario Bros. Movie	March 9, 2023	Japan, North America, Europe, Australia	
Indie World	Indie games for the Nintendo Switch	April 19, 2023	North America, Europe, Australia	
Indie World	Indie games for the Nintendo Switch	April 20, 2023	Japan	
Nintendo Direct	Nintendo Switch games releasing in the second half of 2023, with a focus on Pikmin 4	June 21, 2023	Japan, North America, Europe, Australia	
Pokémon Presents	Updates on apps and video games from the Pokémon series	August 8, 2023	Japan, North America, Europe, Australia	
Nintendo Direct	Super Mario Bros. Wonder	August 31, 2023	Japan, North America, Europe, Australia	
Nintendo Direct	Nintendo Switch games releasing in Winter 2023	September 14, 2023	Japan, North America, Europe, Australia	
Indie World	Indie games for the Nintendo Switch	November 14, 2023	Japan, North America, Europe, Australia	

=== 2024 ===
Broadcast type	Coverage	Date	Regions	Ref.
Nintendo Direct: Partner Showcase	Nintendo Switch games from Nintendo's developing & publishing partners in early 2024	February 21, 2024	Japan, North America, Europe, Australia	
Pokémon Presents	Updates on apps and video games from the Pokémon series	February 27, 2024	Japan, North America, Europe, Australia	
Indie World	Indie games for the Nintendo Switch	April 17, 2024	Japan, North America, Europe, Australia	
Nintendo Direct	Nintendo Switch games releasing in the second half of 2024	June 18, 2024	Japan, North America, Europe, Australia	
Nintendo Museum Direct	Nintendo Museum	August 19, 2024	Japan, North America, Europe, Australia	
Indie World	Indie games for the Nintendo Switch	August 27, 2024	Japan, North America, Europe, Australia	
Nintendo Direct: Partner Showcase	Nintendo Switch games from Nintendo's developing & publishing partners — aired immediately after Indie World showcase	August 27, 2024	Japan, North America, Europe, Australia	
Super Nintendo World Direct	Donkey Kong Country (Super Nintendo World addition)	November 11, 2024	Japan, North America, Europe, Australia, South Korea, Hong Kong, Taiwan	

=== 2025 ===
Broadcast type	Coverage	Date	Regions	Ref.
Pokémon Presents	Updates on apps and video games from the Pokémon series	February 27, 2025	Japan, North America, Europe, Australia	
Nintendo Direct	Nintendo Switch games	March 27, 2025	Japan, North America, Europe, Australia	
Nintendo Direct: Nintendo Switch 2	Nintendo Switch 2 hardware and games	April 2, 2025	Japan, North America, Europe, Australia	
Nintendo Direct	Mario Kart World	April 17, 2025	Japan, North America, Europe, Australia	
Nintendo Direct	Donkey Kong Bananza	June 18, 2025	Japan, North America, Europe, Australia	
Pokémon Presents	Updates on apps and video games from the Pokémon series	July 22, 2025	Japan, North America, Europe, Australia	
Nintendo Direct: Partner Showcase	Nintendo Switch 2 and Nintendo Switch games from Nintendo's publishing partners	July 31, 2025	Japan, North America, Europe, Australia	
Indie World	Indie games for the Nintendo Switch 2 and Nintendo Switch	August 7, 2025	Japan, North America, Europe, Australia	
Nintendo Direct	Kirby Air Riders	August 19, 2025	Japan, North America, Europe, Australia	
Nintendo Direct	Nintendo Switch 2 and Nintendo Switch games, with a focus on the Super Mario Bros. 40th Anniversary	September 12, 2025	Japan, North America, Europe, Australia	
Nintendo Direct	Kirby Air Riders	October 23, 2025	Japan, North America, Europe, Australia	
The Super Mario Galaxy Movie Direct	World premiere of the first trailer for The Super Mario Galaxy Movie	November 12, 2025	Japan, North America, Europe, Australia	

=== 2026 ===
Broadcast type	Coverage	Date	Regions	Ref.
The Super Mario Galaxy Movie Direct	World premiere of the second trailer for The Super Mario Galaxy Movie	January 25, 2026	Japan, North America, Europe, Australia	
Nintendo Direct	Tomodachi Life: Living the Dream	January 29, 2026	Japan, North America, Europe, Australia	
Nintendo Direct: Partner Showcase	Nintendo Switch 2 and Nintendo Switch games from Nintendo's publishing partners	February 5, 2026	Japan, North America, Europe, Australia	
Pokémon Presents	Updates on apps and video games from the Pokémon series	February 27, 2026	Japan, North America, Europe, Australia	
Indie World	Indie games for the Nintendo Switch 2 and Nintendo Switch	March 3, 2026	Japan, North America, Europe, Australia	
The Super Mario Galaxy Movie Direct	World premiere of the final trailer for The Super Mario Galaxy Movie	March 9, 2026	Japan, North America, Europe, Australia	
Nintendo Direct	Star Fox	May 6, 2026	Japan, North America, Europe, Australia	
Nintendo Direct	Nintendo Switch 2 and Nintendo Switch games	June 9, 2026	Japan, North America, Europe, Australia	
Nintendo Direct	Splatoon Raiders	June 30, 2026	Japan, North America, Europe, Australia	
Nintendo Direct	Fire Emblem: Fortune's Weave	August 4, 2026	Japan, North America, Europe, Australia	
Nintendo Direct	The Legend of Zelda 40th anniversary	September 8, 2026	Japan, North America, Europe, Australia	
Nintendo Direct	Nintendo Switch 2 games	September 9, 2026	Japan, North America, Europe, Australia	
Indie World	Indie games for the Nintendo Switch 2 and Nintendo Switch	October 28, 2026	Japan, North America, Europe, Australia	
Nintendo Direct	Pikmin Day	October 31, 2026	Japan, North America, Europe, Australia	

== See also ==
- List of Iwata Asks interviews
- State of Play (video program)
- Xbox Developer Direct
