= Doug Bowser =

American businessman

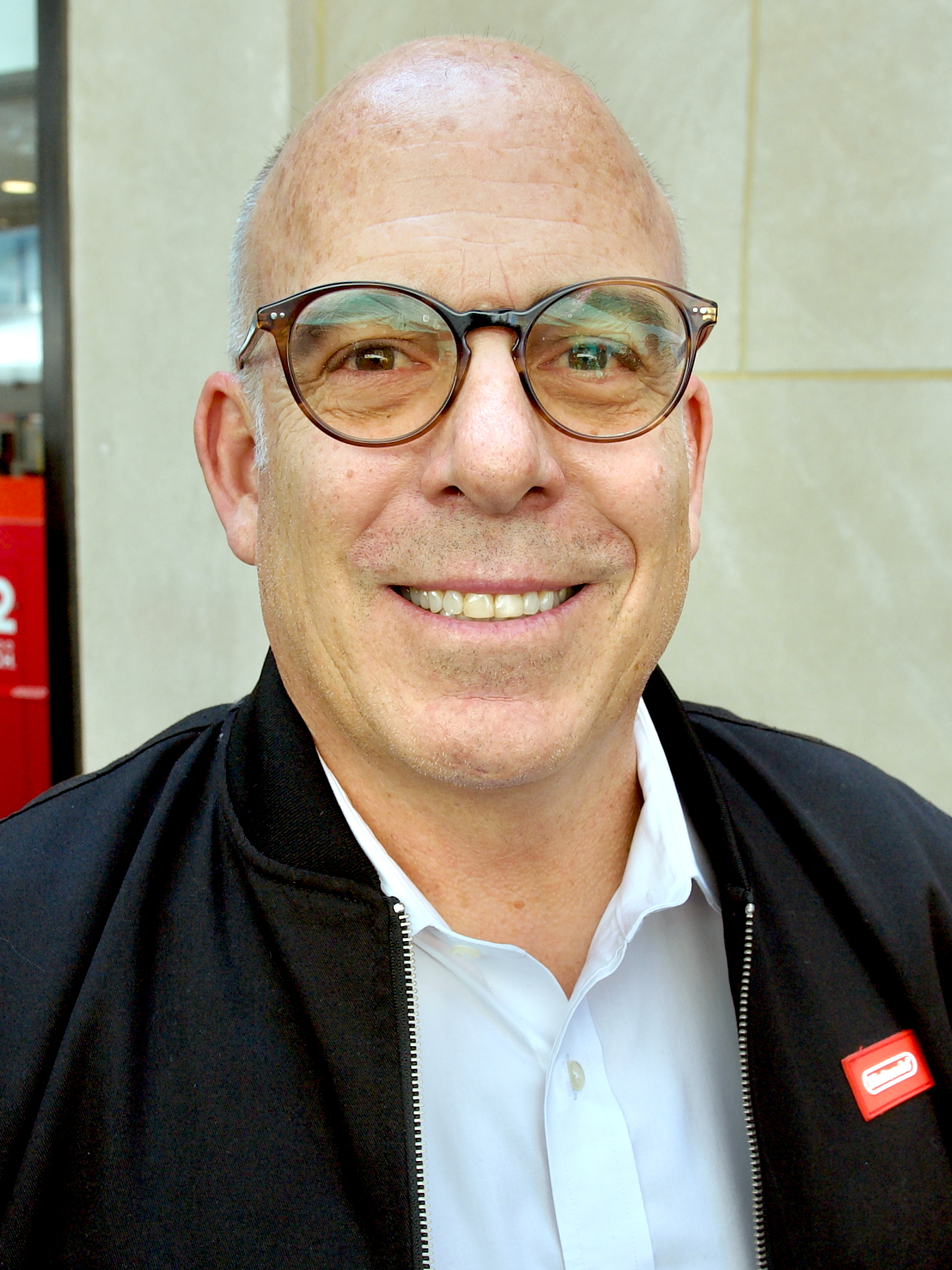
- Bowser in 2025

4th President of Nintendo of America
- In office April 15, 2019 – December 31, 2025
- Preceded by: Reggie Fils-Aimé
- Succeeded by: Devon Pritchard

Personal details
- Born: Doug Spencer Bowser New York, U.S.
- Education: University of Utah (BA)
- Employer: Procter & Gamble (1984–2007); Electronic Arts (2007–2015); Nintendo (2015–2025); Hasbro (2026–present)

Doug Spencer Bowser is an American businessman who served as the president and chief operating officer of Nintendo of America, the North American branch of the Japanese video game company Nintendo, from 2019 to 2025.

== Early career ==
Doug Spencer Bowser was born in Upstate New York. Bowser graduated from the University of Utah with a bachelor’s degree in communications in 1984, going on to work at Procter & Gamble from 1984 to 2007, which included serving as the director of customer marketing for the Latin American region from 1998 to 2004, and the company's Safeway customer team from 2004 to 2007. Bowser worked at Electronic Arts from 2007 through 2015, serving as vice president of global demand planning.

== Nintendo ==
Bowser joined Nintendo of America in 2015 as the vice president of sales and marketing, advancing to senior vice president in mid-2016. In this role, he managed North American sales strategy and retail launch for the Nintendo Switch. His division also oversaw regional distribution for late-lifecycle Nintendo 3DS systems.

In February 2019, Nintendo of America's president and chief operating officer Reggie Fils-Aimé announced his retirement, and Bowser was named as his successor as the company's president in April 2019. In addition to these duties, Bowser represents Nintendo for the Entertainment Software Association.

Bowser coincidentally shares his surname with the main antagonist of the Mario franchise, Bowser. This drew interest when he was first hired by Nintendo, and was the subject of further humorous reactions online upon his promotion to president. The BBC referred to the case as "one of the most charming cases of nominative determinism ever". Nintendo jokingly referenced the name similarity during their E3 2019 Nintendo Direct presentation. Bowser said he had no issues when such jokes are made, stating "It's a signal to me that we have an amazing, passionate following, and our fans are embracing it. It's ironic that we share the same name, and there are times when it'll be fun and we'll play with it, but we're two very, very different characters. I'm not tired of it at all though."

After becoming president in April of 2019, Bowser oversaw the release of the Nintendo Switch Lite, and Nintendo Switch OLED model. While also continuing to support the Nintendo Switch and the New Nintendo 2DS XL (which ceased manufacturing in September of 2020). Bowser regularly served as a media spokesperson promoting major software releases, such as Luigi's Mansion 3.. Bowser was also president of Nintendo during the global COVID-19 pandemic and saw Animal Crossing: New Horizons blow past corporate expectations, which lead to supply chain issues.

Bowser stepped down as president of Nintendo of America on December 31, 2025, and was succeeded by executive vice president of revenue, marketing and consumer experience and NOA leadership team member Devon Pritchard.

== Post-Nintendo ==
In January 20, 2026, Bowser joined Hasbro as part of its board of directors.

Business positions
Preceded by Reggie Fils-Aimé	President of Nintendo of America; 2019 – 2025	Succeeded by Devon Pritchard
