= Reggie Fils-Aimé =

American businessman (born 1961)

- Fils-Aimé in 2011

3rd President of Nintendo of America
- In office May 25, 2006 – April 15, 2019
- Preceded by: Tatsumi Kimishima
- Succeeded by: Doug Bowser

Personal details
- Born: Reginald Fils-Aimé; March 25, 1961 (age 65) New York City, U.S.
- Spouse: Stacey Sanner
- Children: 3
- Education: Cornell University (BS)

Reginald Fils-Aimé (/ˈfiːsəmeɪ/ FEE-sə-may; born March 25, 1961) is an American businessman best known for being the president and chief operating officer of Nintendo of America, the North American branch of the Japanese video game company Nintendo, from 2006 to 2019. Prior to his promotion to president and COO, Fils-Aimé was executive vice president of sales and marketing.

Fils-Aimé gained celebrity status among gamers following his appearance at Nintendo's E3 2004 press conference in May 2004, and helped to revitalize Nintendo's image as a major contender among the other video game console makers, Sony Interactive Entertainment and Microsoft. Fils-Aimé had held previous sales and marketing executive roles at Procter & Gamble, Pizza Hut, Guinness, Derby Cycle, Panda Express, and VH1.

Fils-Aimé retired as president of Nintendo of America on April 15, 2019, after an announcement on February 21, and was succeeded by Doug Bowser. He subsequently became a Leader in Residence at Cornell University and was later named to the board of directors for Brunswick Corporation, GameStop, and Spin Master.

== Early life ==
Reginald Fils-Aimé was born on March 25, 1961, in The Bronx, New York City. His parents had immigrated to the United States from Haiti in the 1950s due to conflicting political views of his grandparents; his paternal grandfather was a general when the Haitian military overthrew the democratically elected government, which included his maternal grandfather. Fils-Aimé's mother worked as a lead sales representative in a fine jewelry store and his father was a machinist. Fils-Aimé has said that he adopted his optimistic attitude from his mother. He was raised on Long Island, where he attended Brentwood High School; he described himself as the "lone minority" among his classmates. He was accepted into Cornell University in 1979, and graduated with a Bachelor of Science in applied economics and management from the College of Agriculture and Life Sciences in 1983. He was president of the school's Phi Sigma Kappa fraternity chapter, where he was described as being neat and organized.

== Career ==
Fils-Aimé took a job at Procter & Gamble in the company's brand management program. He also took a position as senior director of national marketing at Pizza Hut, where he launched the Bigfoot Pizza and the Big New Yorker.

Fils-Aimé served as the Head of Marketing for Guinness Imports Co. in the United States and was responsible for all brands. He also worked as chief marketing officer at Derby Cycle, directing sales and marketing efforts worldwide for eight brands. Fils-Aimé served as managing director and oversaw Raleigh U.K., Derby's British operations.

He then joined the American Chinese food company Panda Management Co. acting as senior vice-president. He also joined MTV's VH1 network in 2001 as senior vice-president and left in 2003. Fils-Aimé was responsible for a 30% increase in ratings for the VH1 network by shifting the channel's focus to appeal to younger viewers. As part of his role at VH1, Fils-Aimé also laid out and implemented a marketing strategy for The Concert for New York City, which garnered more than $35 million for disaster relief following the September 11 attacks.

=== Nintendo ===
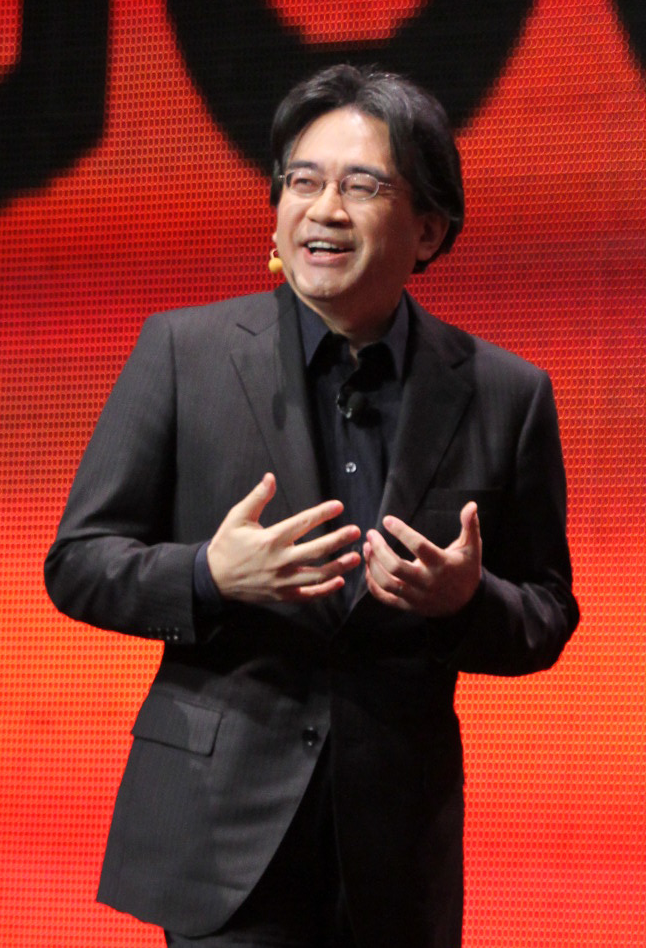
Fils-Aimé considered president Satoru Iwata (pictured in 2011) his mentor and a friend during his time at Nintendo.

Fils-Aimé joined Nintendo in December 2003 as the executive vice president of sales and marketing. Fils-Aimé had been recruited for the position, but during the interview period, he said that he had asked to see Satoru Iwata, the president of Nintendo, which was considered highly unusual but was granted. His conversation with Iwata went far longer than planned and it helped to establish the friendly relationship Fils-Aimé had with Iwata for more than a decade which, according to Fils-Aimé, helped with open communications and understanding to help Nintendo improve overall as a business. Because of this, Fils-Aimé has called Iwata his mentor as well as a "dear friend" throughout his time at Nintendo.

Fils-Aimé was initially responsible for all sales and marketing activities for Nintendo in the United States, Canada, and Latin America. On May 25, 2006, Fils-Aimé became the president and chief operating officer of Nintendo of America after former president, Tatsumi Kimishima, was moved to his new role as chairman of the board and chief executive officer. Fils-Aimé was the first American to hold this position.

At the time Fils-Aimé was hired in 2003, the video game industry was stagnant in major markets, and Nintendo's competitors Microsoft and Sony Computer Entertainment were looking to regain interest by building more powerful home consoles. For Nintendo, it had recently come off re-organization of upper management, including Iwata being named its president only the year prior. The company was producing the GameCube, but Iwata and other Nintendo executives saw that most titles being produced were sequels with almost no new intellectual property. Fils-Aimé said that the decision for Nintendo to differ from its competitors and try to bring back fun into video games was made before he had been hired, and part of that was planned through Fils-Aimé's marketing skills and presence.

Fils-Aimé became a recognized public face for Nintendo at the 2004 E3. The year prior, Nintendo's press conference was considered a quiet and dry affair compared to the conferences given by Microsoft and Sony Computer Entertainment; while Iwata and other Japanese executives were present, the only American on stage was George S. Harrison and had remained stoic during the conference. Nintendo was also losing in the sixth console generation. The GameCube was struggling against the PlayStation 2 and the original Xbox console, and long-time Nintendo fans were despondent over Nintendo's current state. Fils-Aimé served to lead off the 2004 conference as his first introduction to the public. He led off the conference with "My name is Reggie. I'm about kickin' ass, I'm about takin' names, and we're about makin' games." His presentation was considered aggressive, and at one point directly attacked the approaches that Microsoft and Sony were taking with handling of video game content on their consoles. This message had been thoroughly planned by the upper management of Nintendo and Fils-Aimé had expressed caution to them about the tone of the message, but they still wanted him to deliver it. His theatrical antics, flying in the face of Nintendo's long-standing conservative image, gained a cult following soon after, with many gamers calling him the "Regginator", a play on the character of the Terminator.

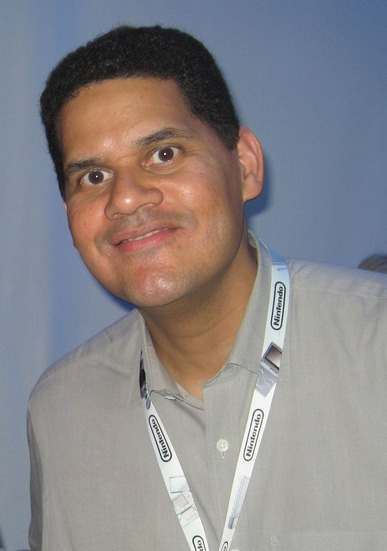
Fils-Aimé during E3 2006

Following the conference, many images of him spread across the Web. In interviews years after the 2004 event, Fils-Aimé said that his presentation was not his idea, but writing from the public relations department, and he himself had to be convinced to give the aggressive approach. Fils-Aimé's presentation was considered by others the right attitude that Nintendo needed to present at the time to show themselves still relevant in the current console generation and was no longer taking a conservative approach to gaming.

Fils-Aimé is considered to be responsible for revamping Nintendo's public relations in North America, leading many fans and members of the press to dub his arrival the "Reggielution" (after "Revolution", the code name for the Wii). He had not only considered the constantly-changing challenges of marketing to youth, but as well as continuing to address the older video game players, who were still a key market for Nintendo. He further believed that addressing all demographics would be like a rising tide for the industry with Nintendo positioned to capture that the best. While still in sales, Fils-Aimé rewrote how Nintendo worked with vendors; instead of having Nintendo try to seek vendors' favor and better in-store place by assuring Nintendo could meet demand, Fils-Aimé created agreements where vendors would only get Nintendo's stock in stores if vendors ordered high volumes of their product. This served to help with the success and popularity of the Nintendo DS. He has attributed the success of the Wii to a marketing strategy laid out by Clayton Christensen:

First, how do you satisfy the core while still expanding appeal? And second, how do you leverage your strengths against entirely untapped audiences—to the so-called "blue oceans" in popular marketing speak? ... Provide a new product that actually underperforms on an established industry metric for "progress", and substitute an alternative that typically is smaller, less expensive and easier to use. Initially, the "core" of any industry will scoff. But if the product is right, enough new users will be attracted to form an alternative definition for progress.

Fils-Aimé speaking at E3 2009

On July 11, 2007, while introducing the Wii Balance Board, Fils-Aimé walked up onto the stage and stated "My body is ready." This quotation would eventually become a meme and Fils-Aimé acknowledged the phrase several times, including at the E3 2012 conference, his appearance on Late Night with Jimmy Fallon and his resignation announcement video. When Iwata implemented their Nintendo Direct online press conferences, Fils-Aimé would frequently participate in these alongside Iwata, including a mock Mii-avatar battle, which similarly became the subject of several memes. In other public press presentations for Nintendo, Fils-Aimé has been involved with skits with production support from Stoopid Buddy Stoodios, Mega64, and The Jim Henson Company.

On November 5, 2007, at the encouragement of marketing professor Ed McLaughlin in the department of Applied Economics and Management at Cornell University, Fils-Aimé gave a guest lecture on Nintendo's marketing strategy targeted at gamers across a spectrum of demographics. Fils-Aimé was a member of the advisory council for Cornell's Communication department from 2008 to 2021.

Fils-Aimé at the GDC 2011

Fils-Aimé announced his resignation as the company's president and COO on February 21, 2019, which took effect on April 15, 2019. He was replaced by the company's then-head of sales, Doug Bowser. Fils-Aimé stated he started thinking about retirement after Iwata's death in 2015: "It also reinforced for me the legacy that he had built, and he had created for the company. And that really drove me to be introspective around, 'So what's the legacy that I want to build, that I want to leave?'" He waited until he felt Nintendo of America was on solid footing for positive growth, which occurred by early 2019, to begin the process of retiring. His decision to retire was emboldened by the success of the Nintendo Switch, a hybrid game console the company released in 2017 which by the end of 2018 had already reached over 32 million sales. He believed with the Switch, which he had compared to Nintendo's previously successful Wii and Nintendo DS consoles, "the company was going to be in great shape for at least a few years".

=== Post-Nintendo ===
After leaving Nintendo, Fils-Aimé created his own Twitter account under the name @Reggie and made his first tweet saying, "Hi Twitter community."

Fils-Aimé announced he had been brought on as the first Leader in Residence at Cornell University's Charles H. Dyson School of Applied Economics and Management starting in October 2019. Fils-Aimé had already been on the advisory board for Dyson as well as for Cornell's department of communications prior to this appointment, and was approached by Cornell shortly after his retirement announcement about the opportunity. In addition, Fils-Aimé joined the board of directors for the New York Videogame Critics Circle, and became a managing partner in Brentwood Growth Partners, an equity firm based in Kirkland, Washington. Through his positions at Cornell and through the New York Videogame Critics Circle, he wants to provide mentorship opportunities for youth and young adults as to encourage them to grow and become "leaders across a range of as many different disciplines as possible". Through the Residence program he plans to present his "Seven Principles for Next Generation Leaders" that he had learned over his career, and will work with the New York Videogame Critics Circle to help younger students in programs like the DreamYard Academy at William Howard Taft High School to show the students "the work that's done through the power of video games, using video games as the medium to teach critical thinking, to teach writing skills". Fils-Aimé stated these also help him give back to both the community he was raised in and to his alma mater.

Fils-Aimé (right) at the Game Awards 2018, with Sony's Shawn Layden and Microsoft's Phil Spencer

Fils-Aimé, who had participated in the Game Awards since its creation in 2015, presented at the Game Awards 2019. GameStop named Fils-Aimé along two others onto its board of directors in March 2020, replacing several directors that were leaving as part of the company's efforts to turn the company's profitability around. He and several of GameStop's board members were slated to resign around June 2021 based on SEC filings. He was also named to Spin Master's board of directors in May 2020.

After the COVID-19 pandemic began, Fils-Aimé announced that he and video games journalist Harold Goldberg would start a podcast, Talking Games with Reggie and Harold, in conjunction with the New York Video Game Critics Circle. The podcast is aimed to raise charitable funds for the non-profit group to help mentor lower-income and under-served students in New York City impacted by the pandemic. Fils-Aimé was added to the board of directors at Brunswick Corporation on October 27, 2020, and later authored a book titled Disrupting the Game: From the Bronx to the Top of Nintendo released in April 2022.

== Accolades ==
Fils-Aimé in 2009

Fils-Aimé has been recognized for his marketing expertise in the advertising industry, including receiving a Clio Award, two Gold Effie Awards, an Association of Independent Commercial Producers Award for advertising excellence, a Silver Edison from the American Marketing Institute, and was named one of the "Marketing 100" in 1998 by Advertising Age. From the video game industry, Fils-Aimé was given a Lifetime Achievement Award by the International Video Game Hall of Fame and has received the Legend Award from the New York Videogame Critics Circle.

== Personal life ==
Fils-Aimé is married to Stacey Sanner, his longtime girlfriend whom he met in his previous position at VH1. He has three children from a previous marriage. Fils-Aimé started playing video games with his children when they were two and five years old. As of 2006, he lived on the Eastside of Seattle.

== Bibliography ==
- Fils-Aimé, Reggie (2022). Disrupting the Game: From the Bronx to the Top of Nintendo. HarperCollins Leadership. ISBN 9781400226672.

Business positions
Preceded by Tatsumi Kimishima	President of Nintendo of America; 2006 – 2019	Succeeded by Doug Bowser
