= Shuntaro Furukawa =

Japanese businessman (born 1972)

- 古川俊太郎

6th President of Nintendo
- Incumbent
- Assumed office June 28, 2018
- Fellow: Shigeru Miyamoto
- Preceded by: Tatsumi Kimishima

Personal details
- Born: January 10, 1972 (age 54) Tokyo, Japan
- Education: Waseda University

Shuntaro Furukawa (古川 俊太郎, Furukawa Shuntarō; born January 10, 1972) is a Japanese executive who currently serves as the president of the video game company Nintendo. He succeeded Tatsumi Kimishima as the company's sixth president in June 2018.

== Early life ==
Furukawa was born in Tokyo, Japan, on January 10, 1972. He grew up playing games on Nintendo's Famicom console, mainly third party games such as Nobunaga's Ambition and baseball games like Super Batter Up, not Nintendo games, until he was recommended by another student to play Super Mario Kart, making it the reason he became interested in joining. Furukawa is a graduate of Kunitachi Senior High School, and graduated from Waseda University with a degree in Political Science and Economics in 1994. Furukawa is fluent in English.

== Career ==
In April 1994, he joined Nintendo and worked as an accountant at the European headquarters for a decade. In May 2012 he became an outside director in the board of directors of the partly owned The Pokémon Company as the Nintendo representative, due to the company owning 32% shares in the joint venture, until 2018 when Satoru Shibata succeed him in the position.

In July 2015, he was promoted to senior director, corporate planning department. In June 2016, with some company restructuring he joined the Nintendo Board of Directors and as the Managing Executive Officer of the Corporate Analysis & Administration Division. In September 2016 he also became in charge of Global Marketing Department prior to the launch of the new console, which he was involved in the marketing, development and release of the Nintendo Switch.

On June 28, 2018, Furukawa was sworn in as the sixth president of Nintendo, succeeding Tatsumi Kimishima.
