= Satoru Shibata =

Senior executive officer at Nintendo (born 1962)

- Born: September 4, 1962 (age 64); Japan
- Employer: Nintendo (1985-present)
- Title: Managing Director of Nintendo Australia (1999-2000); President of Nintendo of Europe (2000-2018); Executive Officer at Nintendo (2016-2018); Outside director of The Pokémon Company (2018-present); Senior Executive Officer (2018-2022); Executive General Manager of Marketing Division and Licensing Division (2018-present); Managing Executive Officer (2022-present); Senior General Manager, Asia & Oceania Business Division (2023-2025); CEO at Nintendo of America (2025-present)

Satoru Shibata (柴田 聡, Shibata Satoru) is the managing executive officer and corporate director at the board of directors, executive general manager for the marketing division, senior general manager for publisher & developer relations division at Nintendo and the chief executive officer (CEO) at Nintendo of America, as well as the outside director of The Pokémon Company, representing Nintendo's side at the joint venture.

He was named president of Nintendo of Europe when Shigeru Ota left in August 2000 until 30 June 2018. Shibata was also formerly the managing director of Nintendo Australia.

== Career ==
Shibata has appeared at several presentations including the Nintendo Show, the Nintendo DS event in Paris, the Nintendo of Europe Wii event in September 2006, the European Nintendo 3DS press conference in Amsterdam in January 2011, and at Gamescom 2011. He has also promoted several games through interaction with celebrities, such as playing Wii Sports tennis with Tim Henman and Greg Rusedski, and singing "Call Me Maybe" for Carly Rae Jepsen. He has also gained attention for various other actions, including a fashion show for New Style Boutique and cosplaying as Phoenix Wright.

From 2012 to 2015, Shibata hosted the European editions of Nintendo Direct, and often appeared alongside Nintendo's former global president, Satoru Iwata. Before the first European Nintendo Direct aired, Shibata had very seldom appeared in public due to his shyness; however, he gained greater exposure following his appearances in those presentations, as well as in letters sent to Nintendo 3DS owners in Nintendo Letter Box.

In April 2018, he announced that he would be leaving his position as president of Nintendo of Europe to be part of the Nintendo board of directors in Japan and be the general manager of the Marketing Division and the Licensing Division.

In June 2022 he was appointed as Managing Executive Officer, and in July 2023 he was appointed as Executive General Manager, Marketing Division and Senior General Manager, Asia & Oceania Business Division.

In September 2025, Nintendo announced that on December 31 of that year, Shibata would become the new CEO of Nintendo of America, a position that was unfilled in the branch since the passing of Satoru Iwata. Shibata continues his time working in Japan as well.
