= Derby Cycle =

German bicycle company

Derby Cycle AG
- Founded: 1988; 38 years ago
- Defunct: 11 September 2011
- Fate: Acquired by Pon Holdings
- Headquarters: Cloppenburg, Germany
- Products: Bicycles

Derby Cycle GmbH, based in Cloppenburg, Germany, was a manufacturer of bicycles in Europe. During the 2010/11 fiscal year, Derby employed 756 people. Derby Cycle has a 14% market share in Germany. Formerly, the Derby Cycle AG was listed in the Prime Standard of the regulated market of the Frankfurt Stock Exchange. It was acquired by Pon Holdings in 2011.

== History ==
Derby Cycle Corporation has roots in Luxembourg-based Derby International Corp. SA, a company that had purchased Raleigh Bicycle Company in April 1987. The Derby Cycle Corporation was acquired by chief Alan Finden-Crofts, former chief of Dunlop Slazenger, and attorney Ed Gottesman, from Tube Investments (TI) for £18 million, plus £14 million in assumed debt.

In 1988, Derby Group acquired the "Kalkhoff" brand from the insolvent Neue Kalkhoff Werke GmbH & Co. KG., creating the German subsidiary Derby Cycle Werke GmbH ("Derby Cycle Werke"). Kalkhoff had been founded in Oldenburg in 1919. In 1992, Derby Holding (Deutschland) GmbH was established, incorporating Derby Cycle Werke and Raleigh Fahrräder GmbH.

Derby Cycle sought U.S. bankruptcy protection on August 20, 2001. The management of Derby International, now Derby Group, acquired Derby Cycle Corporation and renamed it Raleigh Cycle Ltd.

In November 2007, Kalkhoff took over the insolvent Derby Cycle Werke's Kynast works in Quakenbrück. The initial public offering followed the successful restructuring of the Frankfurt subsidiary Finatem on 4 February 2011. The Dutch Accell Group launched a failed takeover attempt in late 2011.

Pon Holdings, a Dutch trading company that owns the Gazelle, Cervélo and Union Bicycles brands, acquired Derby Cycle in 2011.

== Brands ==
The following brands and trademarks are currently under the umbrella of Derby Cycle Works:

- Kalkhoff, premium brand of comfort bikes
- Focus, (acquired 1997) a premium brand for road and mountain bikes
- Rixe, (acquired 1998) city and trekking bikes
- Univega (acquired 2001)
- Raleigh, better known as Raleigh Germany, produced in Cloppenburg for German-speaking Europe only

Divested:

- Haro Designs - acquired 1988 via West Coast Cycle along with NISHIKI and Cycle Pro.; sold Kenstone Metals 1993
- Nishiki - acquired 1989, sold U.S. rights to Dick's Sporting Goods in 2010
- Raleigh - acquired 1999, sold to Accell Group in 2012
