= Rixe =

German motorcycle manufacturer

Last Logo of Rixe

Rixe Logo

Rixe & Co. was a German bicycle, moped, and small motorcycle manufacturer with a factory in Brake, Bielefeld, Germany from 1921 to 1984.

Rixe & Co. produced 5.5 million units during that time and employed 1000 people at their peak.

Rixe Bicycles were imported to the United States by Victoria Distributors in Lancaster, PA from the mid-1950s to the mid-1960s.

In 1984, the factory was sold and shipped to China.

In 1998 the Rixe name was acquired by Derby Cycle Werke and used on a line of their bicycles.

In 2013, Derby Cycle Werkes was fully acquired by Pon Holdings. There is no mention of Rixe on Pon Holdings website or on Pon Bikes website. Derby Cycle discontinued Rixe in 2020. The Rixe website was shut down in 2021. Rixe was acquired by ZEG in 2023 but discontinued again in 2024.

== Rixe Bicycles ==
Rixe initially produced parts for other manufacturers.

In 1923 they began producing their own line of bicycles under the name Rico and continued to use the Rico name until the end of 1924.

In 1924 they trademarked the name “Rixe & Co” and produced their bicycle line under the Rixe name.

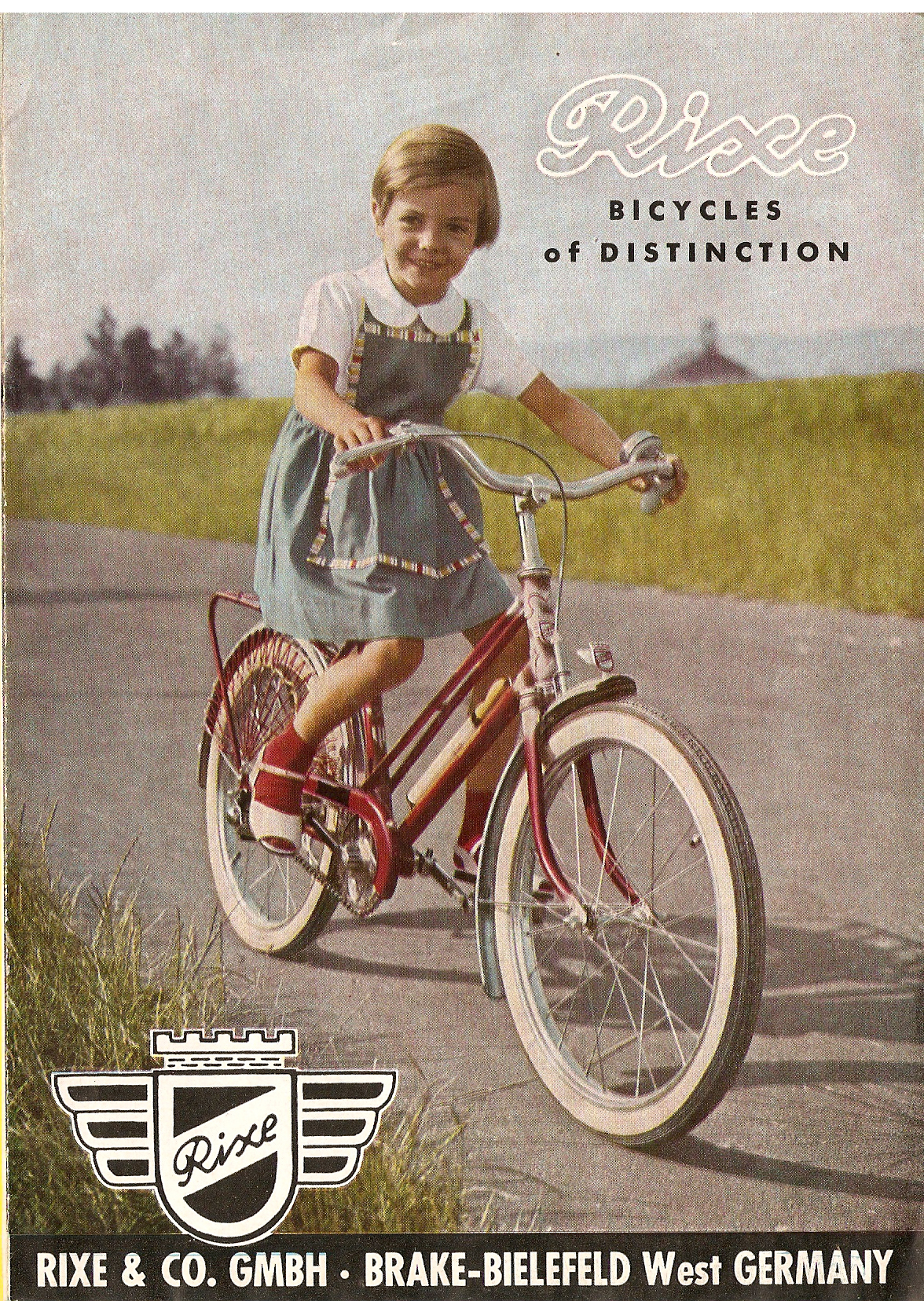
Rixe US Brochure Cover 1950s

In the 1950s through the mid-1960s, Earnest Reyersbach imported Rixe Bicycles to the United States through his company, Victoria Distributors in Lancaster, PA. West Coast Cycle Supply Company in Los Angeles, California, also distributed Rixe Bicycles they purchased through Victoria Distributors.

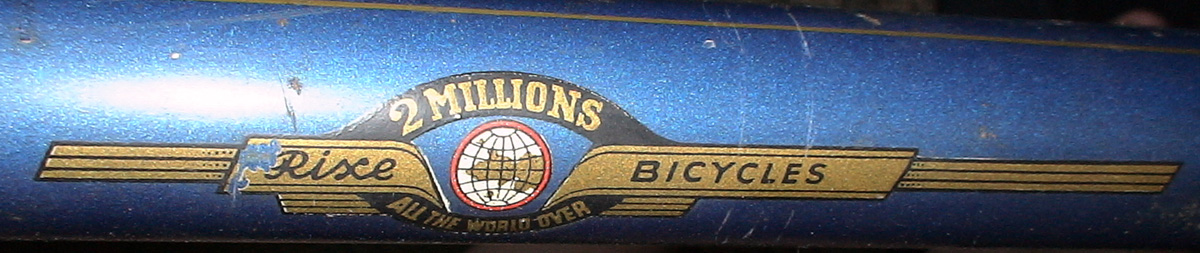
Rixe 2 Million Sold Sticker

During this time, Rixe and Co was advertising 2 million sold the world over on their bicycles and their advertising.

Also during this time, Rixe was involved in European and American bicycle racing. Ted Earnst, who later started Bicycle Super Mart-Manhattan Beach, CA, raced on Rixe bikes.

While there is no published date to when Victoria Distributors stopped importing Rixe Bicycles to the United States, there was an ad for Rixe Bikes as late as January 1964 in the American Bicyclist Magazine.

Rixe Bicycle Models

- Scooter (kid’s)
- Tots
- Capri boys or girls models in 16”, 20”, 24”, 26”
- Cuba boys or girls models in 20”, 24”, 26”
- Clipper boys or girls models in 20”, 24”, 26”
- Pony 59 men’s
- Pony 59 women’s
- Pony men’s or women’s models
- Beacon men’s or women’s models
- Victor 59 men’s or women’s models
- Club men’s or women’s models
- SR60 High spec 10 speed
- SR27 Lower spec 10 speed
- Track Racer
- Cycle Truck
- T-26 Tandem with springer/girder front fork
- T-175 Tandem without springer front fork
- Child’s tandem (not in US brochure)
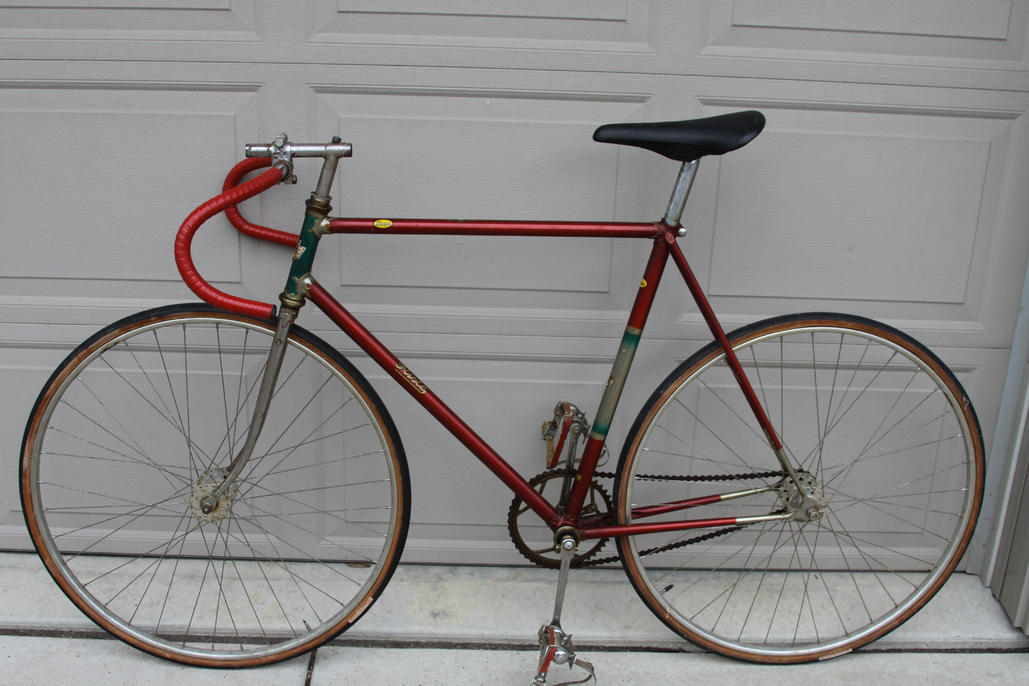
Rixe Track Racer

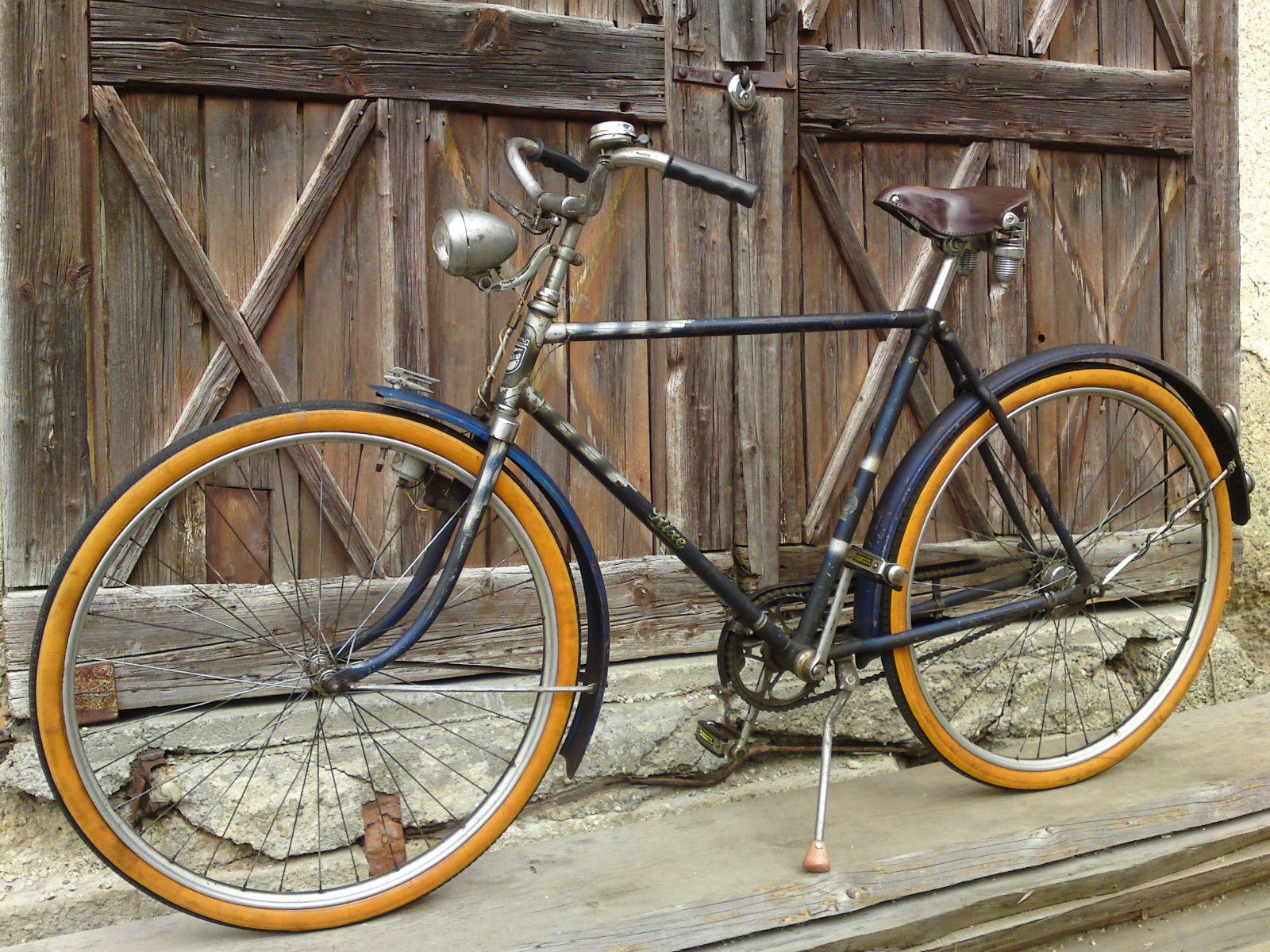
Rixe Victor

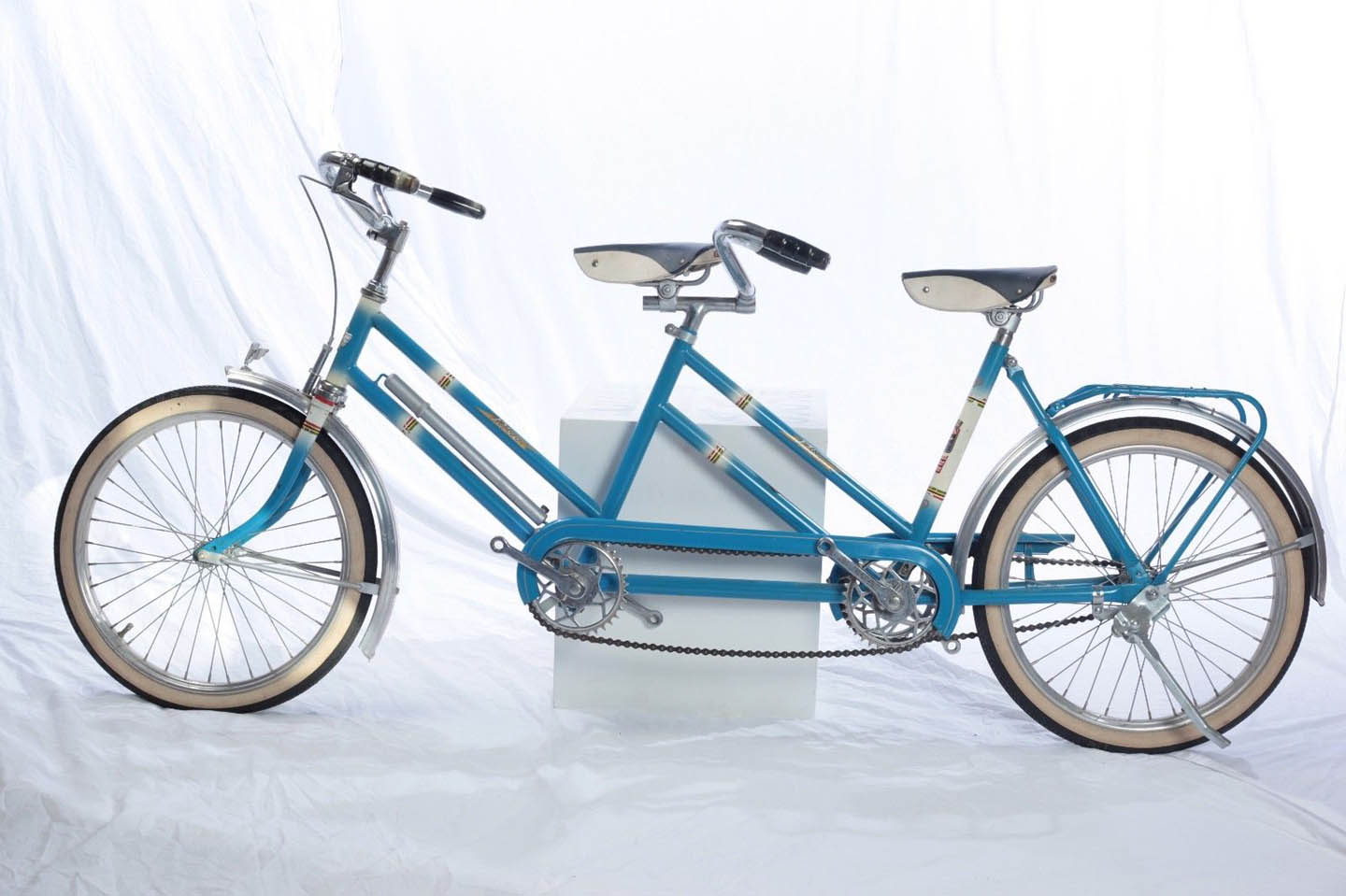
Rixe Child's Tandem

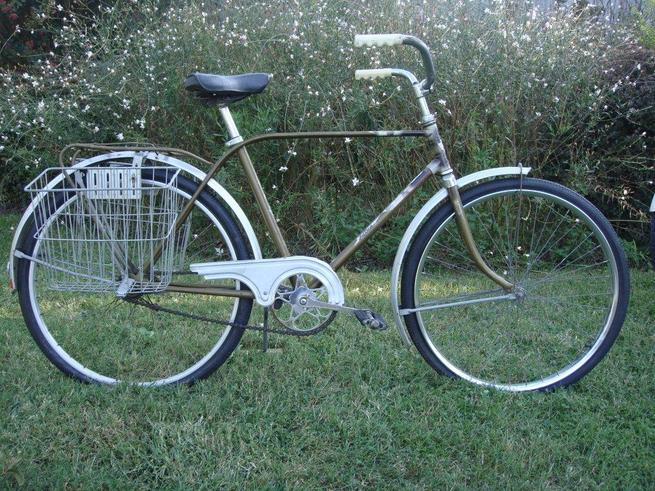
Rixe Capri 26 Men's

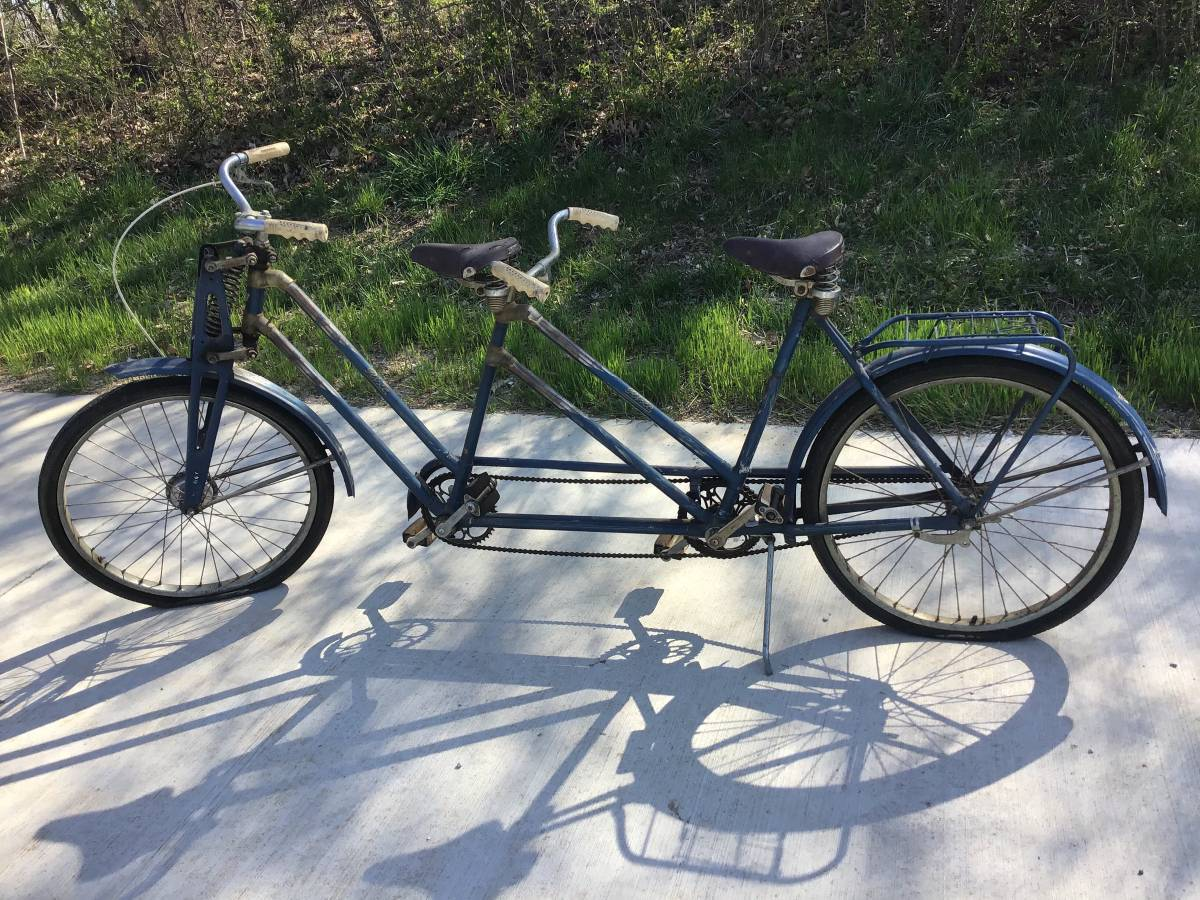
Rixe T-26 Adult Tandem

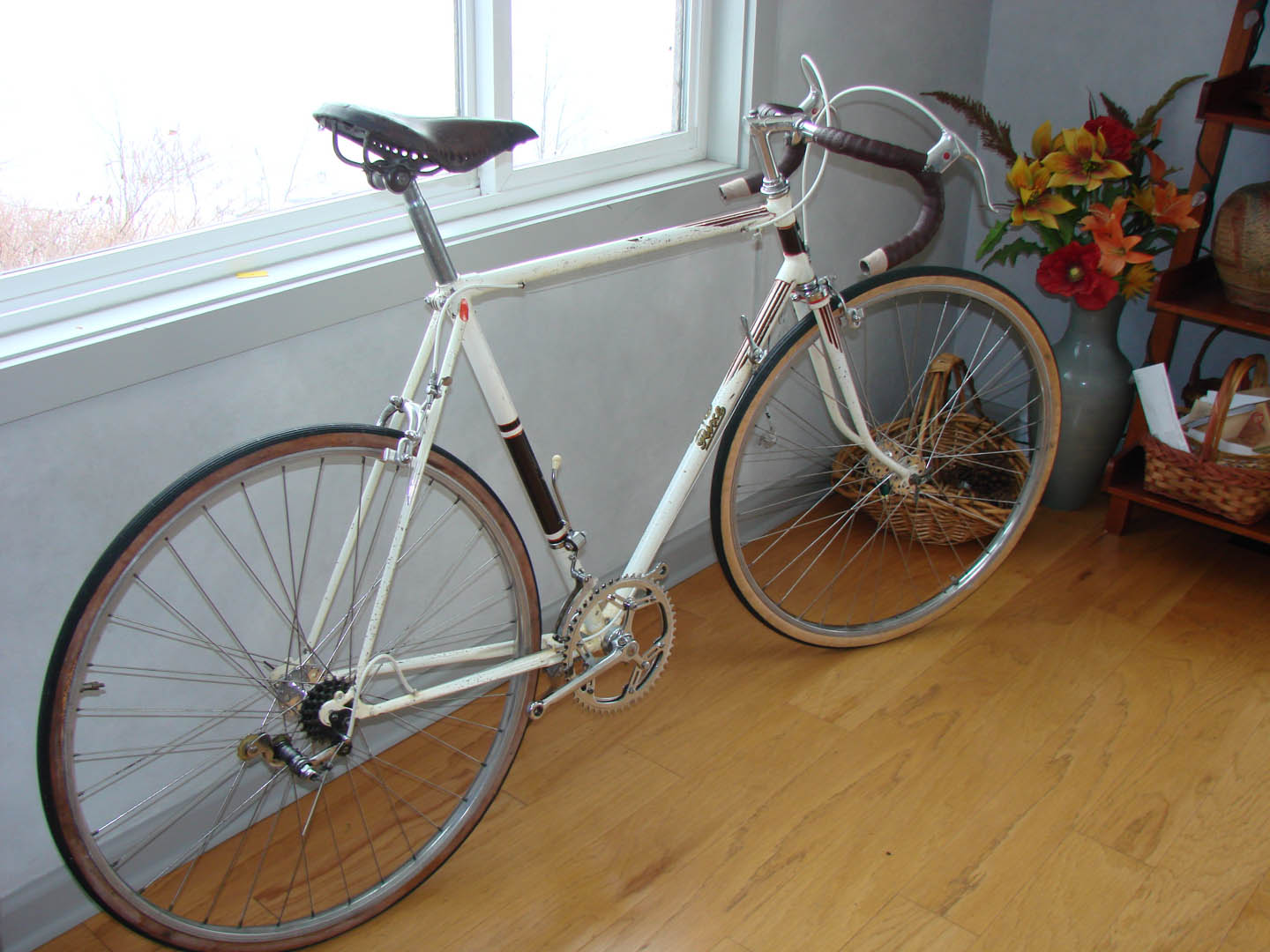
Rixe Club

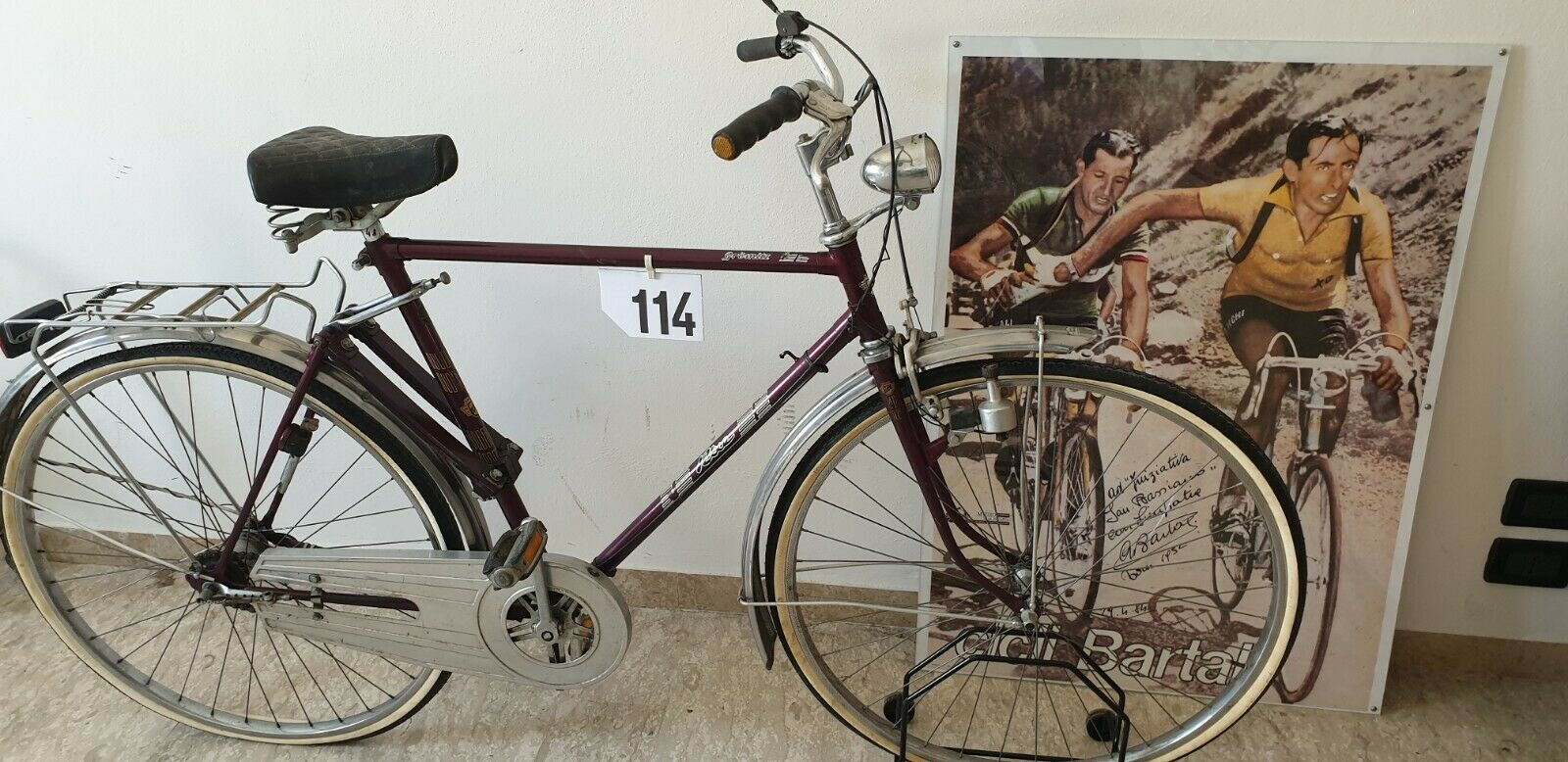
Rixe Suspension

== Rixe Mopeds and Small Motorcycles ==
In 1935, Rixe and Co started producing small motorcycles. In the beginning, they consisted of a bicycle frame with a 98cc Fichtel & Sachs engine attached above the pedals.

Rixe motorized division began to see success with the introduction of models using the Fichtel and Sachs engine, the Saxonette, a motor that was attached to the rear wheel.

In December 1939, Rixe & Co stopped producing bicycles and motorized two wheelers to produce materials for World War II.

In 1948, motorized two wheel production resumed. Post-war the need for affordable transportation was great. Rixe utilized the more affordable 2 stroke engine technology and produced mopeds and small motorcycles using Fichtel and Sachs and ILO engines with displacements of 47 cc (2.9 cu in) and 98 cc (6.0 cu in), 150cc (9 cu in), and the range topping 250 cc (15 cu in).

Production of mopeds and small motorcycles continued until Rixe & Co declared bankruptcy and closed their doors in 1984.

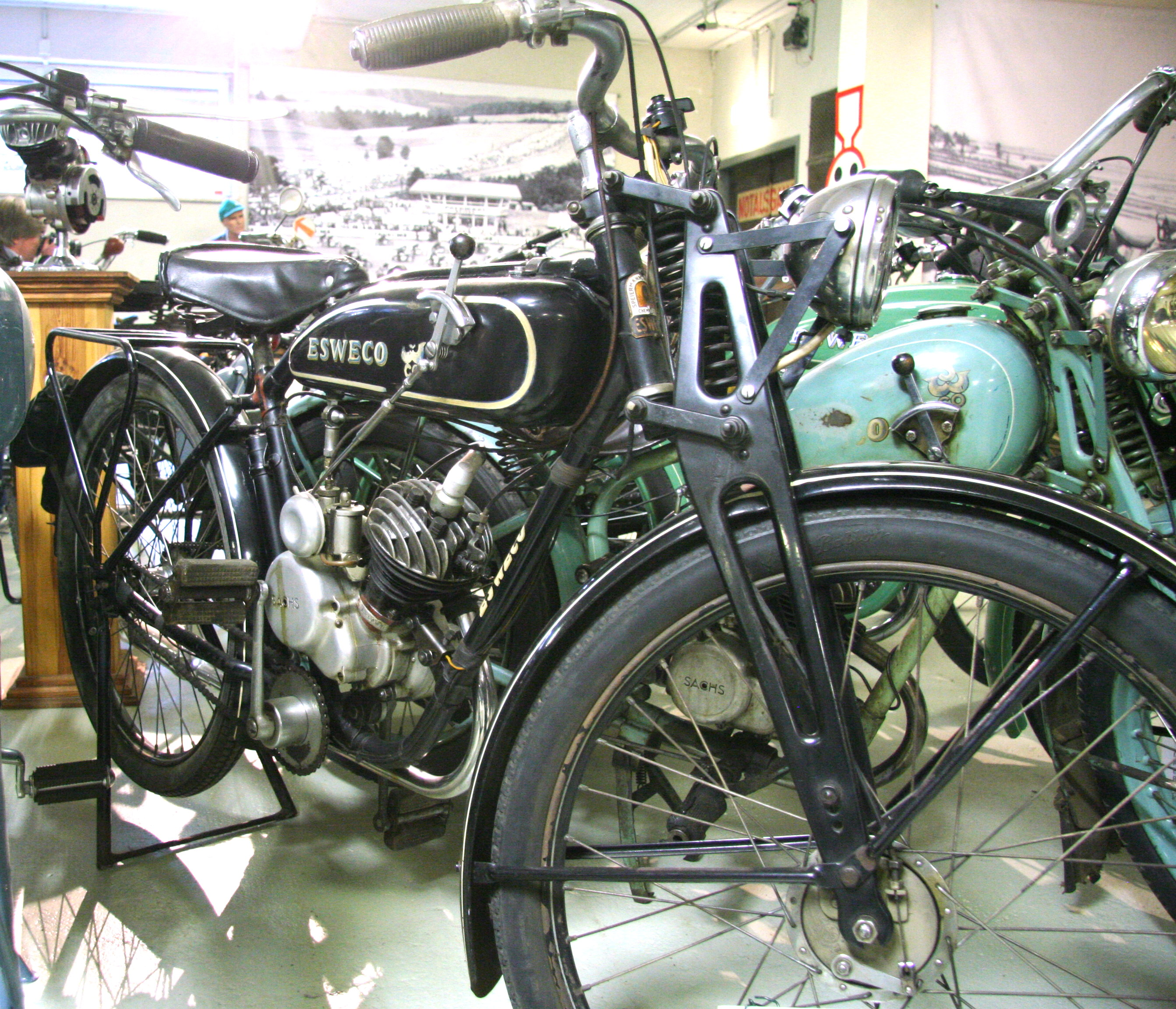
1936 Esweco Rixe

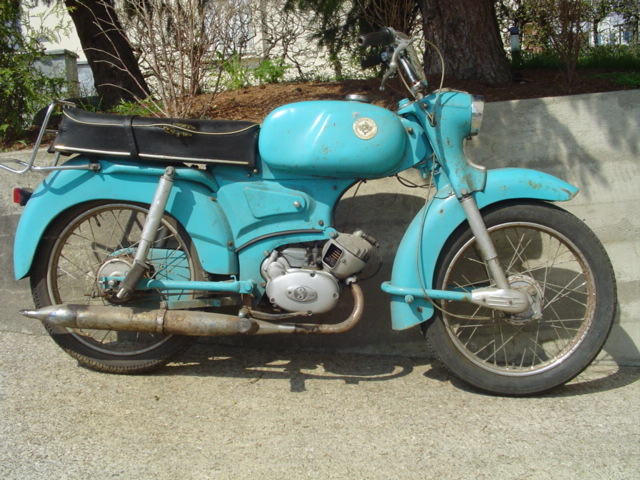

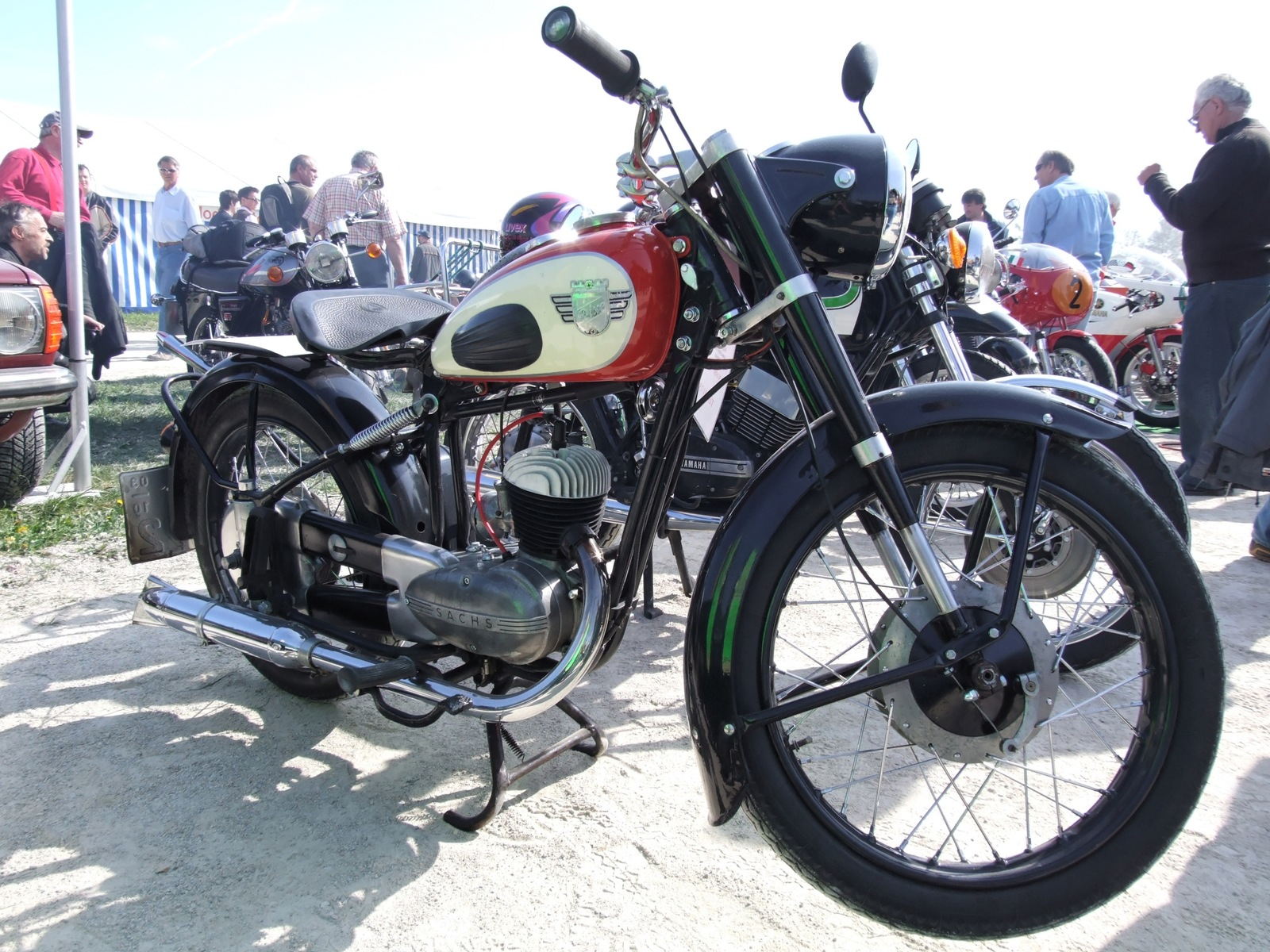
1953 Rixe 175

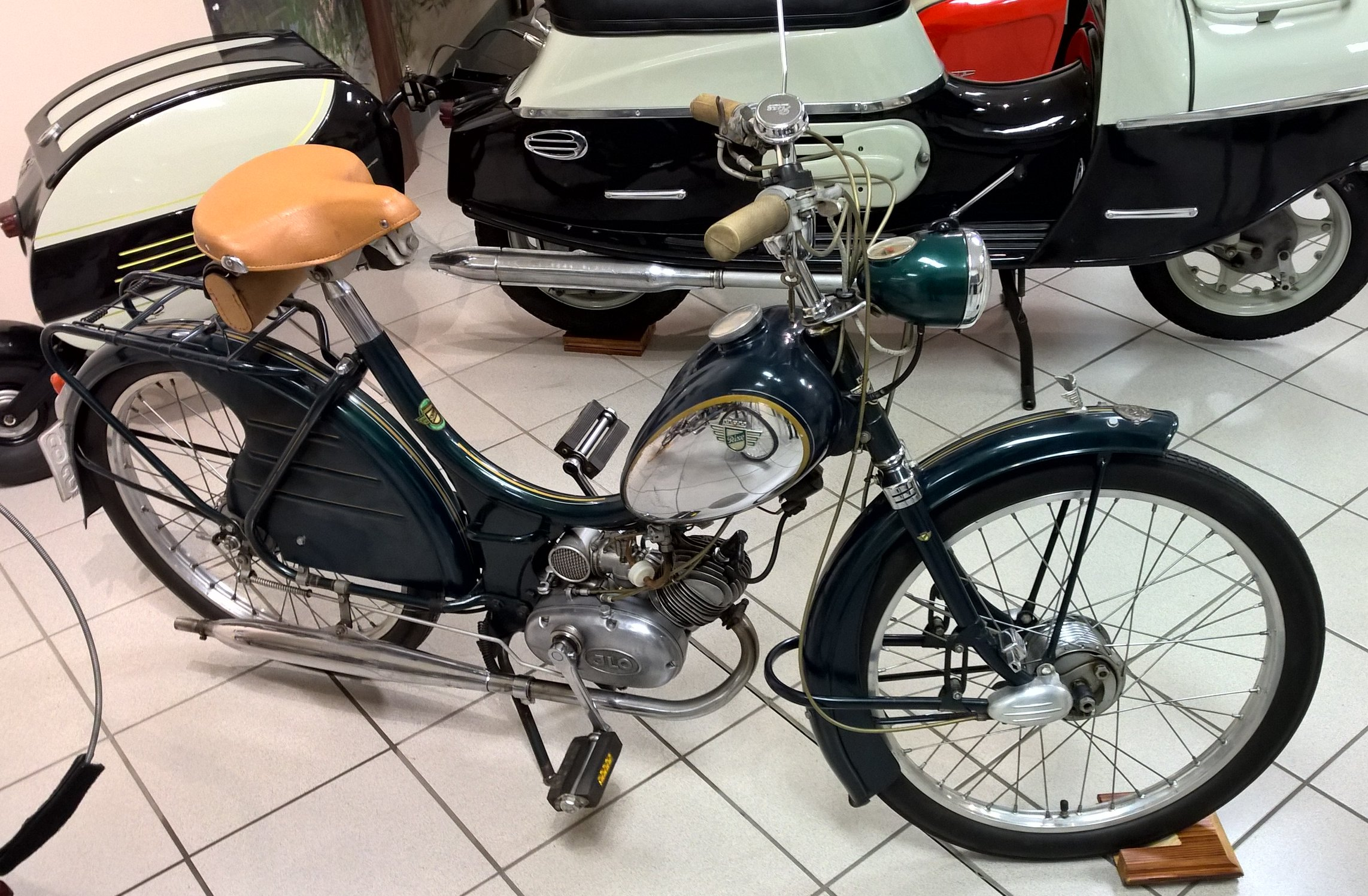
1957 Rixe De-Luxe

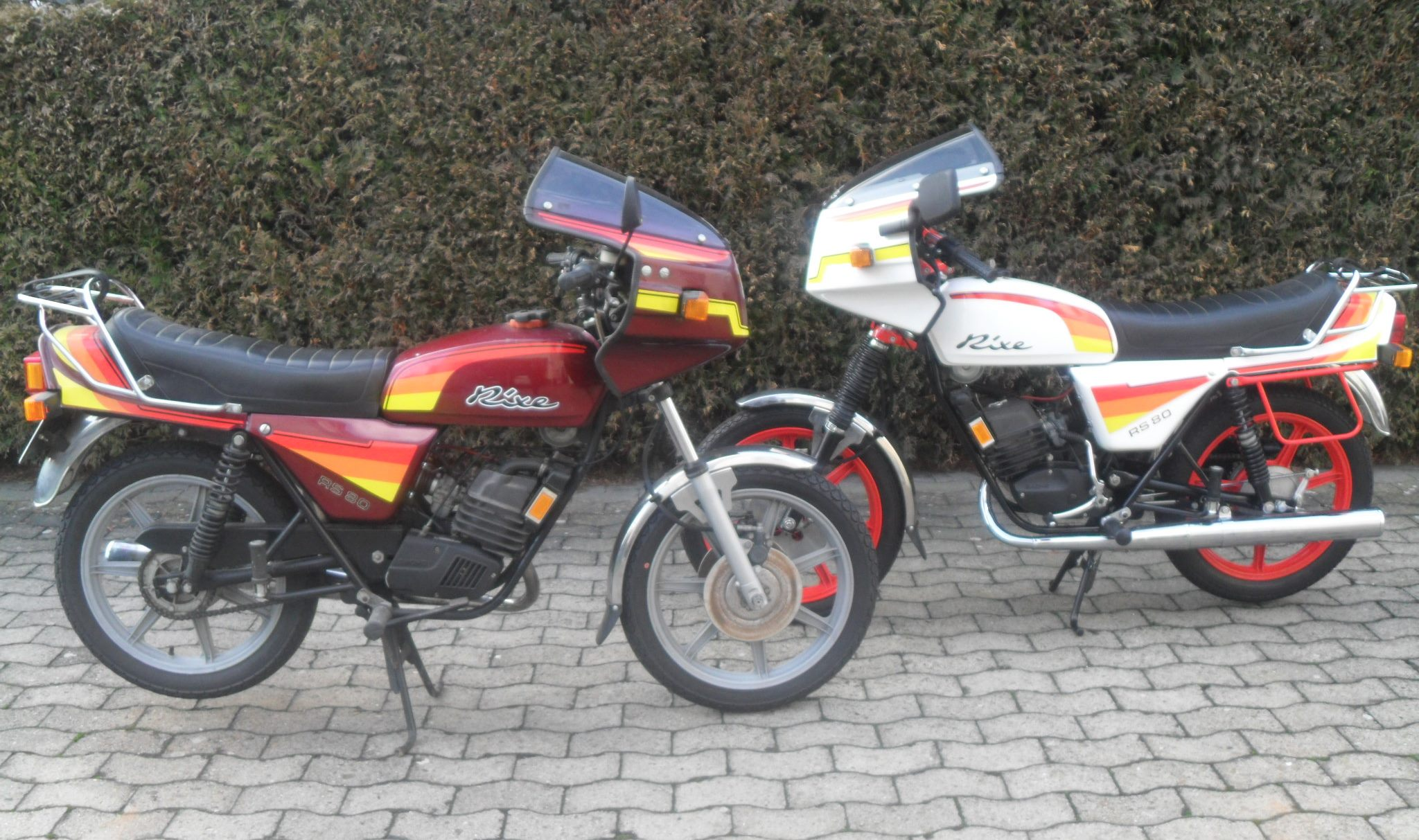
Rixe RS 80
