= Kalkhoff =

German bicycle manufacturer

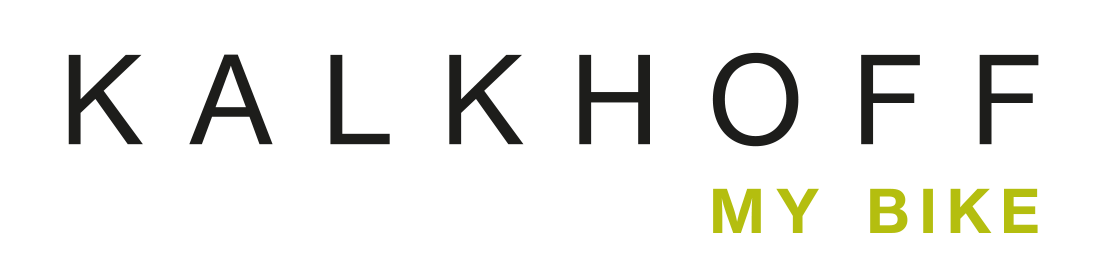
Kalkhoff logo

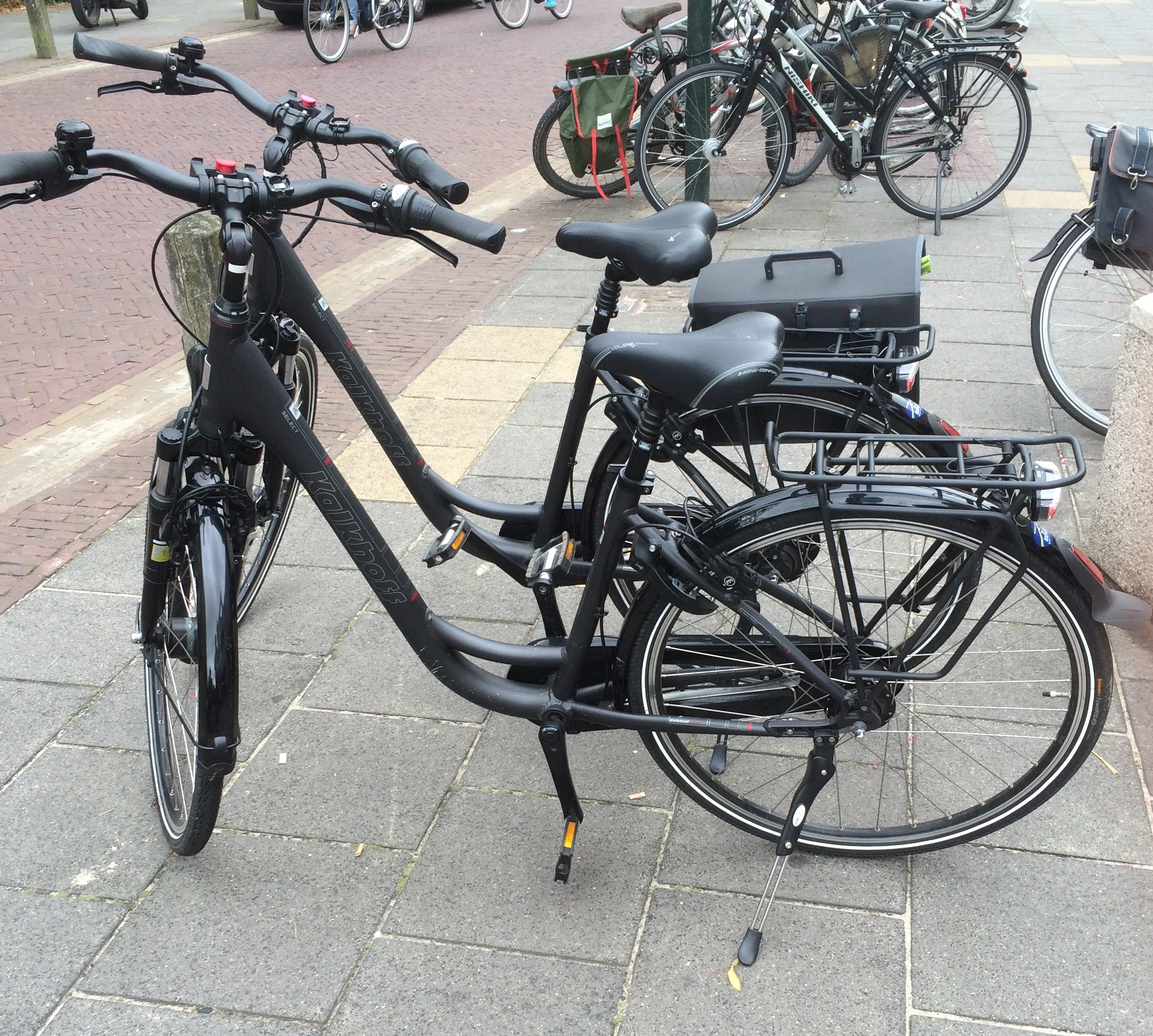
Kalkhoff bicycle

Kalkhoff is a German bicycle manufacturer based in Cloppenburg; it was founded in 1919 by Heinrich Kalkhoff (* 30. November 1903; † 25. September 1972) as a family business.

Founded as a first small workshop in Kalkhoff's parents' house, the company grew steadily. By 1939, more than 700,000 frames for bicycles were produced. The war forced the company to convert to the production of military equipment. After the end of the second World War, Kalkhoff initially manufactured everyday goods such as trailers and boilers. Only in 1950 did bicycle production resume, with the production of bicycles for leisure and everyday use. During the 1950s' bicycle boom, Kalkhoff expanded to 1200 employees and daily production reached 5000 frames. In 1968, Heinrich Kalkhoff left the company and turned management over to his sons Karl, Heinz and Berthold Kalkhoff. Increased competition from abroad led to a downturn in business, which eventually led to insolvency and bankruptcy in 1986. Kalkhoff was acquired in 1989 by Derby Cycle Corporation. Production of Kalkhoff bicycles continues at the Derby Cycle factory in Cloppenburg, Germany.

The brand is protected.
