= Tatsumi Kimishima =

Japanese businessman (born 1950)

- 君島 達己

5th President of Nintendo
- In office September 16, 2015 – June 28, 2018
- Preceded by: Satoru Iwata
- Succeeded by: Shuntaro Furukawa

2nd President of Nintendo of America
- In office January 8, 2002 – May 25, 2006
- Preceded by: Minoru Arakawa
- Succeeded by: Reggie Fils-Aimé

Personal details
- Born: April 21, 1950 (age 76) Tokyo, Japan
- Education: Hitotsubashi University

Tatsumi Kimishima (君島 達己, Kimishima Tatsumi; born April 21, 1950) is a Japanese businessman who served as the 5th president of Nintendo from September 2015 to June 2018. He was formerly the president of Nintendo of America from January 2002, succeeding Minoru Arakawa, until Reggie Fils-Aimé took his place in May 2006. In May 2006, he became CEO and chairman of the board of Nintendo of America, and retained this position until June 2018.

He was promoted to managing director in June 2013 and was named the fifth president of the company in September 2015, succeeding Satoru Iwata, who died in July 2015. Kimishima stepped down as president in June 2018 and was succeeded by Shuntaro Furukawa.

== Career ==
=== Sanwa Bank ===
Kimishima was born in Tokyo, Japan on April 21, 1950. After graduating from Hitotsubashi University, he joined Sanwa Bank in 1973, working there for 27 years. Kimishima dealt with corporate planning, international business development, corporate communications, and promotions. During his 27-year tenure at Sanwa Bank, Kimishima was posted in New York City; Los Angeles, California; and San Francisco, California in the United States, in Central America and the Caribbean.

=== Pokémon ===
Kimishima was approached by Hiroshi Yamauchi, who wanted someone outside of the video game industry to oversee the finances of an American subsidiary for the popular Pokémon franchise. Kimishima accepted the position, and was appointed chief financial officer of The Pokémon Company in December 2000. In 2001, Kimishima was appointed president of Pokémon USA Inc where he stayed for a year. During Kimishima's early time working there, a number of popular Pokémon games were released.

=== Nintendo ===
Yamauchi appointed Kimishima to become president of Nintendo of America in January 2002. He was previously working as the head of Nintendo's Pokémon division. Four years after Kimishima's promotion, he was promoted again, but this time, to the position of chief executive officer and chairman of the board at Nintendo of America.

In June 2013, Kimishima was named managing director of Nintendo, as well as general manager of Corporate Analysis and Administration and general manager of the General Affairs Division.

==== President ====
On September 14, 2015, following the death of Iwata in July 2015, Kimishima was sworn in as the fifth president of Nintendo. Shigeru Miyamoto and Genyo Takeda were also put into senior advisory roles as "Creative Fellow" and "Technology Fellow", respectively. Kimishima described his desire to follow Iwata's general strategy, stating that "Takeda and Miyamoto will be in charge of software development, while I control administration". In May 2016, Kimishima announced that Nintendo was going to start its own film production, and that they were looking for filmmakers for their projects. As President of Nintendo, Kimishima also oversaw the launch of the Nintendo Switch, and appeared in the 2017 Nintendo Switch Presentation. Kimishima stepped down as president on June 28, 2018, and was succeeded by Shuntaro Furukawa. Kimishima remains at Nintendo as an Executive Advisor.

Business positions
Preceded by Minoru Arakawa	President of Nintendo of America; 2002 – 2006	Succeeded by Reggie Fils-Aimé

Business positions
Preceded by Satoru Iwata	President of Nintendo; 2015 – 2018	Succeeded by Shuntaro Furukawa
