= List of Japanese bicycle brands and manufacturers =

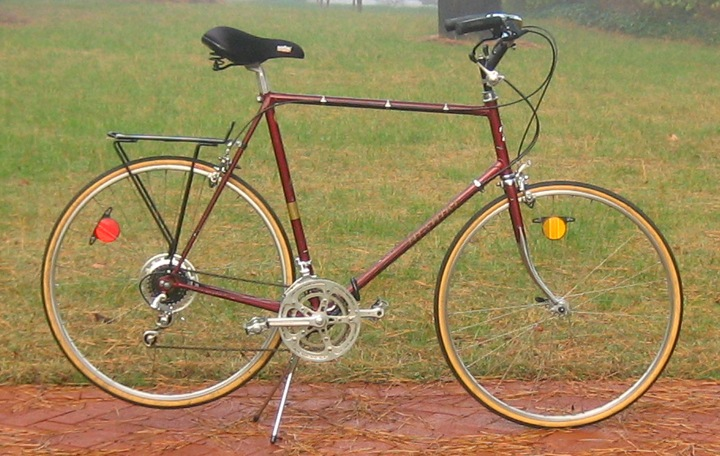
1977 Nishiki International Typical 1970s Bike boom ten-speed road bike Japanese bicycle brands such as Fuji, Miyata, Panasonic/National, Bridgestone, Univega and Nishiki had enjoyed tremendous success during the United States' 1970s bike boom, only to suffer in the late 1980s. Because of the steep rise in the Yen's value, Nishiki and Univega were ultimately absorbed by Derby International, and manufacture of Nishiki bicycles was moved from Japan in 1989 to Giant Bicycles in Taiwan. Derby discontinued the Nishiki brand in the United States in 2001. Pictured: 1977 Nishiki International Manufactured: Kawamura Cycle, Kobe, Japan Frame: Lugged, plain gauge Cromoly Fork: high-tensile steel Rear Derailleur Suntour Cyclone Front Derailluer: Suntour Cyclone Stem Shifters: Suntour Brakes: Diacompe, single pivot side-pull Rims: Araya 27 × 1.25, 36 count spokes Hubs: Shimano Crank: Sugino Super Maxy Seat stem: LaPrade Non-standard equipment: handlebars, saddle, chrome cable guides, rear rack

This is a list of Japanese bicycle brands and manufacturers — as well as brands with models manufactured in Japan.

== Japanese Bicycle Brands and Manufacturers ==
- 3 Rensho
- Amanda (Tokyo)
- Amuna (written "AMVNA", manufactured by Sendai-based Matsumoto Cycle)
- A.N. Design Works (Core Japan, Tokyo)
- Araya
- ARES
- Asuka (Nara)
- Baramon (Kurume)
- Campania
- Cherubim (Machida, Tokyo)
- Crafted (Fukui)
- Deki
- Doppo, by Simworks
- Elan
- Emme Akko (Miyako)
- Focus (a mid-1980s brand produced by Araya)
- Fuji
- Fury
- Ganwell (Kyoto)
- Hirose (Kodaira, Tokyo)
- Holks
- Honjo (Tottori)
- Ikesho
- Iribe (Nara)
- Kabuki, see Bridgestone
- Kalavinka (made by Tsukumo, Tokyo)
- Kaze and Kaze Race Bicycles
- Kobe limited, Kobe, Japan
- Kusano Engineering (Tokyo)
- Kyoso (Tokyo)
- Level (Tokyo—Established in 1980)
- Lightning (made by Inazuma Cycle)
- Makino Cycle
- Maruishi
- Marukin (White Sails) apparently a subsidiary of Hodaka Corp.
- Mikado
- Kiyo Miyazawa (Tokyo)
- Miyata Japon (introduced by Miyata in 2011, produced at its factory in Chigasaki in Kanagawa Prefecture )
- Miyuki (Tokyo)
- Mypallas
- Mizutani (ミズタニ自転車株式会社) (Tokyo) (Established in 1924)
- Nagasawa (Osaka—Established in 1976)
- Nakamichi
- Noko
- Ono
- Panasonic
- Pegasus (Chofu, Tokyo)
- Pie
- Polaris
- Project M (Tsukuba, Ibaraki)
- Raizin (Kiryu, Gunma)
- Ravanello (made by Takamura, Tokyo)
- Reminton
- Rinsei Lab (Tochigi—Established in 2012)
- Royal Norton
- Royce Union
- San Rensho (3Rensho)
- Sannow
- Sekai
- Sekine
- Shimazaki (Tokyo)
- Shogun
- Silk
- Skyway
- Smith
- Soma
- SR (Sakae Ringyo), purchased later by Mori Industries, merged with Suntour
- Suntour, purchased later by Mori Industries, merged with SR
- Takara
- Tano
- Terry
- Toei (Kawaguchi, Saitama)
- Tokyobike
- Toyo
- Tsunoda (Nagoya, Japan — also manufactured Lotus brand)
- Tubagra
- Vigore (Kyoto)
- Vlaams
- Vortex star ( usmans)
- Vogue (made by Orient, Kamakura)
- Zebrakenko
- Zunow (Osaka)

=== Manufacturers ===
- Alps Bicycle Industrial Co., Ltd., associated with Uchikanda Bicycle Shop in Tokyo from 1918 until its closure in 2007; specialized in made-to-order touring bicycles and equipment
- Araya, a manufacturer of bicycle rims and of the Focus bicycle brand
- Bridgestone (variously marketed as Anchor, C.Itoh, Kabuki)
- CatEye (famous for cycling parts and accessories; also manufactures exercise bikes)
- Kawamura Cycle, Kobe, Japan (manufactured Nishiki and Azuki brands for an American company)
- Kuwahara, headquartered in Osaka and producer of both bicycle brands and parts
- Miyata (has produced both domestic- and foreign-brand bicycles since the 19th century)
- Otomo (produced several OEM bikes for different brands)
- Panasonic Cycle Technology, Panasonic Company's bicycle subsidiary
- Shimano (produces bicycle parts)

=== Foreign Brands Manufactured in Japan ===
- American Eagle, later Nishiki (a line of bikes manufactured for export into the US by Kobe-based Kawamura Cycle Company from 1965 until 1989; owned by WCC, West Coast Cycle)
- American Star (a brand manufactured in Japan in the 1960s and early 1970s)
- Apollo (a Canadian brand manufactured by Kuwahara, marketed by Fred Deeley Imports of Vancouver)
- Azuki (a line of bikes manufactured for export into the US by Kobe-based Kawamura Cycle Company; owned, along with the Nishiki line, by WCC or West Coast Cycle)
- Bianchi (certain models manufactured in Japan)
- Centurion (manufactured in Japan for export into the US by American company Western States Import Company or WSI; the brand and base of manufacture were consolidated with WSI's other brand Diamond Back in 1990 until the company's closure in 2000.)
- Diamond Back (manufactured in Japan for export into the US by American company Western States Import Company or WSI between 1979 and 1984; consolidated with WSI's other brand Centurion in 1990 until the company closed in 2000.)
- Peugeot (certain models manufactured in Japan)
- Puch (certain models manufactured in Japan)
- Raleigh Bicycle Company (certain models manufactured in Japan by Bridgestone in the early 1980s)
- Suteki, a brand marketed by Sears and manufactured by Panasonic Company's bicycle subsidiary Panasonic Cycle Technology
- Le Tour (manufactured in Japan for the American Schwinn company)
- Lotus (manufactured by Nagoya-based Tsunoda Bicycle Corporation for an American company from 1980 until the end of the decade)
- World Traveler (road bike manufactured for Schwinn by Panasonic Company's bicycle subsidiary Panasonic Cycle Technology in the 1970s)
- World Voyager (touring bike manufactured for Schwinn by Panasonic Company's bicycle subsidiary Panasonic Cycle Technology in the 1970s)
- Univega (an American brand manufactured in Japan from the 1970s until the late 1980s)

== See also ==
- List of bicycle brands and manufacturing companies
- List of Australian bicycle brands and manufacturers
