= Nishiki (bicycle company) =

American bicycle brand name

- Industry: Bicycles
- Founded: 1965; 61 years ago
- Founders: Leo Cohen Sr. RosaBelle Cohen
- Products: Bicycle
- Owner: Kron Bicycle (2026-present)
- Website: www.nishiki.com

Nishiki headbadge (c.1977). Early Nishiki Logo: The early Nishiki logo derived from the American Eagle logo, which was largely identical and featured an eagle head along with the tri-color square. Kawamura Cycle, the original manufacturer of Nishiki bikes, had used a tri-color square in its domestic marketing — the three colors symbolizing passion for the customer (red), quality products (yellow) and sincerity in business (blue). WCC sought and received permission from Kawamura to use the same mark within the Nishiki logo and in their company marketing.

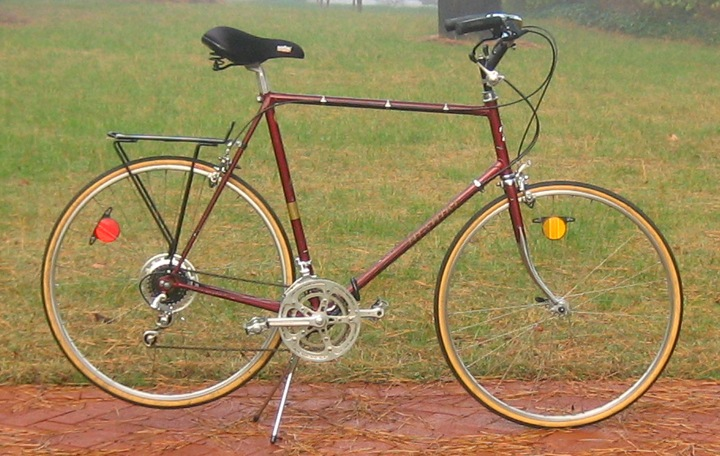
1977 Nishiki International Ten speed road bike Manufacturer: Kawamura Cycles, Kobe, Japan U.S. Importer: West Coast Cycle Frame: Lugged, plain gauge Cromoly Fork: high-tensile steel Rear Derailleur Suntour Cyclone Front Derailleur: Suntour Cyclone Stem Shifters: Suntour Brakes: Dia-compe, single pivot side-pull Rims: Araya 27 x 1.25, 36 count spokes Hubs: Shimano Crank: Sugino Super Maxy Seat stem: LaPrade Non-standard equipment: handlebars, saddle, chrome cable guides, rear rack

1971 advertisement: American Eagle Bikes, American Bicyclist Magazine, with 'KB Bicycles' signifying 'Kawamura-Built'

Nishiki is a brand of bicycles designed, specified, marketed and distributed by West Coast Cycle in the USA, initially manufactured by Kawamura Cycle Co. in Japan, and subsequently by Giant of Taiwan. After using the American Eagle name since 1965, its bicycles were marketed under the Nishiki brand until 2001.

Throughout the U.S. bike boom of the 1970s and into the 1980s, Nishiki and West Coast Cycle competed with domestic companies including Schwinn, Huffy, and Murray; European companies including Raleigh, Peugeot and Motobecane—as well as other nascent Japanese brands including Miyata, Fuji, Bridgestone, Panasonic, Univega, Lotus and Centurion—itself a line of Japanese-manufactured bicycles that were specified, distributed and marketed by Western States Imports (WSI), a U.S. company similar to West Coast Cycle. Japanese-manufactured bikes succeeded in the U.S. market until currency fluctuations in the late 1980s made them less competitive, leading companies to source bicycles from Taiwan.

As of 2013, Nishiki Europe was marketing bicycle models in Denmark, Finland, and Sweden. In 2010, Dick's Sporting Goods acquired the licensing rights to the Nishiki brand for the U.S. market and began marketing Nishiki-branded bicycles and accessories.

On February 4, 2026, it was announced that Nishiki had been acquired by Kron Bicycle.

== History ==
=== West Coast Cycle and the Cohens ===
West Coast Cycle was founded by Leo Cohen Sr. and RosaBelle Cohen who had previously been partners in Wheel Goods Corporation in Minneapolis, later moving to Los Angeles in 1946 to purchase an existing retail bicycle store, Atlas Cycle, renaming it Playrite Bicycle Supply Co.. The Cohens subsequently founded a bicycle, parts and accessory distribution company in the late 1950s, naming it West Coast Cycle Supply Company. They operated the company — widely known as West Coast Cycle (or WCC) – with their daughter Louise and sons Leo Jr. and Howie (Howard Sherwin Cohen). Howie Cohen subsequently took over the business, followed by his brother.

When Cohen Sr. died in 1963, Howie Cohen traveled to Japan to find new sources for bicycles, and especially, a Japanese bicycle factory capable of producing high quality bikes that would be welcomed by U.S. independent bike dealers and the bicycling community; bicycles that would be able to compete with American and European-built bicycles.

After visiting over 60 bicycle factories over a period of six weeks, Cohen turned to Kawamura Cycles. Kawamura had produced quality bicycles for the Japan domestic market, but at the directive of their overseas buyers, had produced lower-quality, lower-priced bicycles for the U.S. market, for example, under the brand name 'Royce Union'.

Cohen also created working relationships with Japanese bicycle parts manufacturers including Asahi, Araya, Dia-Compe, Kashima, Kusuki, Kyokuto (KKT), Mikashima (MKS), Mitsuboshi, Taihei, Sanshin, Shimano, Sugino, Takagi, Suntour and others. Cohen travelled to Japan 8-10 times per year while developing his brands (American Eagle, Nishiki, Azuki and CyclePro).

Cohen placed his initial order for 570 bikes with Kawamura, selling them under the American Eagle brand. WCC sold tens of thousands of American Eagle bikes before changing the name – when a customer suggested it was disingenuous to put such an American-sounding name on a Japanese product.

WCC wanted a new, Japanese name that was easy to pronounce, with an inoffensive translation – and a name not easily mispronounced for comic or derisive effect. Cohen held a contest with Kawamura factory workers for Japanese names, choosing Nishiki for WCC's primary, nationwide line of bikes (after Saga Nishiki and the gold Nishiki thread often woven into wedding kimono) – and Azuki for the secondary bicycle line (after the sweetened, red Azuki bean), using the chrysanthemum as the Azuki logo.

The Azuki brand was initially manufactured by Kuwahara, not Kawamura, and therefore not identical to the Nishiki brand. The evidence for Azuki's manufacturer is in the serial numbers, Later, some Azuki models were manufactured by Kawamura. A second line allowed WCC to market essentially identical bikes through more than a single dealership in a sales territory. Louisville Cycle & Supply (Louisville, KY) were sub-distributors for both brands in the Southeast, and Pettee Cycle (Denver, CO) were sub-distributors of both brands in Colorado and surrounding states. Kawamura trademarked both names for the Japanese Domestic Market and Europe, WCC trademarked the brands for the USA. Early promotional material for American Eagle and Nishiki lines often carried the tagline 'KB Bicycles' or simply 'KB' – signifying 'Kawamura-Built'. WCC continued also to market the bicycle brands of Mundo, Caloi, Windsor, Zeus, and Mondia.

Howie Cohen served as President of WCC from 1965 until his retirement in 1976, with WCC subsequently operated by his brother, Leo Jr. and outside investors. Through the 1980s WCC continued to sell Nishiki bikes produced by Kawamura. International currency fluctuations in the late 1980s made Japanese-manufactured bicycles far more expensive and less competitive in the United States, leading WCC to move Nishiki production to Giant of Taiwan. Leo Cohen and his associates later sold West Coast Cycle to Medalist – with Derby International eventually acquiring the rights from West Coast Cycle to market bikes under the Nishiki brand in the United States.

In 1977 some Nishiki models began to come from Giant of Taiwan. Over time more models were made by Giant. Kawamura manufactured frames continued until the 1987, for the 1988 model year. In 1988, Derby International took over the Nishiki brand in the USA. There were no more bicycles from Kawamura and early in 1989 no more bicycles supplied by Giant. The evidence for this is in the frame serial numbers.

After manufacture of Nishiki bikes shifted to Giant, Kawamura continued manufacturing bicycles for the Japanese and European markets (including private label bikes for Takara, Schwinn, and others), to be subsequently acquired by the sporting goods company Mizuno.

Howie Cohen later founded the company Everything Bicycles, working with Kuwahara to build and import BMX bikes carrying the Kuwahara brand name, developing the first major BMX distributorship – and ultimately supplying Kuwahara bicycles for the 1982 movie E.T. and securing the right to market the "ET Bicycle." To make the Kuwahara brand name a household word, Cohen ran a promotion giving free stickers to children who called a toll-free phone number and could correctly pronounce the brand name. In 1989, Cohen sold the Kuwahara name back to the Japanese parent company. In 1992, Cohen returned to the bicycle industry to assist the Gary Fisher bike brand – 18 months later brokering the acquisition of Gary Fisher Mountain Bikes by Trek Bicycle Corporation.

Cohen later worked as a consultant in the bicycle industry for several companies, including Rotor Componentes of Spain, and subsequently retired from Lomita, California to Colorado where he and his wife, Kay (Kay Piercy Guithues Cohen) catalogued his collection of bicycling memorabilia and maintained his website, HowieBikeMan.com.

When Howie Cohen died on July 11, 2013, Bicycle Retailer said he was "a hugely influential figure in developing the U.S. BMX market and arguably the first person to bring high-quality Asian-made bikes to America." retired from Lomita, California.

=== Derby ===
From 1989 through 2001, Derby International marketed bikes in the United States under the Nishiki as well as Univega, Haro, and Raleigh brand names. Some of the all terrain bikes and mountain bike models were designed in partnership with famed mountain bike designer and Mountain Bike Hall of Fame member R. Cunningham and have his name on the frames. These Nishiki models, though manufactured outside Japan (e.g., in Taiwan, by Giant Bicycles and possibly in Italy by Colnago, Olmo or Viner) often carried the name Nashiki and some of the same model names as had been used on the Kuwahara-built bicycles. The brand name Nishiki was retired by Derby in 2001 in North America. As of 2010, Nishiki-branded bicycles, manufactured by Accell Group were available for sale again in the U.S. at Dick's Sporting Goods. Dick's had obtained licensing rights to the Nishiki Bike brand in the U.S.

Currently (2013), Nishiki Europe, an unrelated group of European distributors markets bicycle models in Denmark, Finland, and Sweden. Nishiki bikes had previously been also marketed in Norway, Belgium, Germany, the Netherlands, Luxembourg, and Estonia.

== Models ==
- Apache
- Aero, Aero II
- Alamosa
- Alouette
- Alien
- Anasazi
- Ariel
- Arrow Speed
- Arroyo
- Barbarian
- Backroads
- Bel Air
- Blazer
- Bombardier
- Bravo
- Bushwhaker
- Carrera
- Cascade
- Century
- Cervino (possibly uncataloged)
- Citi Sport
- Colorado
- Comp, Comp II and Comp III
- Competition
- Continental
- Custom Sport
- Cresta
- Crossroads
- Expedition (made in Taiwan)
- Fusion (Aluminum time-trial bike)
- Gran Sport
- Gran Tour 15 (probable precursor to Ultra Tour 18)
- Hill Razer (24" Kids' ATB)
- International (earlier named Kokusai)
- Katmandu
- Kodiak
- Kokushi (later renamed International)
- Landau
- Linear
- Maricopa
- Manitoba
- Marina
- Maxima (possibly uncataloged, frame only)
- Medalist
- Meridian
- Modulus
- Mountain
- Navajo
- NFS Alpha
- NFS Beta
- NFS Altron
- Odyssey
- Olympiad (American Eagle)
- Olympic, Olympic Royal
- Prestige
- Professional
- Pueblo
- Race Master
- Rally
- Regal
- Riviera
- Road Compe
- Road Master
- Rockhound
- Royale
- Safari
- Saga (Cunningham Design drop bar ATB)
- Sebring
- Seral (uncatalogued, spec'd like Continental)
- Semi-Pro (American Eagle)
- Sport, Custom Sport
- sTORM
- Stony Point (mountain bike)
- Super-five
- Superbe
- Team Issue
- Timbuk
- Tri-A
- Triathlon
- Trim Master
- Ultimate
- Ultima (possibly uncatalogued)
- Ultra Tour (uncatalogued, possibly specified by one store in Southern California, USA)
- Ultra Tour 18 (probable successor to Gran Tour 15)
- Westwood

== Serial Numbers ==
Serial Numbers for Nishiki bikes were decoded by Tom Marshall, using a trial and error database methodology.

Kawamura manufactured frames (1972–1987): These frames used a serial number XYZZZZZ format where:

- X is the market (A = Australia, C = Canada (pre 1987), E = Europe, K = USA (pre 1985) + non-ferrous frames 1986–1988), W = USA (1985–1987)).
- Y is the last digit of the manufacturing calendar year (A =1, B = 2, C = 3... J = 0. Exception is letter S, used on all frames prior to 1975).
- ZZZZZ is a five or six digit number, possibly representing a sequential frame manufacturing number for the year (or era in the case of pre 1975 frames).

Example 1: KA24587 is the 24,587th frame produced in 1981 for the US market
Example 2: CG23117 is the 23,117th frame produced in 1977 for the Canadian market
Example 3: WE54612 is the 54,612th frame produced in 1985 for the US market

Giant manufactured frames (1980-1986*): With a date code generally stamped on the dropout on the drive side of the bike, these frames used a two part serial number in a G MM YY format, where:

- G = Giant.
- MM = month (01 = Jan, 02 = Feb, etc.).
- YY = year (80 = 1980, 81 = 1981, etc.).

Example: G0384 is a Giant-manufactured frame from March 1984

== See also ==
- Saga Nishiki
- List of bicycle brands and manufacturing companies
- Giant Manufacturing - Giant was the original equipment manufacturer for Nishiki of Japan for several years.
