= Lotus (bicycles) =

Bicycle brand

Lotus was a brand of bicycles designed, specified, marketed and distributed by Lotus International Corp. of Syosset, New York, which had been founded by Sid and Ernst Star. The bikes were offered as a complete range, from entry level to professional models, and were manufactured by Tsunoda Bicycle Corporation of Nagoya, Japan, and subsequently by other manufacturers — including a group of mid-1980s high end models manufactured in Italy, in conjunction with Cinelli.

Lotus International marketed its bikes using an abstraction of the Lotus flower as its logo.

During the U.S. bike boom of the 1970s and into the 1980s, Lotus and Alpha Cycle & Supply competed with domestic companies including Schwinn, TREK, Huffy, and Murray; European companies including Raleigh, Peugeot and Motobecane – as well as other nascent Japanese brands including Miyata, Fuji, Bridgestone, Panasonic, Univega, Centurion and Nishiki. Japanese-manufactured bikes succeeded in the U.S. market until currency fluctuations in the late 1980s made them less competitive, leading companies to source bicycles from Taiwan.

== Lotus International ==
Prior to 1980, Sidney (Sid) Star had marketed Windsor bicycles in the US through his company, Alpha Cycle & Supply Corp., modifying Windsor's designs to be competitive in the US market. His son, Ernst Star left a university job in 1980 to join with his father and start a new brand, manufactured in Japan — creating and registering the Lotus brand at that time, and turning to Tsunoda of Japan for manufacturing. Together they subsequently formed Lotus International Corp. to handle Lotus bicycles exclusively, dropping Windsor bicycles.

Windsor cycles, which had been manufactured by Acer Mex, had been successful for Alpha — but had required quality control attention due to the reorganization of the factory in Mexico City. Both Windsor and Lotus cycles received the top ratings in the Consumer Reports, November 1985 issue.

Lotus International depended heavily on outside financing to fund its growth and when its bank unexpectedly changed hands and interrupted financing, the company was nearly forced into bankruptcy. A breach of contract suit followed with an undisclosed settlement. There was still a demand for Lotus bicycles, and the company was forced to deal with an assortment of third-party distributors for financial services.

After Sid Star's death in 1990, Ernst Star, who had assumed primary management of Lotus International, dissolved the company, subsequently forming International Licensing & Design Corp. (ILD) — retaining the Lotus brand. Ernst continued to work as a consultant for the design and marketing of Lotus and acquired several licensees during the 1990s — including a company which marketed Lotus bicycles in China, Sears and Walmart in the US, and Group Lotus (Lotus Cars) in the UK. ILD still exists but is no longer involved with Lotus — having sold the mark to Group Lotus prior to 2000. In 2000 Ernst Star returned to academia, becoming a professor at Hofstra University in New York).

== Models ==
Aero
Aero Sport
America
America Mixte
Challenger Challenger SX
Challenger SX Mixte
Cherokee
Classique
Commuter (ATB Series)
Cyclone
Éclair
Elan
Esprit
Excelle

Excelle Mixte
Express
Elite
Explorer
Grand Prix
Grand Prix Luxe
Grand Prix Mixte
Legend
Legend Compe
International
Odyssey
Competition
Pegasus
Prestige

Pro Series 2000M
Pro Series 2000R
Pro Series 3000
Pro Series 4000M
Special
Sport Pursuit
SR Aero
Supreme
Super Pro Aero
Triomphe
Unique
Viking

== See also ==
- List of Japanese bicycle manufacturers
