= Centurion (bicycle company) =

Brand of bicycles

Western States Import Co. Inc.
- Founded: circa 1969 (ceased in 2000)
- Headquarters: Camarillo, California and Newbury Park, California (later location)
- Key people: Mitchell M. Weiner, Co-founder; Junya (Cozy) Yamakoshi, Co-founder, Product Development

Centurion was a brand of bicycles created in 1969 by Mitchell (Mitch) M. Weiner and Junya (Cozy) Yamakoshi, who co-founded Western States Import Co. (WSI) in Canoga Park, California (initially Wil-Go Imports) to design, specify, distribute and market the bicycles. The bikes themselves were manufactured initially in Japan by companies including H. Teams Company of Kobe and later in Taiwan by companies including Merida. The Centurion brand was consolidated with WSI's mountain bike brand DiamondBack in 1990. WSI ceased operations in 2000.

Centurion and WSI competed in the U.S. against domestic and European bicycle manufacturers including Schwinn, Raleigh, Peugeot, Gitane and Motobecane — as well as other nascent Japanese bicycle brands including Miyata, Fuji, Bridgestone, Panasonic, Univega, Lotus and Nishiki — itself a line of Japanese-manufactured bicycles that were specified, distributed and marketed by West Coast Cycles — a U.S. company similar to WSI. Japanese-manufactured bikes succeeded in the U.S. market until currency fluctuations in the late 1980s made them less competitive, leading companies to source bicycles from Taiwan.

WSI marketed the Centurion brand of road and touring bicycles in the United States using the tag line "Where Centurion leads, others must follow" and "A Lifetime Bicycle", offering a warranty without time limit. For a brief period the bikes carried a "Centurion Bicycle Works" headbadge.

The German company Centurion, which still exists, imported Centurion bikes from Japan to Germany from 1976 on and bought the name-rights in 1990.

== History ==
According to Frank J. Berto, Raleigh Industries of America had been looking at a Japanese source for their Grand Prix model. Raleigh America ordered 2,000 bicycles from Tano and Company of Osaka but their parent company in England, TI-Raleigh, disapproved — concerned that the Tano-built bikes were too well made and would have outsold their own British bikes.

Raleigh's sales agent, Mitchell Weiner, who was reading The New Centurions at the time, took receipt of the bikes, placed Centurion decals on the bikes and marketed them successfully, subsequently forming Western State Imports after merging with Rick Wilson's company, Wil-Go of Santa Clara, California. Because the bikes had all been intended as Raleigh Grand Prix models, as Centurions, they carried the colors of the Raleigh America Grand Prix model.

Cozy Yamakoshi served as the company's product development manager, designing the bike's frames, coordinating the manufacture of the bikes by Japanese manufacturers, and importing the bikes into the US. Subsequently, around 1986, Centurion introduced their first Taiwanese built model, the Signet. The Cinelli Equipe Centurion of 1985 (only) was a joint-venture of WSI and Cinelli of Italy.

Early bike sales were limited to the West Coast, with the brand receiving wider exposure by the late 1970s. WSI stopped using the Centurion brand name in 1990, consolidating their road and touring bikes under the Diamond Back (later DiamondBack) brand. While the brand Centurion had become well known, under the new brand name the company's market for road and touring bicycles soon evaporated. Early Diamond Back models (ca. 1990) carried a top tube decal reading "Centurion Designed" and stickers near the bottom bracket reading "Designed in the USA" and "Exclusively built for WSI." Diamondback Bicycles was eventually sold to Raleigh USA, and manufacture was moved to Taiwan.

WSI later opened an office in Van Nuys, California, and eventually maintained offices in Dallas, Texas, Denver, Colorado and Dayton, New Jersey — in addition a headquarters in Newbury Park, California. After Weiner died, the company continued its growth under the management of Mike Bobrick.

Cozy Yamakoshi, product and development manager, worked with Mike Bobrick (Executive President of WSI) and Sandy Finkelman (1947–2005)(Diamond Back team manager and product development) and left Diamond Back in 1986, to start Parkpre Mountain Bike in 1989. Parkpre USA was based in Moorpark, Southern California, USA., producing bikes from the early 1990s until 1998. Ken Yamakoshi, son of Cozy Yamakoshi, is in the process of re-launching Parkpre in the US.

The rights to the brand name Centurion were sold to Germany's Wolfgang Renner in 1991. Renner had imported Centurion to Germany since 1976, including made-extra models like the first German mountainbike "Country". Today, Centurion remains as a German brand with design and engineering in-house.

== Models ==
Centurion eventually marketed a full line of road and touring bikes, with steel construction ranging from full (all eight tubes) high-tensile 1020 steel at the lower end, to full (all eight tubes) chromoly bikes at their high end — with top quality componentry. Notable models included:good speedster

- Centurion Cinelli Equipe: WSI/Centurion and Cinelli offered the co-branded Centurion Cinelli Equipe for model year 1985, as a joint-venture, designed by Cino Cinelli several years after he retired in 1979 and sold Cinelli to the Columbo family, manufacturers of Columbus tubing. The Cinelli Equipe's production was coordinated and supervised by his staff. The bike featured all Cinelli frame components: Columbus SL tubing; chrome chain stay, Cinelli chromed sloped crown, head lugs, bottom bracket shell, handlebars and stem; new-style Cinelli logos embossed on bar and stem, fork crown, seat and seat stays, rear brake bridge and under bottom bracket; Campagnolo dropouts, derraileurs and shifters; Universal 'AER' non-aero brakeset; Ofmega Mistral headset, bottom bracket and crankset; Gipiemme seatpost; Regina chain and CX-S freewheel; Miche "Competition" hubs and Fiamme, Hard Silver tubular rims. Other markings include a "Cinelli Equipe" decal on down-tube just above shifters and on left chain stay; an "Italia: Made in Italy" decal high on seat tube; Columbus tubing decals on fork ("Forcella Originale") and frame ("Acciaio Speciali"); Centurion decals on down-tube (left and right), and a Centurion "C" decal badge on head tube.
- Centurion Pro Tour: Richard Ballantine's "Richard's Bicycle Book" included the Centurion Pro Tour (ultimately manufactured from 1976 to 1984) on his list of "Best Bikes" in both the 1978 and 1982 updates of his book — along with the Schwinn Paramount P-13, a bike that sold for two to three times the price of the Pro-Tour. Like other full-fledged touring bikes, the Pro Tour models featured a longer wheelbase with longer chainstays for smoother ride especially while loaded, full (all eight tubes) chromoly construction for ride compliance, cantilever brakes to allow room for fenders, internal wiring for a bottom bracket generator and numerous braze-ons: two mounts on the fork for the cantilever brakes, two eyelets in back for a rack and a fender, two eyelets on the fork for a rack and a fender, low rack mounting points on the fork, mounts for two bottle cages, mounts for downtube shifters/cable stops, and seat stay mounts for a rack.

== Serial Numbers ==
Centurions (except the Cinelli\Centurion) have serial numbers on the underside of the bottom bracket shell. One way to date a Centurion is to try to find date codes on the bike's components.

Centurion models manufactured in Japan between 1980 and 1990 use a serial number format WXYZZZZ with:

W = a letter, purpose uncertain, possibly indicates a manufacturer or Centurion; X = a number, indicating the calendar year of manufacture; Y = a letter, indicating the fortnight of manufacture (A = wk 1 & 2, B = wk 3 & 4, etc.) ZZZZ = four digit number, probably indicating frame number during fortnight of manufacture.

N4E0283, as an example, would indicate this is the 283rd frame made during the period of weeks 9–10 in 1984. Barring a major components upgrade at some point in a bike's history, one can confirm a bike's age by the dates found on the majority of components in its groupset.

== See also ==
- Nishiki (bicycle)
- List of Japanese bicycle manufacturers
