= Cat's eye =

Cat's eye and other variations may refer to:

== Nature ==
- Cat's Eye Nebula, a planetary nebula

=== Biology ===
- Cat's eye, the visual organ of a cat; see cat senses
- Cat eye snail (Turbo castanea), or other species from the genus Turbo
- Cat's eye snail (Lunella smaragdus), a sea snail endemic to New Zealand
- Cat eye syndrome, a symptom of 'trisomy 22'

=== Mineralogy and gemology ===
- Cymophane, sometimes called "cat's eye"; a variety of the mineral chrysoberyl
- Cat's eye effect, or chatoyancy, the reflective property of certain gems

== Arts and entertainment ==
=== Literature ===
- Cat's Eye (novel), a 1988 novel by Margaret Atwood
- Catseye (novel), a 1961 science fiction novel by Andre Norton
- Catseye (character), Sharon Smith, a character from Marvel Comics
- Catsai, an Amalgam Comics character
- Cat's Eye (manga), a 1981 Japanese manga about three cat burglar sisters

=== Film and TV ===
- Cat's Eye (1985 film), a film based on works by Stephen King
- Cat's Eye (1997 film), a live-action feature film based on the manga above
- Cat's Eyes (TV series), a French television series based on the manga
- C.A.T.S. Eyes, a UK television series
- "Cat's Eyes", a Series C episode of the television series QI (2005)

=== Music ===
- Katseye, a Los Angeles-based girl group
- Cat's Eyes (band), a UK alternative pop duo
- "Cat's Eye" (song), a 1983 song by Anri, later covered by MAX
- "Cat's Eye", a 2016 song by South Korean boy group Astro

== Products ==
- Cat eye glasses, a style of horn-rimmed glasses designed for women
- Cat's eye (toy), a kind of toy marble
- Cat's Eye (cocktail), a gin-based cocktail
- Cat's eye (road), a type of road marker using retroreflectors
- Cat eye tube, an electron tube used as a visual indicator

== Other uses ==
- CatEye Inc., a Japanese company, manufacturer of bicycle lights and reflectors
