= Peugeot UO-8 =

Bicycle manufactured by Cycles Peugeot

The 1977 Peugeot UO 8, as pictured in the 1977 Cycles Peugeot catalog.

The Peugeot UO 8 was a ten-speed bicycle manufactured by Cycles Peugeot during the "bike boom" of the 1970s. It was marketed as a mid-range "racing style" cycle, and was manufactured from sometime in the early 60s until the end of 1980. The model was discontinued for the 1981 model year.

== Components ==
Though the components changed somewhat throughout the years of production, much remained the same.

- Through all years of production, various models of Simplex derailleurs were used.
- Mafac "racer" brakes were also used throughout most of the production run.

== Identification ==
Unlike Peugeot's higher-end PX-10, the UO 8 carries a gold "Tube Special" sticker. Dating a UO-8 manufactured prior to 1979 via the serial number is unreliable at best, though some theories reference the number of digits in the serial and its first digit as indicating the year of manufacture. For example, the serial number "1234567" has seven digits, and begins with a one. This indicates a 1971 model.
