= Miyata =

Japanese manufacturer of bicycles, unicycles, and fire extinguishers

Miyata Cycle Co., Ltd.
- Native name: 株式会社ミヤタサイクル
- Type: Private (K.K)
- Industry: Leisure products
- Founded: 1890; 136 years ago
- Founder: Eisuke Miyata
- Headquarters: Kawasaki-ku, Kawasaki 210 - 0005, Japan
- Area served: Worldwide
- Key people: Shinichiro Takaya (President)
- Products: Bicycles; Unicycles
- Owner: Morita Holdings Corporation (30%); Merida Bikes (70%)
- Website: Official website

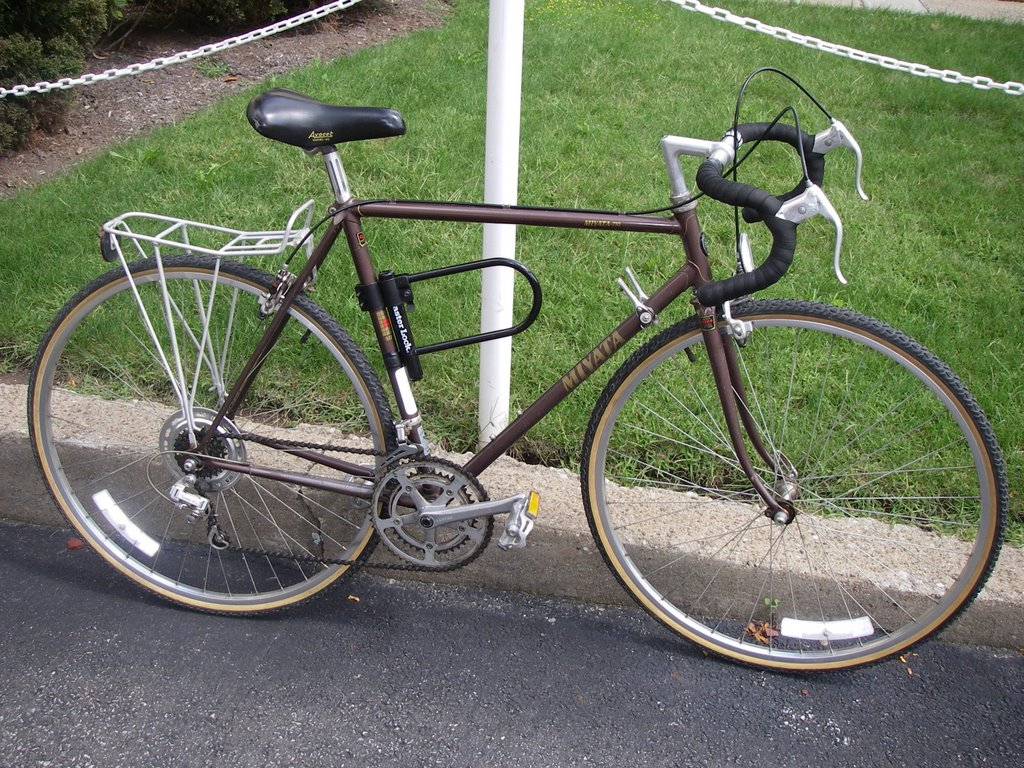
Miyata 710: a high-end Miyata from the late 1970s

Miyata head badge.

Miyata is a Japanese manufacturer of bicycles, unicycles and fire extinguishers. The company has been in operation since 1890. Miyata was also one of the first producers of motorcycles in Japan under the name Asahi. The Asahi AA was the first mass-produced motorcycle in Japan.

Miyata claims to have been the first Japanese manufacturer of flash-butt welded frame tubes (1946) and the first to use electrostatic painting (1950).

== History ==
Miyata was founded by Eisuke Miyata (宮田栄助 1840-1900), a bowyer and engineer from Tokyo who also made components for rickshaws. Eisuke's second son, Eitarō, apprenticed in a local munitions facility and later earned a degree in mechanical engineering from Kyoto University. In 1874, Eisuke moved the family to Shiba and in 1881 opened Miyata Manufacturing in Kyōbashi, Tokyo. The factory produced guns for the Imperial Japanese Army including the Murata rifle, and knives for the Navy. In 1889, a foreigner visited Miyata to ask the gunmakers to repair his bicycle. The engineers repaired the bicycle, and the company began to repair bicycles as a side business.

In 1890, Miyata opened a new factory in Kikukawa, and the company was renamed Miyata Gun Works. Eitarō manufactured the first Miyata prototype bicycle in 1890, using rifle barrels produced at the factory. The early success of Miyata's bicycles was boosted by a request in 1892 from crown prince Yoshihito (later Emperor Taishō) to build him a bicycle. Nonetheless, Miyata halted production of bicycles to focus exclusively on arms manufacture during the First Sino-Japanese War of 1894-95.

Japan changed its laws in 1900 to allow the import of foreign rifles, and the subsequent flooding of the market with cheap imports hurt Miyata's business badly. Upon Eisuke's death on 6 June, Eitarō converted the business entirely to bicycle manufacturing, producing bicycles under the Asahi and Pāson brands. Miyata's entire production of Asahi bicycles was purchased by the Imperial Army until the end of the Russo-Japanese War in 1905.

== Automobiles ==
Miyata began developing automobile technology in 1907. Miyata's first automobile, also named Asahi, debuted at the Kansai Prefectural Association Exhibition in 1910. The first Asahi automobile was a two-passenger car with an air-cooled, two-cylinder engine.

== Motorcycles ==
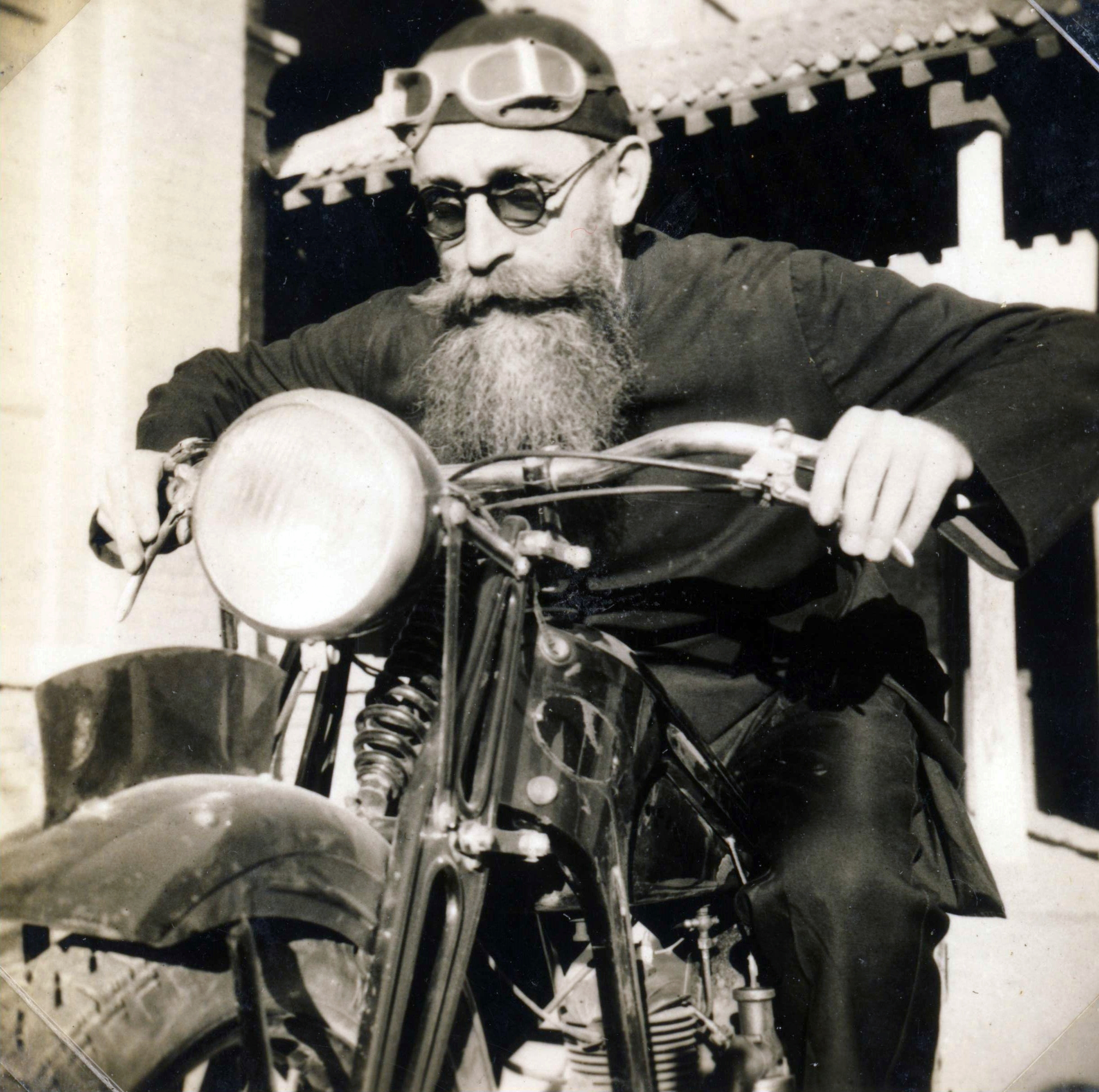
A Jesuit missionary on an Asahi motorcycle in China in 1939

Motorcycles gained popularity in Japan in the early years of the 20th century as foreigners began bringing British and German machines to the country. The Japanese government officially allowed commercial import of foreign motorcycles beginning in 1909, creating a market for businesses selling imported machines, as well as domestic designs incorporating foreign components. Miyata produced the first all-Japanese motorcycle in 1913, also under the Asahi name, based on a British Triumph design. However, at the time motor vehicles were a luxury item and imported motorcycles were seen as fashionable and desirable over locally made machines, and the Asahi sold fewer than 40 units before production was discontinued in 1916.

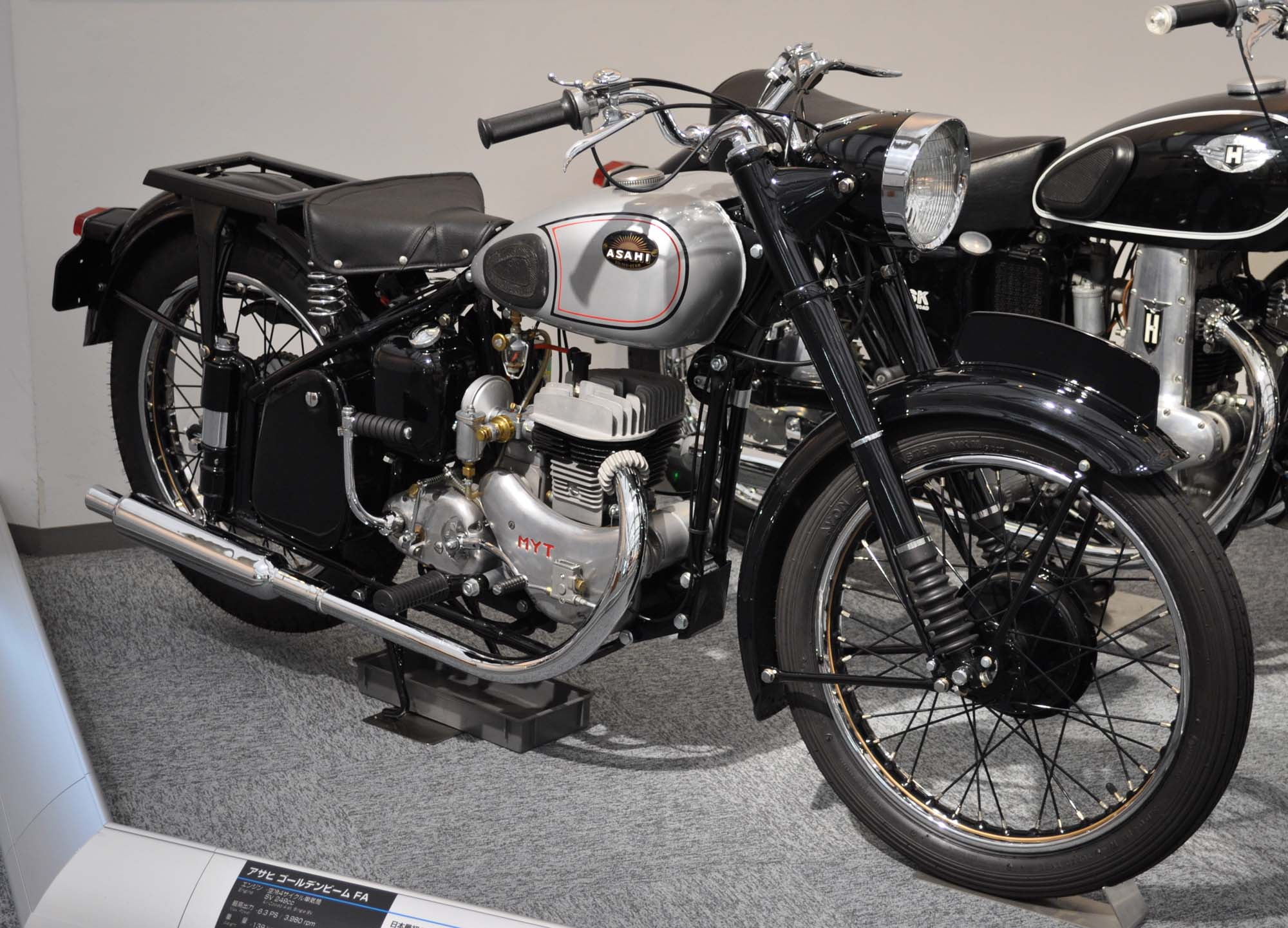
1952 Asahi Golden Beam motorcycle manufactured by Miyata

Over the next two decades, Japanese manufacturers caught up to imported brands, and the rise of motorsports and motor clubs made motorcycles more accessible to the Japanese public. Miyata returned to motorcycle production with the Asahi AA in 1933. The AA was the first mass-produced Japanese motorcycle, and was highly successful, leading to construction of a new plant at Kamata in 1938. However, after the Second Sino-Japanese War broke out in 1937 resources and materials for motorcycle construction became increasingly scarce, and in 1939 Miyata's Kamata plant was converted by the government to produce components for military aircraft. The AA sold an estimated 40,000 units from 1933-39.

Miyata again resumed production of motorcycles after the Second World War. Through the 1950s the company released the HA and the Golden Beam FA/2, both with a 249cc four-stroke motor, as well as a model with a 344cc single-cylinder motor, and various two-cylinder two-stroke motors. Miyata manufactured its last motorcycles in 1964.

== Bicycles ==
Many say Miyata pioneered triple butting, and revolutionized frame building techniques. The first Miyatas were bolt-upright town bikes. Over the decades, Miyata established a good foothold in the bicycle market, becoming contracted by multiple local brands to build their bicycles and ultimately attracting Panasonic Corporation to become a shareholder in 1959.

Panasonic Corporation, for a period the manufacturer of National and Panasonic brand bicycles, was Miyata's largest shareholder from 1959 until 2008, when it sold its remaining stake in Miyata.

=== Miyata in the U.S. ===
Throughout the U.S. bike boom of the 1970s and into the 1980s, Miyata competed with American companies including Schwinn, Huffy, and Murray; European companies including Raleigh, Peugeot and Motobecane — as well as other nascent Japanese brands including Nishiki, Fuji, Bridgestone, Centurion, Lotus and Univega — whose bikes were manufactured by Miyata. Japanese-manufactured bikes succeeded in the U.S. market until currency fluctuations in the late 1980s made them less competitive, leading companies to source bicycles from Taiwan.

=== Tubes manufacturing ===
In contrast to nearly all big bicycle manufacturers like Gazelle, Centurion, etc. which bought frame tubes from specialized manufacturers like Reynolds or Columbus, Miyata produced their own tubes. After 1981, Miyata owned its own frame tube production for steel tube drawing.

Miyata Tubing
FM-3 Magna / Hi-Magna	Often simply single-butted or made with uniform wall thickness throughout. Manganese steel was frequently used; it is heavier than CrMo but very durable.	Entry-level road bikes (RoadRunner), city models, or—very frequently—the forks of mid-range models (a combination of FM-2 frame and Hi-Manga fork).
FM-2 Hardlite / Triple Butted	Double-butted (or, less commonly, triple-butted), but with slightly thicker wall thicknesses than the FM-1. This makes it marginally heavier, yet extremely resistant to dents.	Classic touring bikes like the Traveller or road bikes like GranWinner.
FM-1 Spline Triple Butted	Triple-butted (three different wall thicknesses: thicker at the ends, extremely thin in the middle). Later versions featured internal spiral reinforcements ("Spiral Spline"), similar to Columbus SLX	Top models such as the FullPro, Pro, Gents Racer, or the expensive touring bikes (Randonneur Extra). These frames are extremely lightweight and resilient.
Aluminium 7005	High-quality aluminum featuring meticulously smoothed welds.	

=== Models ===
Late 1970s to mid-1980s Miyata bikes have high-quality Japanese lugged steel frames and Shimano or Suntour components.

Miyata models carried numeric names (e.g., Miyata 710). By the late 1970s Miyata began using the same names, writing out the numeric names (e.g., Miyata Seven Ten).

Generally, 90 and 100 series were sports/entry level bicycles. 200 and 600 series and the 1000 model were touring bicycles, with the level of bicycle increasing with first digit in the series. In general, a 200 series touring bicycle would be roughly equivalent to a 300 series competition/fitness bicycle in terms of component levels, frame materials and value. 300, 400, 500, 700, 900 series were mid-range competition/fitness bicycles — with the level of quality increasing with first digit in the series. The top line, pro series bicycles were named non-numerically (e.g., Team Miyata and Pro Miyata). 1000 series and X000 series bicycles, with the notable exception of the 1000 touring model, were competition/fitness models with non-ferrous frames.

Often (but not always) the last two digits of the model number indicated the number of available gears, e.g., 912 was a 9-series 12 speed and a 914 was a 9 series 14 speed.

- Miyata 9x: This was the bottom of the range, entry-level model. Triple butted tubing, Shimano/Suntour entry-level components.
- Miyata 1xx: Low-level model aimed at the casual consumer. Chromoly triple-butted main tubes, hi-ten stays, toe clips/straps, available in both men's and mixte styles.
- Miyata 2xx: A popular lower-end touring model. 1984 catalogue indicated the 210 used straight-gauge tubing, Dia-Compe cantilever brakes and Shimano triple drive train. By 1985, the 210 featured triple-butted chromoly tubing in the frame, with a Mangalight fork. Later models used 700 wheels; earlier models used 27" wheels. Braze-ons on front and rear dropouts (no low-rider braze-ons in front), cantis front and rear, horizontal rear dropouts, one bottle braze-on, rear rack braze-ons, and flat-top fork crown. There were also special models such as the 215ST (both traditional and mixte styles).
- Miyata 3xx: A mid-range road bike model from the "Semi-Pro" group, with Shimano 105 brakes, derailleurs, and shifters. The 105 was also shown with an arrow-like graphic. The Miyata 310/312 had a shorter wheelbase than the touring models, but with clearance for fenders and wider tires and is sometimes called a "sport-touring" model (a comfortable model for day rides and commuting). Features included double- or triple-butted Cr-Mo tubing (depending on year), 525 Crown, SR CTD handlebars, and Araya rims. Earlier models had hi-tensile steel forks, but later forks were "Mangalight" manganese alloy. Some years are equipped with an "aero-style" shifters, mounted on a single brazed-on post on top of the down tube.
- Miyata 5xx Competition (part of the "Semi-Pro" group): A higher-end road bike than the 310/312, with more "aggressive" geometry.
- Miyata 6xx: A quality touring model, one step down from the 1000, with slightly different frame geometry and lower level components. Mid-1980s 610s have triple-butted splined Chromoly frame tubing, an unusually high quality tubing and construction for its price level. This bike is slightly lighter in weight than Trek 520/720 touring bikes, but of similar quality.
- Miyata 7xx: A mid- to high-end road bike from the "Semi-Pro" group. Early models had Suntour parts, including an odd 3-wheel rear derailleur, possibly using the same frameset as the 910.
- Miyata 9xx: Miyata's high-end road bike from the "Semi-Pro" group, with Shimano 600 components.
- Miyata 1000: Touring bike with splined, triple-butted Chromo tubing. Some report the 610 to be stiffer than the 1000. 1997 model had a mix of Shimano 600 and Deore XT parts (600 DT shifters, XT derailleurs). Noted bicycle authority Sheldon Brown called the Miyata 1000 "possibly the finest off-the-shelf touring bike available at the time". The 1000 was marketed in the U.S. from the late 1970s and marketed in North America until about 1993.
- Miyata 1400: A high-end road bike sold only as a 1989 model with Shimano 600 components. It was higher-end than the 914 that was sold in the same year. Unlike the aluminum 1400A, the 1400 used Miyata's CrMo triple-butted construction.
- Miyata Cross: A top-of-the-line "cross" bikes (which included the Alumicross, Quickcross, Sportcross, Civicross, Triplecross, and Duplicross). The Alumicross was introduced in the late 1980s with standard-size aluminum main tubes bonded to steel lugs and a cromoly fork. Seat and chain stays are steel, with the seat post binder bolt holding the seat stays to the seat post lug. While the Quickcross was also a bonded aluminum frame with cromoly fork, the Sportcross, Civicross, Triplecross, were triple-butted cromoly frames and forks. The Duplicross was an oversize cromoly frame tandem bike, made only from 1991-93.
- Miyata Pro/Team/1200: These are the high-end race ready models (Team Miyata, Miyata Pro, etc.)

=== Today ===
The Miyata brand still exists and, while it is no longer distributed in the United States, it had until 2010 a joint venture with the Dutch Koga brand, a Dutch bicycle manufacturer, established in Heerenveen Netherlands, under the name Koga-Miyata. Koga is part of the Accell Group since 1998.

In late 2011, Miyata announced plans to once again sell bicycles under its own Miyata Japon brand. Its new frames were based on the Koga Miyata frame on which Peter Winnen won the Alpe d'Huez stage of the 1981 Tour de France. Each custom-ordered frame was to be hand-built and made with Miyata's traditional chromoly steel process, featuring Campagnolo components, at its Chigasaki factory.

== See also ==
- List of Japanese bicycle brands and manufacturers
- Univega
