= Univega =

American bicycle brand

Univega is a bicycle brand created during the bike boom of the 1970s by Ben Lawee (1926–2002), who founded Lawee Inc. to design, specify, and import bicycles initially manufactured in Italy by Italvega, and subsequently in Japan by Miyata.

Prior to creating the Univega brand, Lawee had been the importer of Motobécane bicycles in the U.S. and had created the Italvega in Italy. His Bertoni brand appeared after the creation of Univega.

Lawee marketed the Univega brand using the taglines "Discover the difference" and "Ride it your way" and began marketing their Alpina series of mountain bikes in the early 1980s. In 1985 Lawee moved Univega Headquarters to Signal Hill California in his new building designed by Randy Morris and Brian Corntassel of Phelps Morris Architects, Long Beach, CA. Univega now had a competitive look that would last another 11 years of success.

Univega competed in the U.S. with domestic and European bicycle manufacturers including Schwinn, Raleigh, Peugeot and Motobecane — as well as other Japanese manufacturers including Miyata, Fuji, Bridgestone, Panasonic, Nishiki, Lotus and Centurion. Bikes manufactured in Japan succeeded in the U.S. market until currency fluctuations in the late 1980s made them less competitive, which led companies to source bicycles from Taiwan.

In 1996, the parent company of Raleigh Bicycle Company, Derby Cycle, absorbed Univega along with the Nishiki brand of bicycles.

In 2018 Univega was purchased by Kent International. All Univega bicycles have since been assembled in the USA at the Bicycle Corporation of America factory in Manning, South Carolina.

== Ben Lawee ==
Ben Lawee was born in Baghdad in 1926 and emigrated to the United States on a freighter in his teens. While attending Columbia University in New York City, he worked at the bicycle shop of George Joannou, a Greek Cypriot, and subsequently moved to California as West Coast sales representative for Joannou Cycle Co.

Lawee ventured out on his own in 1959 when he purchased the Jones Bicycle shop in Long Beach, California, growing a single store into a chain. He sold the chain in 1965, began importing Bianchi bicycles, and became the national distributor for Raleigh and Motobecane. Lawee Inc. created the Italvega brand in the early 1970s, followed by the commercially successful Univega brand and the short-lived Bertoni brand. Lawee sold the Univega brand to Raleigh in 1996 and retired from the bicycle industry.

Lawee had two children, David and Monique, with his wife Ariela. He died on November 8, 2002.

== Models ==
Univega marketed road and touring bicycles and later, mountain bikes.

Activa cs millennium edition Activa 200
Activa Action
Activa Country
Activa ST
Activa Sport
Activa Trail
Alpina
Alpina Country
Alpina Pro
Alpina Sport
Alpina Team
Alpina Ultima
Alpina Uno
ArrowPace
Arrow Speed
Arrow Star

Boralyn
Carbolite
Competzione
Custom Maxima
Custom Ten
Gran Premio
Gran Rally
Gran Record
Gran Sprint
Gran Sprint – S
Gran Tech
Gran Touring
Gran Turismo
Ground Force
Ital Sport
Land Rover 12
Maxima Sport

Maxima Uno
Metro Ten
Metrothree
Metrofive
Modo Volare
Modo Vincere
Modo Vivere
Nuovo Sport
NuovoTech 450
Nuovo Ten
Nuovo Touring
Pathfinder
R7.2
RAM 970
Range Rover-ES
RENEGADE 7.0 Rover
Rover-ES
Rover Sport
Rover STI
Rover XCU

Safari
Safari Ten
Specialissima
Sportour
Superstrada
Superlight
Super Special
SupraSport
Tandem Sport
Tandem Tour
Tri-Star
Ultraleggera
Via Carisma
Via de Oro
Via Montega
Via Laser
Viva Activa 300
Viva Sport
Viva Touring
Vivatech

== Bertoni ==
Bertoni was a brand created by Ben Lawee circa-1980. The frames were manufactured in Italy by Daccordi, sometimes mistakenly assigned to Bianchi, which had no connection to the Bertoni brand other than Ben Lawee's Bianchi imports during the 1960s. Earlier Bertonis have frame details that are similar to the Torresini-made Italvegas. The 1984 and later steel frames do not bear the typical Torresini details. These "second series" frames all utilized Columbus tubesets of Matrix, SL or SLX type tubing and featured Columbus "short point" lugs and Cinelli-type Columbus bottom brackets & semi-sloping fork crowns. Seat stay lugs were Gipiemme, brazed into the contour of the rear quarters of the seat tube lug. Other braze-ons were also Gipiemme, including the two styles of brake stay bridges used, depending on the model, and the induction-cast "box arch" chainstay bridge which was common to all steel Bertonis, with the exception of the TSX model – the frame of which was obviously the Daccordi Griffe, but with Bertoni inscriptions and decals. Dropouts were forged Columbus on the lower/mid range and Campagnolo for the upscale models. The line emphasized function over flash (except for the "flash" of the 'cromovelato' – thin paint over chrome – paint jobs) and received favorable press regarding overall functionality and quality, as well as the ride/handling of the steel-frame models. The line itself was fairly large, comprising nine bicycles in 1988. The range included a disc-wheeled TT bicycle and a Bador (Vitus) aluminum model.

== Models ==
"Second Series"(incomplete list):

- Nuovitalia – base model with Columbus Matrix double-butted tubesets and a mix of Ofmega and Shimano components.
- Corsa Mondiale – Mid-range steel-frame (Columbus SL; Matrix used on tall frames) model equipped with Shimano 600 crankset, hubs, derailleurs and brakes.
- Specialissima – uprange steel model with Columbus SLX tubing and Shimano Dura-Ace hubs, crank, derailleurs and brakes.
- Professionale – similar SLX frame with Campagnolo SR componentry.
- TSX – Columbus TSX tubing, Daccordi Griffe type "webbed" lugs and bottom bracket shell.

== Italvega ==
Italvega bikes were designed and hand-built within the noted Torresini workshop at the Torpado factory in Padua, Italy. They were built beginning in 1970 and continuing through the mid- to late-70s before manufacturing was moved to Japan under the name Univega. All Italvega bicycles were made in the Torpado factory, but not all were high-end bicycles. Torpado made a broad variety of bicycles for different uses (including worker, comfort, BMT, ATB, and even motorized)

== Top-end models ==
Models manufactured under the Italvega marque include (in order of increasing quality):

- Viva Sport
- Nuovo Sport
- Nuovo Record
- Super Record
- Super Speciale
- Super Light
- Viva Touring

The top-end models were built with double-butted Columbus tubing and Campagnolo Record and Nuovo Record components. The low- to mid-tier framesets have the inverted triangle Columbus foil decal, while the better models have the rectangle Columbus foil decal. Models in the lowest tier have no Columbus decal.

== See also ==
- List of Japanese bicycle manufacturers
