= Panasonic Sport Deluxe =

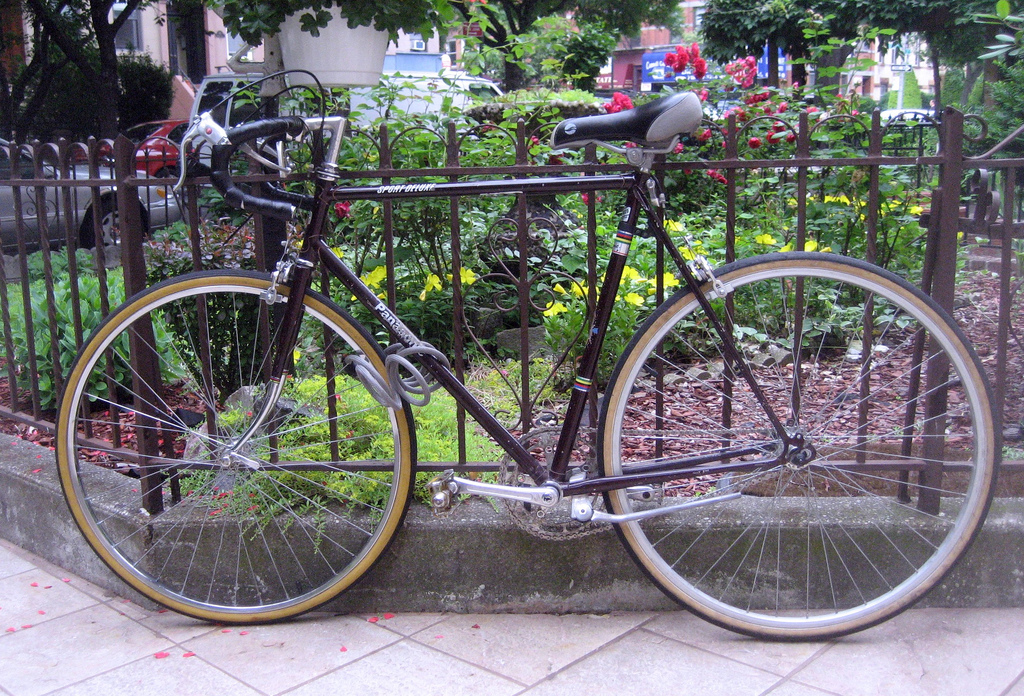

The Panasonic Sport Deluxe is a road sport bicycle by National (later, Panasonic), which was exported to the United States from 1971 to 1989. Originally built in Osaka, Japan, later bikes may be either of Japanese or Taiwanese origin.

The Panasonic Sport Deluxe utilized Suntour and Shimano group parts such as derailleurs, shifters, and crankset. The Sport Deluxe frame was originally built out of double-butted 1020 high-tensile steel, though bikes produced in later years may have frames of butted chrome molybdenum steel alloy.

All production of Panasonic bicycles for the U.S. market ended in September 1989, following the death of National/Panasonic's founder, Konosuke Matsushita. Many Sport Deluxe bikes are still being used today in Japan and the USA.

== See also ==
Panasonic (bicycles)
