= Mondia (bicycle company) =

Swiss bicycle brand

- Company type: Private
- Industry: Bicycles
- Headquarters: Switzerland
- Products: Bicycle and related components
- Revenue: Private company - undisclosed

Mondia was one of the most successful Swiss bicycle brands.

== History ==
Mondia bicycles were manufactured by Jeker-Häfeli & Cie, which started production in 1933. In 1936, Jeker-Häfeli sponsored a Mondia racing team for the Tour of Switzerland race. The winner that year was a Mondia rider.

Mondia went out of production in 2003. Bicycle manufacturer Mondia Fahrrad AG. a Swiss company, is not related to the original Mondia.

== Bike frames ==
Mondia bicycle frames from the 1970s are said to rival modern frames in terms of weight and engineering. The typical service weight, with premium quality components, was under 10.5 kilos (23 lbs.) Mondia frames from 1960's - 1980's were known for their "wild" multi-color paint jobs. Mondia bicycles were easily recognized by a distinctive fade paint scheme which gradually blended color onto the chrome ends of the front fork and stays. The headbadge had "Super Mondia" stamped over a stylized sunburst array.

During the 1960s and 1970s Mondia produced three premium frames: a criterium model, a touring model and a cyclo-cross model.

The Mondia "Special" touring frame featured a front fork with a pronounced curve and a slightly greater rake that was described as having a very comfortable ride, though described by some as noodly. The Special also featured ornate Nervex chrome frame lugs. Brazed-on brake cable sheath stops were mounted along the lower right side of the top tube. Another fixture on the Special were brazed-on attachments to mount front and rear racks for cross-country touring gear.

The Mondia "Super" racing frame was somewhat tighter and stiffer, and with a straighter front fork. Mondia Super frames used the less elaborate Prugnat chrome lugs with distinctive center cut-outs. Brazed-on guides for brake cables on this model were centered along the top of the top tube.

Both frames were constructed of Reynolds 531 steel tubing (in French metric sizes), typical of the high-end bicycle during this era of manufacture. The front forks of later Mondia frames featured Bocama semi-sloping chrome-plated investment cast fork crowns with Mondia stamped into the shoulders on each side. Bottom brackets were either Swiss- or French-threaded, while headsets featured French threads and steerer bore. Although individual bicycles were built up with a great variety of components, the most common premium groupset was the Campagnolo "Nuovo Record" with "Mafac" brakesets.

Mondia manufactured at least two other, less common cyclo-cross and criterium frames. One, known as the "Criterium" was available in the early 1970s; the second model, designed for criterium racing and called the "Criterium Prestige" was manufactured for about two years in the late 1970s. The Prestige appeared to combine selected design and technical features of the Mondia Super and Special. The cyclo-cross model featured the trademark fade paint and cantilever center pull brakes mounted on studs brazed to the stays and fork of a Reynolds 531 frame.
