= Panasonic Cycle Technology =

Japanese bicycle company

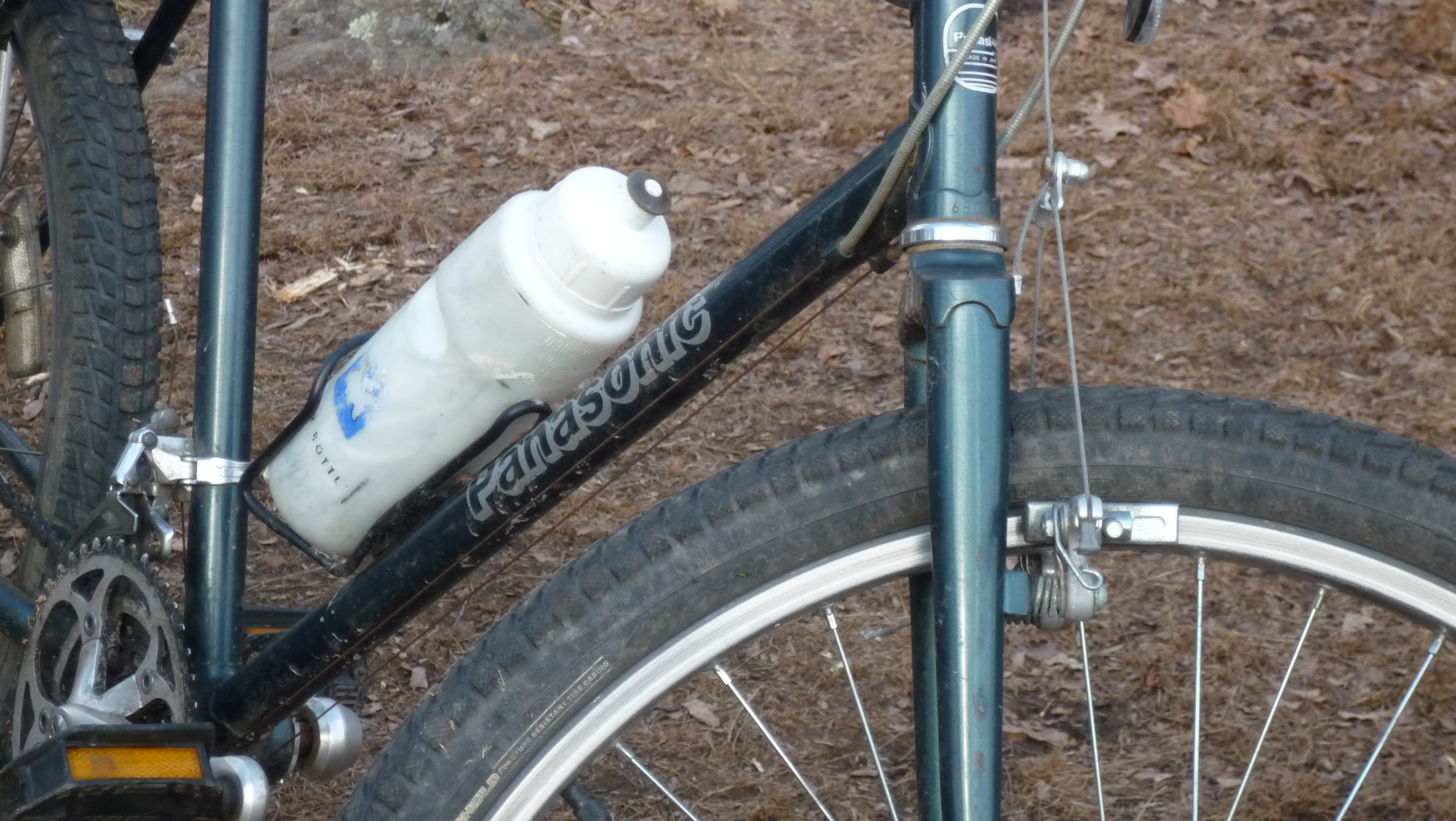
Panasonic mountain bike from the late 80s

Panasonic Cycle Technology Co., Ltd. (パナソニック サイクルテック株式会社, Panasonikku Saikuru Tekku Kabushiki-gaisha), formerly Nashonaru Jitensha Kōgyō (ナショナル自転車工業株式会社; "National Cycle Industries"), is a producer of bicycles and cycling accessories.

== History ==
The "Panasonic" brand was (together with the "National" brand) used by Matsushita Electric Industrial Company for bicycles long before Matsushita changed its name to Panasonic. Konosuke Matsushita grew up with a family who owned a bicycle shop and always had a love and passion for bicycles. He later on founded the Panasonic bicycle line. Panasonic bicycles were very well built, and produced in steel, aluminum and titanium. Some of the road models were used in the Tour de France.

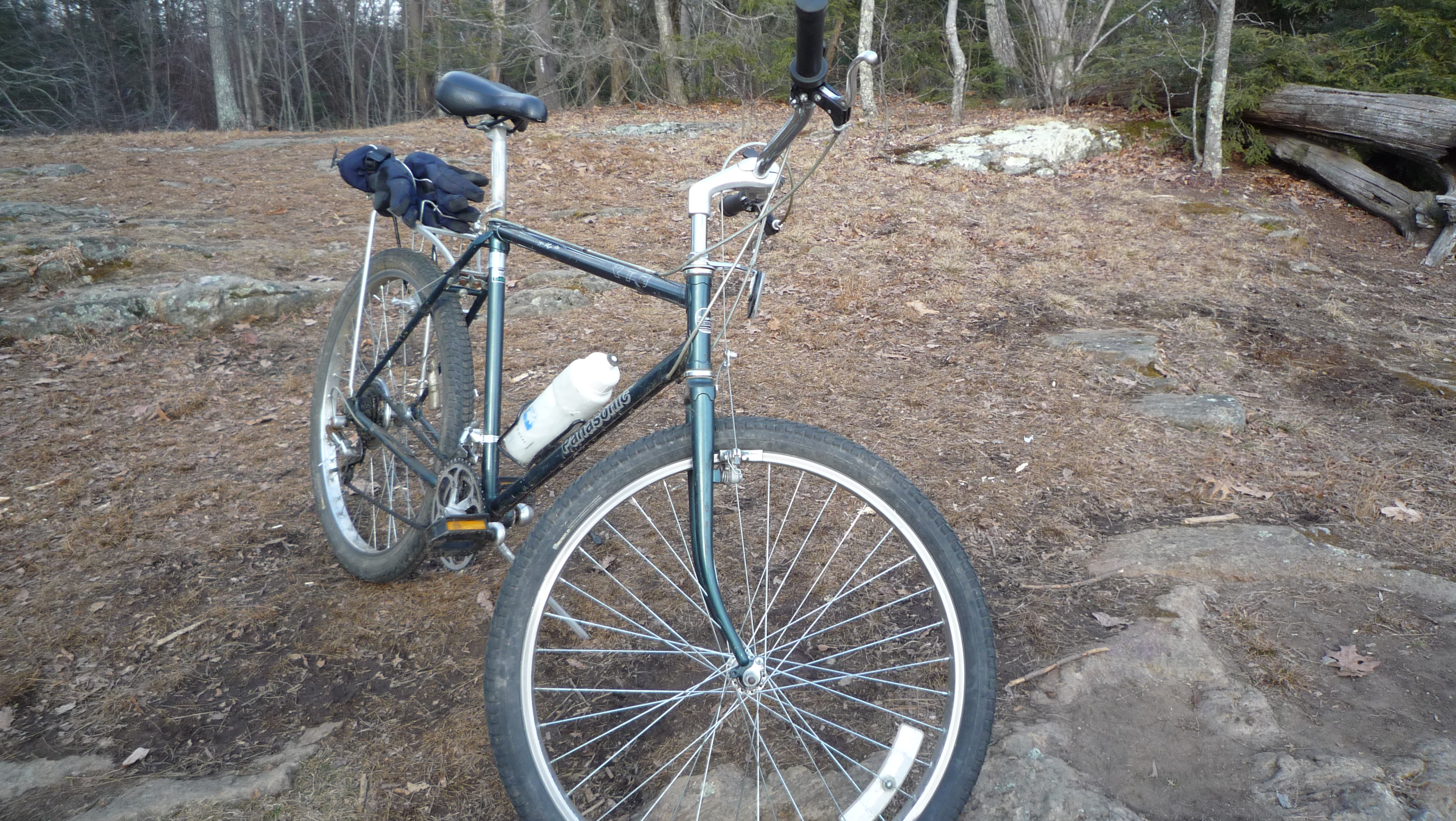
Panasonic mountain bike

Timetrialbike used by Viatcheslav Ekimov in 1992.

Panasonic has competed with bicycle companies like Miyata, Bridgestone, Maruishi, Nichibei Fuji, and Motobécane. The types of bicycles Panasonic produced ranged from mamachari, commuter, road, touring, to track racing models. According to the Panasonic Bike Museum, other bicycle producers sold rebadged Panasonic bicycles at various times such as Royce Union, Schwinn and Raleigh.

== See also ==
Panasonic Sport Deluxe
