= Italvega =

Road bicycles brand

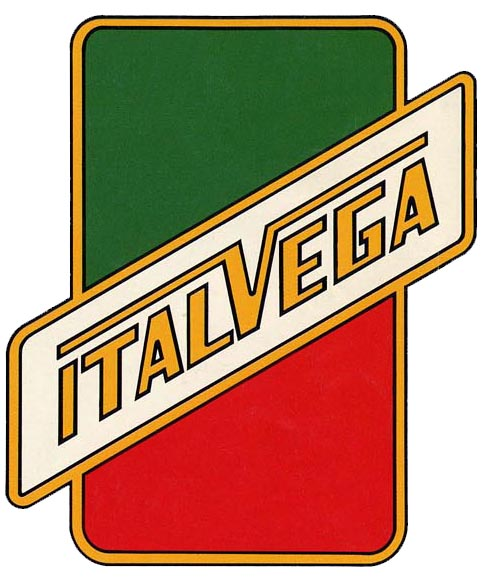
- Italvega logo head badge
- Type: Private
- Industry: Bicycle production
- Founded: 1970; 56 years ago
- Founder: Ben Lawee
- Defunct: 1977; 49 years ago, restart 2016; 10 years ago
- Fate: Production moved to Japan under new name
- Headquarters: Alphen aan den Rijn, Netherlands
- Area served: World
- Products: Viva Sport; Nuovo Sport; Nuovo Record; Super Record; Super Speciale; Super Light
- Owner: Nicholas Hurenkamp

Italvega is a brand of road bicycles designed, specified, imported and marketed by the California-based bicycle distributor, Lawee, Inc., founded by Ben Lawee, who also created the Univega and Bertoni bicycle brands.

Italvega bikes were designed and hand-built within the noted Torresini workshop at the Torpado factory in Padua, Italy. They were built beginning in 1970 and continuing through the mid- to late-1970s before manufacturing was moved to Japan under the name Univega. All Italvega bicycles were made in the Torpado factory, but not all were high-end bicycles. Torpado made a broad variety of bicycles for different uses (including worker, comfort, BMT, ATB, and even motorized).

== Ben Lawee ==
Ben Lawee, born in Baghdad, Iraq, immigrated to the U.S. at age 19. Lawee attended business school at Columbia University, and in 1959 purchased Jones Bicycles, growing the single store into a multi-store chain. He sold the retail chain in 1965 to begin importing Bianchi and Legnano bikes, and became the national distributor for Raleigh and Motobécane. Lawee, who had two children, David and Monique, with his wife Ariela, died November 8, 2002.

== Models ==
Models manufactured under the Italvega marque include (in order of increasing quality):

- Viva Sport
- Nuovo Sport
- Nuovo Record
- Super Record
- Super Speciale
- Super Light

The top-end models were built with double-butted Columbus tubing and Campagnolo Record and Nuovo Record components. The low-mid level framesets have the inverted triangle Columbus foil decal, while the better models have the rectangle Columbus foil decal. The lowest models have no Columbus decal.

== 2017 Restart ==
In 2017, the brand was re-registered in the Netherlands by Nicholas Hurenkamp, who is seeking to fund a production facility in March 2018 through crowdfunding. The new brand markets two models - the Super Speciale and the Nuovo Supersport, both of which are completely hand painted.
