= Merida Bikes =

Taiwanese bicycle manufacturing company

Merida Industry Co., Ltd.
- Company type: Public
- Traded as: TWSE: 9914
- Industry: Bicycle manufacturing
- Founded: 1972; 54 years ago
- Headquarters: Yuanlin, Changhua, Taiwan
- Area served: Asia; Europe; Australia; New Zealand; Mexico; Central America
- Key people: Michael Tseng, CEO
- Products: Bicycles and related components
- Revenue: 29,391,183,000 New Taiwan dollar (2021)
- Operating income: 1,589,376,000 New Taiwan dollar (2021)
- Net income: 4,788,170,000 New Taiwan dollar (2021)
- Total assets: 35,508,949,000 New Taiwan dollar (2021)
- Website: merida-bikes.com

Merida Industry Co., Ltd (MIC; Chinese: 美利達工業) is a Taiwan-based company with R&D headquarters in Germany that designs, manufactures, and markets bicycles globally in over 77 countries. Founded in 1972 by Ike Tseng (1932–2012), the company designs and manufactures over two million bicycles a year at its factories in Taiwan, China, and Germany. After Tseng's death in January 2012, his son Michael Tseng became the company's president.

After making bicycles as an original equipment manufacturer for numerous other brands, the company established its own brand, Merida, in 1988. The company currently designs and manufactures bicycles primarily for its own brand—and for brands with which it shares financial interest, including the now German brand Centurion.

Merida has been a publicly traded company on the Taiwanese stock exchange since 1992 and is valued as of 2012 at approximately £350 million, making it one of Taiwan's largest companies.

The name Merida derives roughly from the translation of its three syllables měi-lì-dá, which mirror the company's goal to manufacture bikes that enable the customer to reach their destination.

== History ==
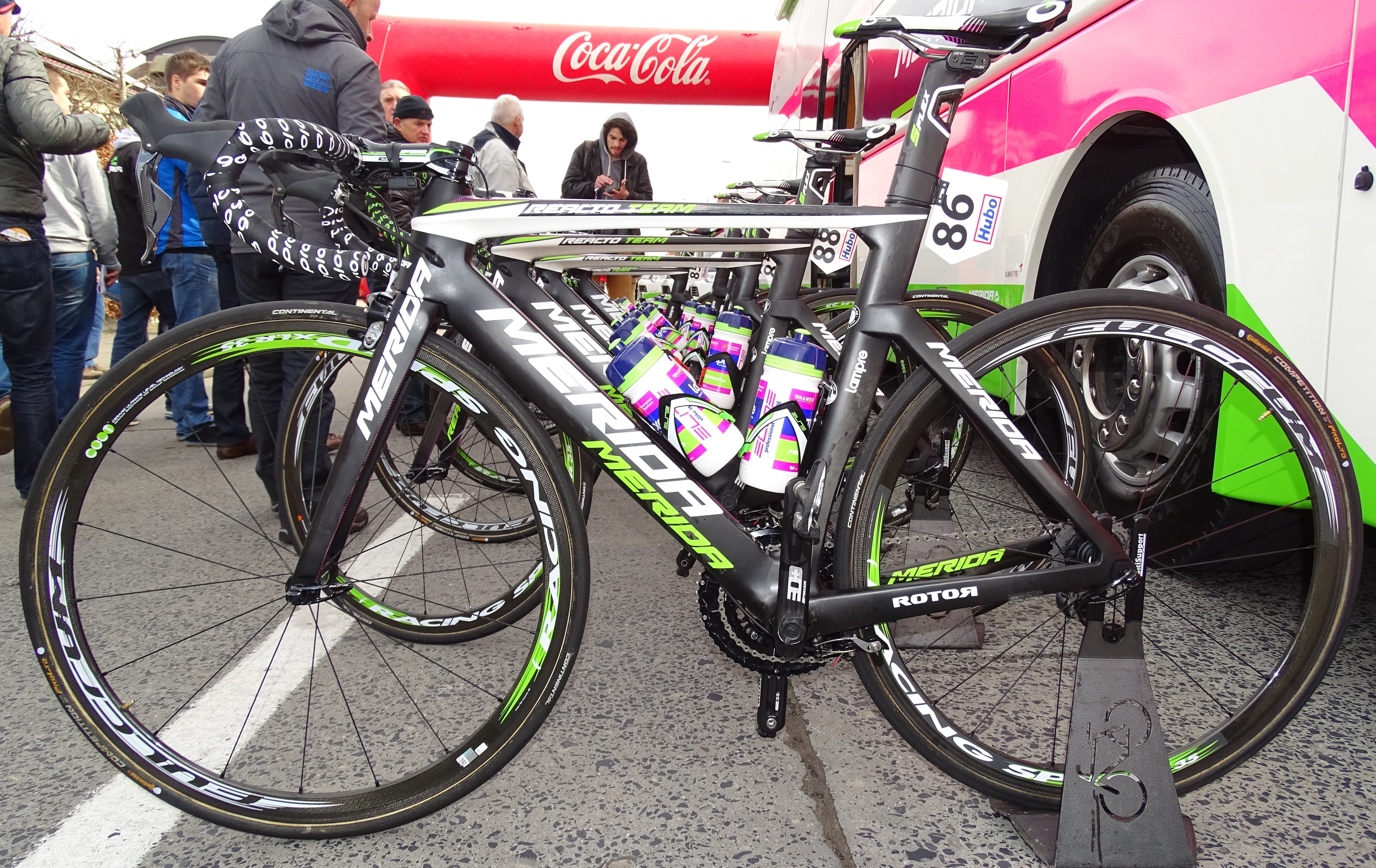
Merida Reacto Team

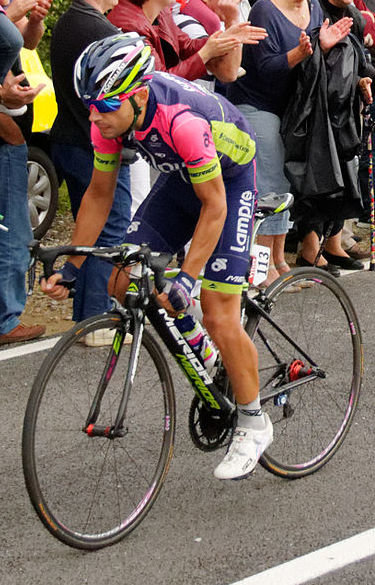
Kristijan Đurasek at Tour de France in 2014

The original Merida factory was organized after the Raleigh Nottingham factory as the company began by making Raleigh bikes for the North American market. Tseng would later develop his own welding robots to meet his production goals.

In 2001, Merida bought 49% of Specialized for a reported US$30 million, with its CEO and founder Mike Sinyard remaining the majority owner. In the past, Merida manufactured bicycles for companies including Mongoose. In 2007, Merida invested $7 million to renovate its 35-year-old factory in Taichung, without halting production.

== Sponsorship ==
Merida has been co-sponsor of the Multivan Merida Biking Team, with athletes such as José Antonio Hermida and Gunn-Rita Dahle Flesjå, and of bicycle racing events such as the TransUK and TransWales mountain bike races. Since 2004, the team has been scoring over 30 World Cup wins as well as Olympic gold and silver medals.

In 2013 Merida became co-sponsors of the Pro-Tour Lampre-Merida road racing team and changed to Bahrain–Merida Pro Cycling Team in 2017, which is called Team Bahrain Victorious since 2021.

== See also ==
- List of companies of Taiwan
- Rebranding
- Original design manufacturer (ODM)
