= Cat's Eye (cocktail) =

Classic gin cocktail

- Type: Mixed drink
- Ingredients: 2 glasses gin; 1/2 glass lemonade; 1/2 glass water; 1/2 glass cointreau; Almost 2 glasses vermouth; 1 spoonful Kirsch
- Standard drinkware: Cocktail glass
- Standard garnish: Olive
- Preparation: Combine ingredients with ice in cocktail shaker; shake well, then strain into cocktail glass, pouring over ice.

The Cat's Eye is a classic gin-based cocktail that appears in The Savoy Cocktail Book. It's made with lemonade, cointreau, vermouth and a splash of kirsch. The original recipe is intended for a 6 person batch. Another version of the drink is made with gin, vermouth and chartreuse, garnished with orange peel.

The name has come to be used for unrelated cocktails such as one made with pisco, passion fruit purée and orange juice. Another version, described as "one of the holy grails of contemporary bartending", replaced the pisco with tequila.
