= Kuwahara (bicycle company) =

Japanese bicycle company

Kuwahara Company
- Native name: Japanese: 桑原商会
- Romanized name: Kuwahara Shōkai
- Industry: Bicycle manufacturing
- Founded: 1918
- Founder: Sentaro Kuwahara
- Headquarters: Osaka, Japan
- Area served: Japan; North America; Europe; Australia

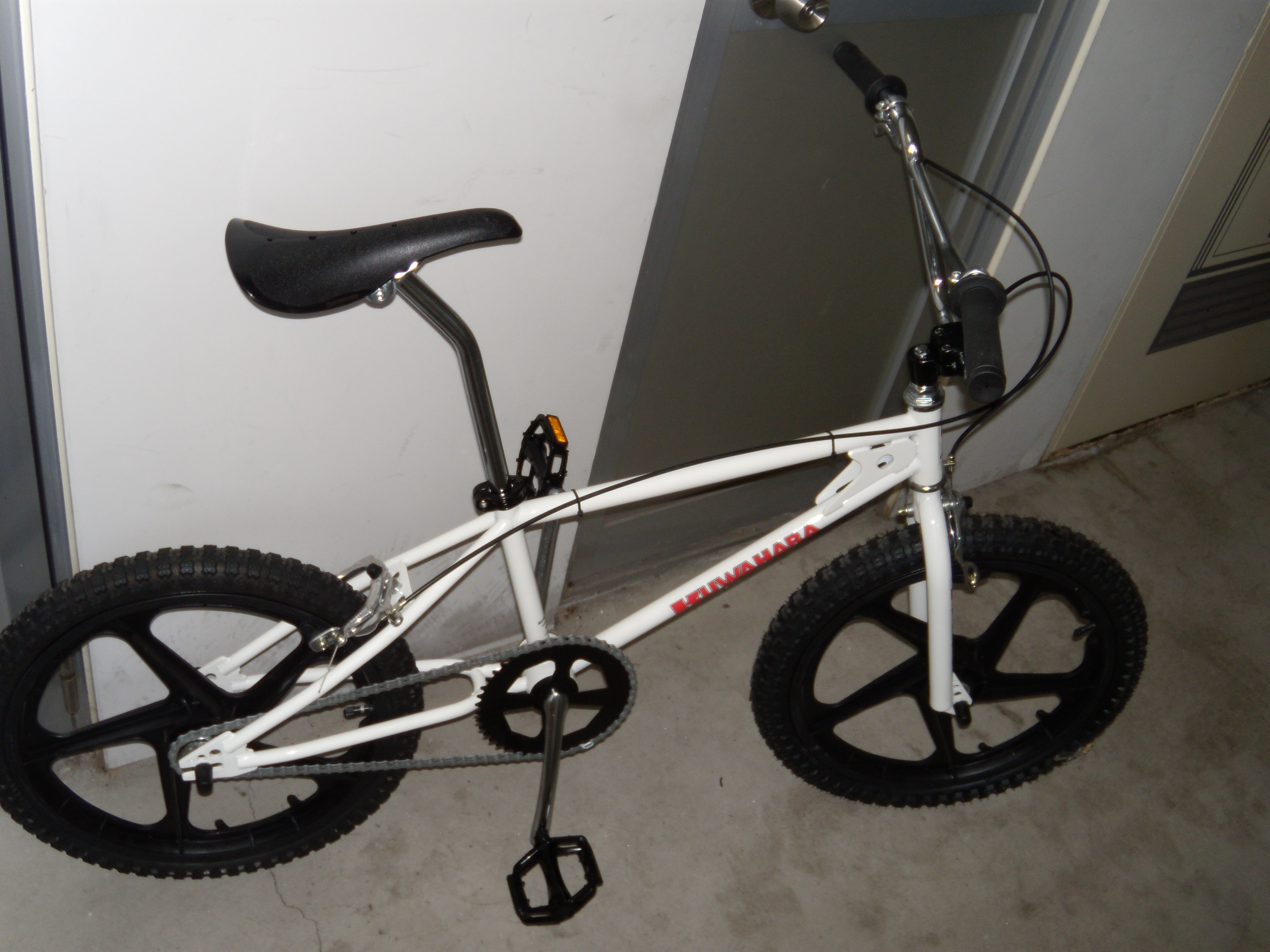
A white Kuwahara brand BMX bike.

Kuwahara Company (桑原商会, Kuwahara Shōkai) is a Japanese bicycle company manufacturing both bicycles and parts.

The company was started as a small family business in Osaka, Japan in 1918 by Sentarō Kuwahara (桑原仙太郎). With his wife and eight children, he began a local bicycle parts wholesale. In 1925, Kuwahara began to export bicycles and parts to Russia, China and Southeast Asia, closing the business from 1940 to 1945 during World War II. 1959 saw the first delivery of Kuwahara bikes to the USA. Sentaro Kuwahara died the following year, with his son Masao taking his place.

In 1962, Kuwahara sent its first shipment of Apollo brand sport bicycles to Canada and, in 1968, began exporting private label bikes to the US for other companies such as Schwinn, Takara, Puch, and Azuki.

The first Kuwahara branded bikes for export came in 1972 when it began developing BMX bicycles for the North American, European and Australian markets.

Howie Cohen — who had previously operated West Coast Cycle, importer of Nishiki bikes — founded the company Everything Bicycles, and worked with Kuwahara to build and import BMX bikes carrying the "Kuwahara" brand name, developing the first major BMX distributorship.

To make the Kuwahara brand name a household word, Cohen ran a promotion giving free stickers to children who called a toll-free phone number and could correctly pronounce the brand name. In 1989, Cohen sold the Kuwahara name back to the Japanese parent company.

The Kuwahara brand gained international recognition and popularity when its BMX model was used in E.T. the Extra-Terrestrial. Following the success of the film, Kuwahara began producing red and white "ET" models in three price and quality levels. Kuwahara reissued the ET model in 2002, as part of ET's 20th anniversary, and again in 2022 as part of the film's 40th anniversary. In 2007, lead singer Tom Meighan of rock group Kasabian purchased the screen used bike for £10,000.

Takuo Kuwahara started Kuwahara International in 1988.

== Models ==
Kuwahara made number of all-terrain/mountain bikes. These bikes were released in sizes referred to based on their frame size (small, medium, large, extra large).

- Butte: 1987
- Shasta:
- Cascade:
- M3.5 ParkWay
- M3.6 ParkWay
- Lynx: 1990, 1991, 1992,
- Cheetah: 1990, 1991,
- Ranger: 1989,
- Lion: 1989, 1990, 1991
- Cougar: 1989, 1990, 1991,
- Puma: 1989
- Panther: 1989
- Jaguar: 1989
- Tiger: 1990, 1991,
- Leopard: 1990,
- Gepard: 1990,
- A-Pacer: 1992,
- C-Pacer: 1991, 1992,
- U-Pacer: 1992,
- X-Pacer: 1990, 1991, 1992
- Hi-Pacer: 1989, 1990, 1991, 1992,
- Pacer: 1989, 1990, 1991, 1992,
- Oncilla: 1991, 1992,
- Maragay: 1991, 1992,
- Carbo-Titan: 1991,1992
- Marten: 1992,
- Badger: 1992,
- Weasel: 1992,
- Mountain Tandem: 1989, 1990, 1991, 1992
- Road Tandem: 1989, 1990, 1991, 1992
- Kuwahara Thread, MTBR https://www.mtbr.com/threads/classic-kuwahara-mtbs.513225/
- Kuwahara 1989 Catalogue http://kuwahara-family.brieger.blog/wp-content/uploads/2019/03/Kuwahara-1989.pdf
- Kuwahara 1990 Catalogue https://www.retrobike.co.uk/gallery2/d/12520-2/Kuwahara90.pdf
- Kuwahara 1991 Catalogue https://www.retrobike.co.uk/gallery2/d/12526-2/Kuwahara91.pdf
- Kuwahara 1992 Catalogue https://www.retrobike.co.uk/gallery2/d/12530-2/Kuwahara92.pdf
