= Sugino =

Japanese bicycle component manufacturer

Sugino Engineering Corporation
- Native name: 株式会社スギノエンジニアリング
- Type: Private KK
- Industry: Leisure products
- Founded: (1910; 116 years ago)
- Headquarters: Nara City, Nara Prefecture 630-8144, Japan
- Products: Cycling components including: Chainrings; Cranksets
- Website: Official website

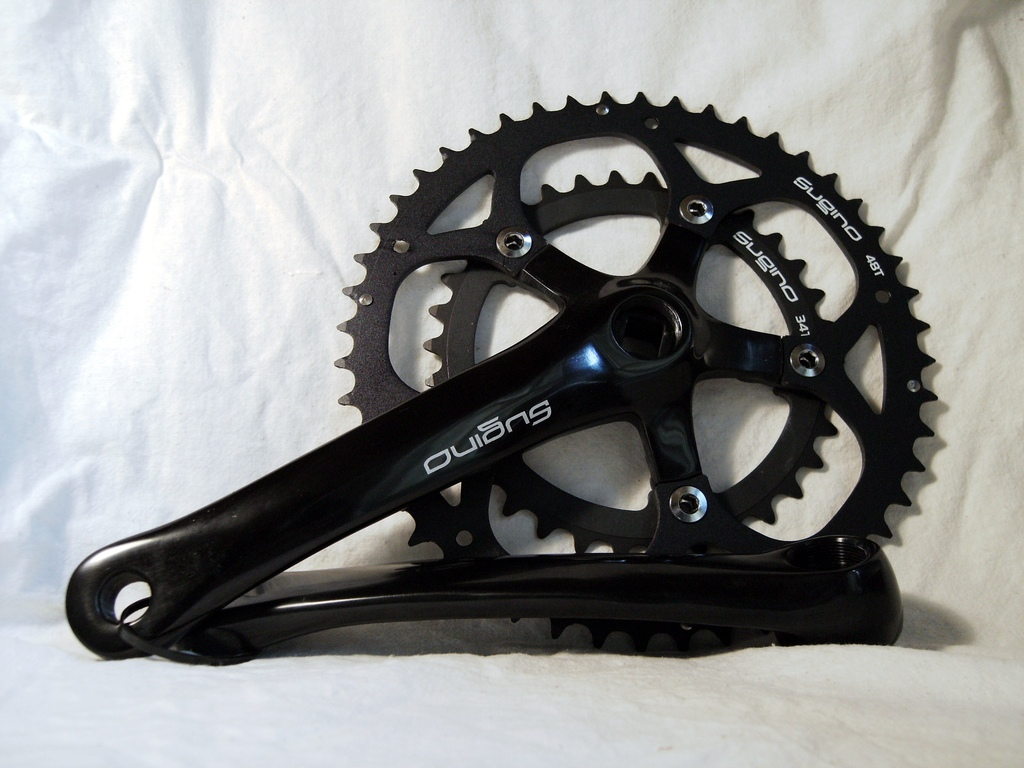
A Sugino XD crankset

Sugino (株式会社スギノエンジニアリング, Kabushiki-gaisha Sugino Enjiniaringu) is a Japanese manufacturer of road and track bicycle components, founded in Nara, Japan, in 1910. It made a variety of cycling components, including cranksets and chainrings. After flagging in popularity due to Shimano's increased dominance of the Japanese bicycle component industry in the 1990s, the company has recently become more prominent, due to the rising popularity of fixed-gear bicycles and the cachet associated with the "Sugino 75" track racing equipment.
