= CatEye =

Japanese manufacturer of bicycle accessories

CATEYE Co., Ltd.
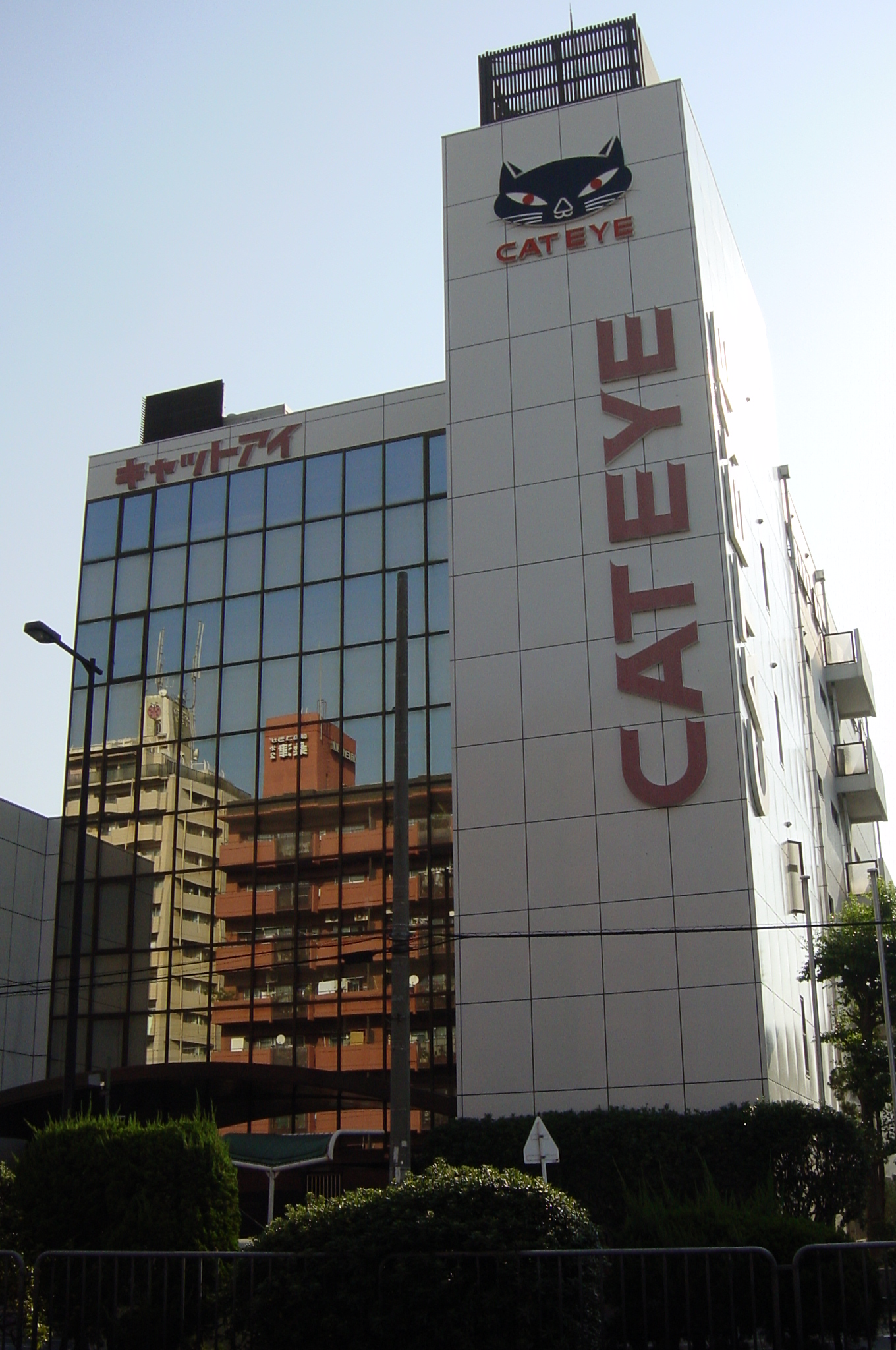
- CATEYE headquarters
- Native name: 株式会社キャットアイ
- Company type: Private KK
- Industry: Bicycle Lights & Computers
- Founded: Osaka, Japan (February 16, 1954; 72 years ago)
- Headquarters: Higashisumiyoshi-ku, Osaka 546-0041, Japan
- Number of locations: 2 factories (as of 2025)
- Area served: Worldwide
- Key people: Masahiro Araki (President)
- Products: Computer; Headlights; Taillights; Reflectors; Mirrors
- Number of employees: 224 (as of June 3, 2023)
- Website: cateye.com/intl/cateyeamerica.com

Japanese manufacturer of bicycle accessories

CATEYE Co., Ltd. (株式会社キャットアイ, Kabushiki-gaisha Kyattoai), better known by its brand name CATEYE, is a Japanese company. It is a manufacturer of cycling computers, lights and reflectors to cyclists worldwide . The company was founded in 1954 in Osaka, Japan and developed the first flashing bicycle light in 1964, and it released its first cycle computer in 1981. CATEYE was among the first companies to integrate altimeter, heart rate, and cadence technology into cycle computers, and created the very first bicycle head lamp using white LEDs in 2001.

As of 2023 it employs 224 people. While the company's head office and design teams are in Japan, today many components are manufactured in its Chinese factory and subsidiaries.
