= Mafac =

French manufacturer of bicycle brakes

MAFAC, or Manufacture Arvernoise de Freins et Accessoires pour Cycles (Arverni Manufacturing Works for Bicycle Brakes and Accessories), was a French manufacturer of bicycle brakes and tool kits. MAFAC was founded in post-war France under the name "Securité", which changed to MAFAC in the autumn of 1947. Initially MAFAC made cantilever brakes, brake levers, and tool kits. Early MAFAC brakes were built in the cantilever configuration with a separate brake arm on each side, actuated by a straddle cable. Later MAFAC brakes were of a center-pull design in which a straddle cable links the two overlapping arms of the brake. Like the cantilever design, it is actuated by pulling from the center of this cable. MAFAC's rubber brake hoods, originating in the late 1940s, had built-in adjusters, allowing adjustment of the brakes while riding. The center-pull brakes were designed to clear fenders, front rack mounts, handlebar bags, and large tires. This made MAFAC brakes one of the most popular models from the late 1950s through the 1970s.

The ability to clear larger tires also led to MAFAC cantilever brakes appearing on some of the earliest mountain bikes, including one of the first package-built mountain bikes, the 1981 Specialized Stumpjumper.

The center-pulls were solid brakes and inexpensive which led to MAFAC brakes being specified on everything from inexpensive to competition level bikes. Economic pressures and strong competition from Japan led to the company's disappearance in the late 1980s.

== Brakes ==
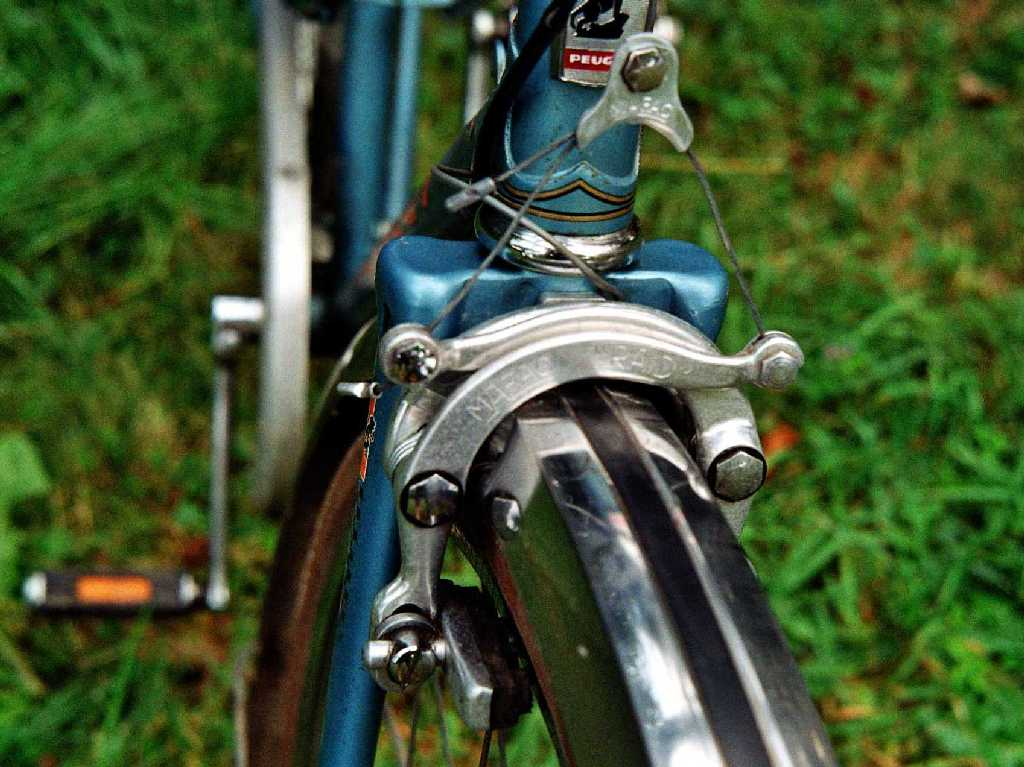
Raid model

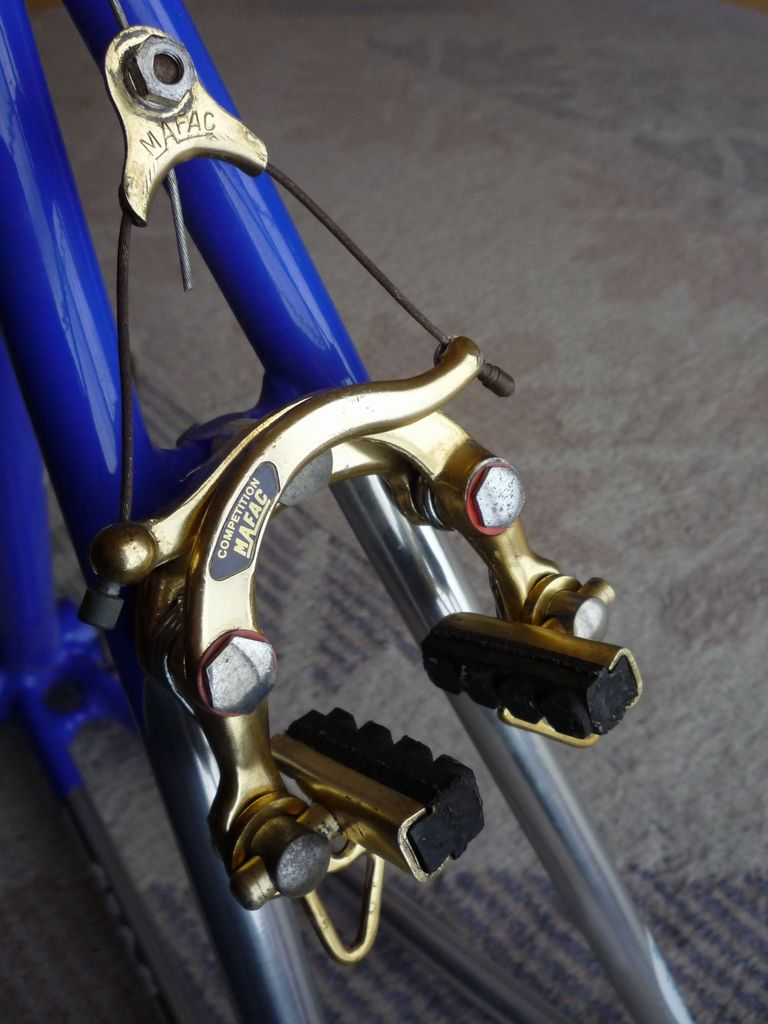
Competition model

Early models included several cantilevers (in production at least until the early 1980s) and the early center-pull (marked Dural Forge). Cantilevers included:

- Kathy
- Driver
- Criterium

MAFAC, however, is best known for later center-pull brakes, including:

- Tiger
- Racer
- Raid
- Competition

All of the center-pull brakes followed the same basic design with minimal changes. The Competition model were a later high-end brake and used a different cross-cable than the other models. They also had brass bushings pressed into the arms in place of the plastic used on less expensive models. Other materials were substantially similar and finish qualities were equivalent. Early MAFAC brakes were produced in much lower numbers and are therefore less common while the Racer was MAFAC's highest volume brake product.

Levers evolved over time from being all aluminum with non-drilled lever arms to using resin bodies and drilled lever arms in some later models. Two varieties of hoods were supplied: half-hoods covering only the top of the lever assembly, or full-hoods covering the entire body of the lever assembly. Both included the built-in adjusters that allowed riders to adjust brake clearance while riding. MAFAC also supplied rubber lever arm covers as an option.

City bike levers were supplied with plastic lever arms.

MAFAC produced side-pull brakes in the late 1970s and early 1980s, concurrently with their cantilever and center-pull offerings. The first of these was the angular LS model, later followed by the Campagnolo Nuovo Record-like LS2. LS2 models were also produced under the branding Spidel in association with other French manufacturers who had assembled a common group set to compete with Campagnolo and SunTour. The LS/LS2 were the top-of-the-line MAFAC side-pull but a mid-range brake set called LC was offered in side-pull configuration as well.

== Tool kits ==
MAFAC sold tool kits for general repair while riding, but the kits specifically included all of the tools to work on MAFAC brakes. They were sold in a plastic folder-type bag which could be hung from the back of bicycle saddles.

Models included:

- The Constructor: six tools
- Touriste: seven tools
- Randonneur: ten tools
