= Cycles Peugeot =

Bicycle manufacturer

- Type: Subsidiary
- Industry: Bicycle
- Founded: 1882; 144 years ago in Beaulieu, a suburb of Mandeure
- Founder: Armand Peugeot
- Headquarters: Sochaux, France
- Area served: Worldwide
- Products: Bicycles
- Parent: Cycleurope
- Website: cycles.peugeot.com

Cycles Peugeot, founded in 1882, is a manufacturer of bicycles based in Sochaux, France and currently a part of Cycleurope, a subsidiary of Sweden-based firm Grimaldi Industri.

== History ==
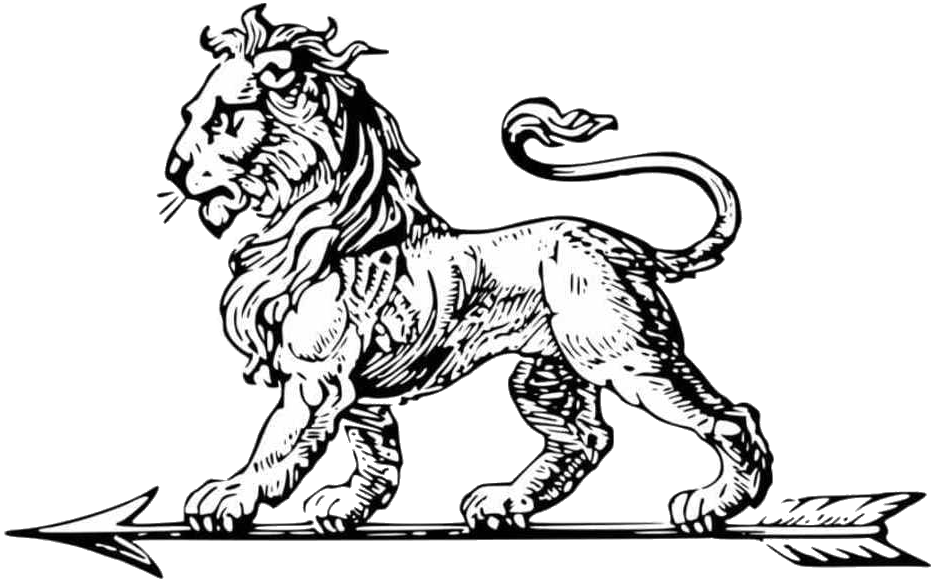
The lion walking on an arrow was the first logo of Peugeot in 1810

Peugeot is a French manufacturer founded by Jean Pequignot Peugeot, a 19th-century manufacturer of water mills. Using the mills' profits, Peugeot expanded with a steelworks in Montbéliard, which Jean Peugeot ran with a colleague and his two brothers. The company's trademark, a lion, was created in 1858 by an engraver, Justin Blazer, who lived near the factory. The company turned their steel into knives and forks, hydraulic equipment and, from 1882, bicycles, sold as Cycles Peugeot. In Beaulieu-sur-Doubs (in Mandeure, Doubs) that year, the first Peugeot bicycle, a penny-farthing called Le Grand Bi, was hand-built by Armand Peugeot.

During the First World War, Peugeot factories manufactured trucks, shells, bicycles, and even invalid strollers, as well as ammunition for heavy artillery.

In 1926, the auto and bicycle manufacturing divisions at Peugeot were divided. Automobiles were constructed at Automobiles Peugeot, while bicycles were made at Cycles Peugeot. In 1930, bicycle production reached 162,000 units per year at the Beaulieu factory.

By 1955, the factory at Beaulieu was turning out 220,000 bicycles a year, employing nearly 3,500 workers, while Automobiles Peugeot completed its 100,000th automobile. During the 1950s, European interest in cycling as a means of transportation virtually disappeared, and by 1956, bicycle production at Cycles Peugeot was cut in half.

In 1958, Peugeot diversified into manufacturing components for the auto industry to augment declining sales of bicycles. As consumer interest in bicycling returned in the 1960s, Peugeot gradually increased its production of sport, racing, and touring road bicycles.

=== Racing heritage ===
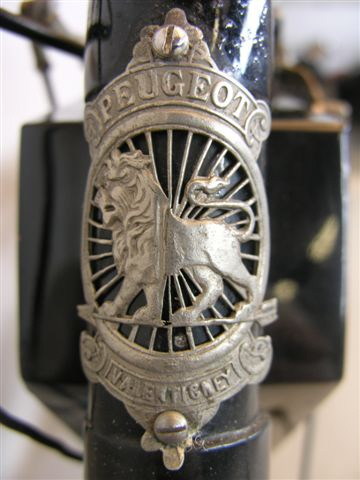
The lion emblem on a bicycle frame

Early on, the Peugeot family saw the value of publicity in sponsoring racing cyclists. Paul Bourillon became the world sprint champion in Copenhagen in 1896 on a Peugeot bicycle. The family also backed riders in numerous road races and in 1905 sponsored its first Tour de France winner, Louis Trousselier.

After the first Tour de France win, the Peugeot cycling team remained active in the Tour and other European cycle races. Peugeot would go on to become the most successful factory team of all time in the Tour de France, winning the race a record ten times. Like some other large European bicycle manufacturers, Peugeot was not above purchasing handcrafted team racing bicycles, fabricated by small independent craftsmen such as Masi, which were then painted and outfitted to resemble standard Peugeot factory production models.

Peugeot and rival marque Mercier were among the last bicycle factories to continue team sponsorship. Rising costs had forced other brands to surrender control of their teams to backers from outside the bicycle industry. Even as most other teams were using Italian Campagnolo components, Peugeot continued to use French ones. Stronglight cranksets, Simplex derailleurs, and Mafac brakes were standard. The last yellow jersey worn by a Peugeot factory rider was in 1983, when Pascal Simon took the lead in the Tour de France until he was forced to drop out due to injury.

By the time of the 1986 racing season, costs in a period of inflation triggered by an oil crisis meant Peugeot's entire racing budget of 1.06 million francs ran out before the season had ended. William Desazar de Montgaillard, director-general of Peugeot, announced that due to lack of financial support, there would no longer be a fully sponsored Peugeot team.

=== Production bicycles ===
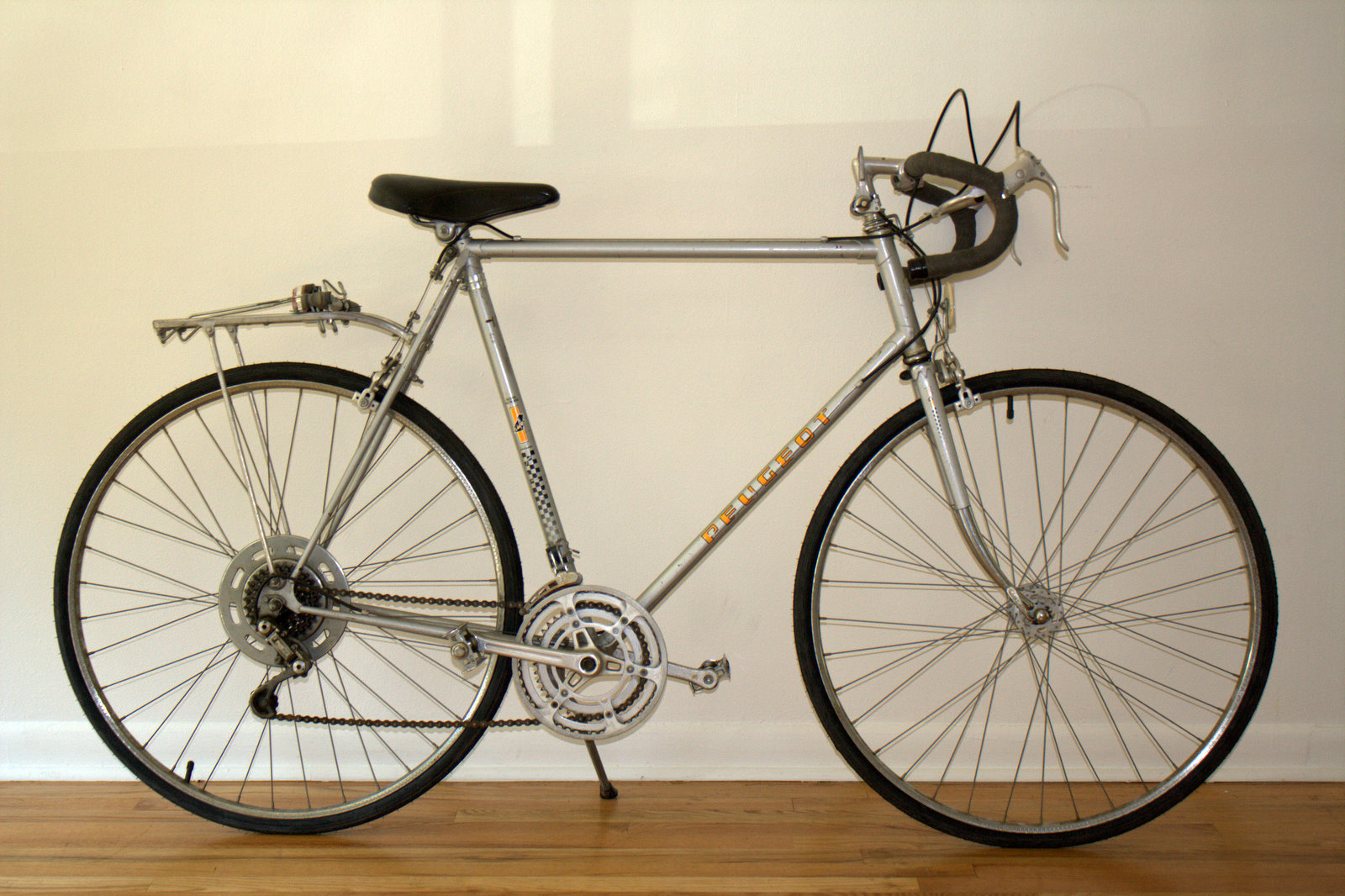
A French made 1979 Peugeot UO-9 "Super Sport"

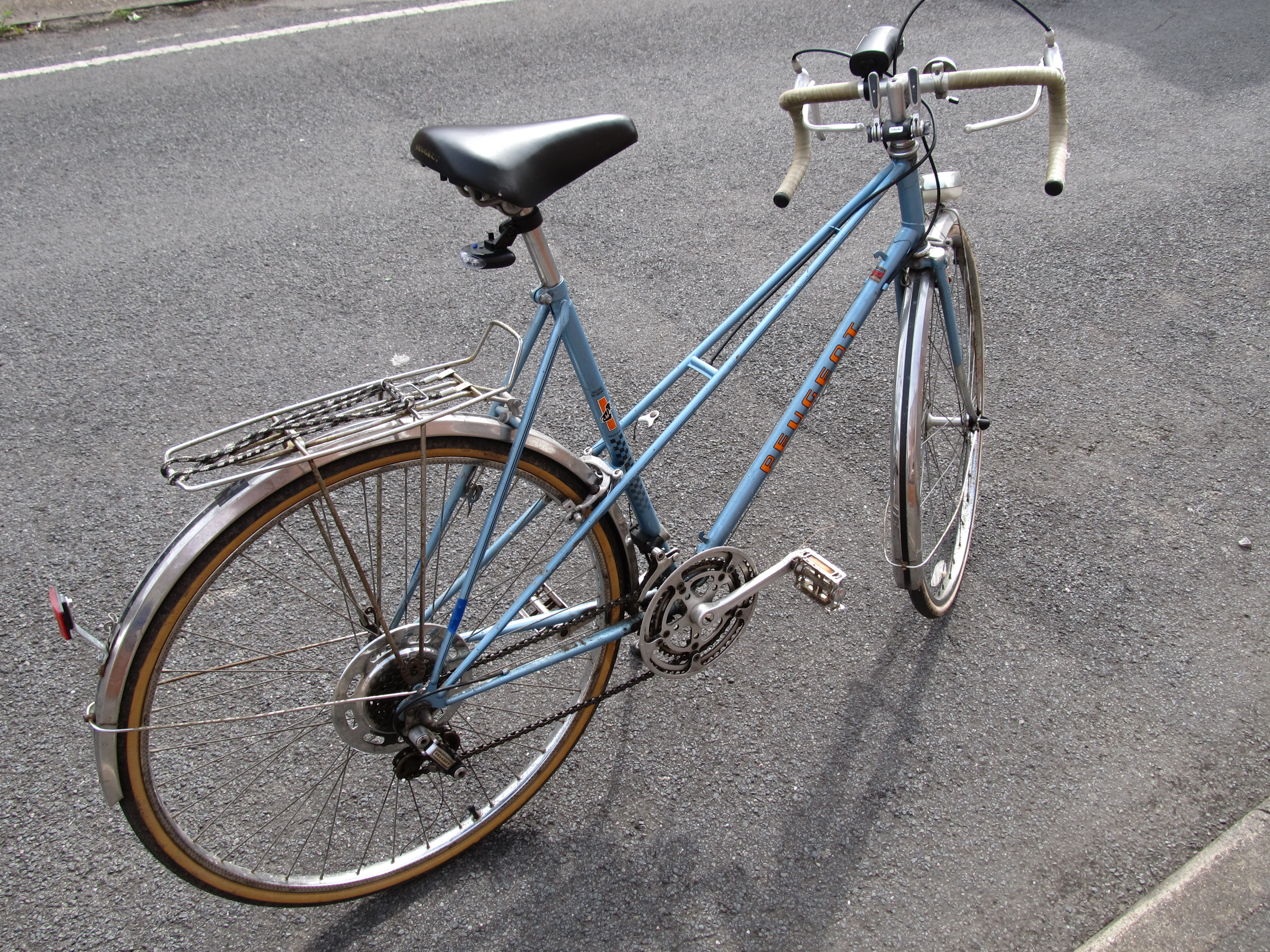
A 1981 mixte frame Ladies Sports PX18

During the first half of the 20th century, the vast majority of Peugeot bicycles came from the factories in Beaulieu (Mandeure), France. Other Peugeot bicycles were built in Spain and, after 1978 or so, in Canada.

The Peugeot UO-8, a low-end 'ten-speed' sports/touring bicycle with a mild steel frame, was introduced into the U.S. market in the 1960s and sold through to 1980. Equipped with Simplex derailleurs, the 28-lb. UO-8 of 1974 was considered to be an inexpensive 'all-round' derailleur-geared bicycle and had the characteristic long wheelbase of French bicycles, which provided stability and a soft ride on city streets and rough French rural roads. As a competitor to the heavier Schwinn Continental, the UO-8 was the most popular model distributed by Cycles Peugeot USA from its inception in 1974; it was sold in large numbers during the bike boom of 1972–1975. During the peak bike boom years (1972–1974), French bicycles were produced in numbers so large that quality control became an issue and parts were often substituted, swapped or otherwise thrown together to meet high production demands, sometimes resulting in an amalgamation of different models. In the case of Peugeot, problems included paint and weld issues, along with occasional frame misalignment.

In the United States, the AO-8 was the entry-level Peugeot 'ten-speed' bicycle, which competed directly against the Schwinn Varsity, the Raleigh Record, and Nishiki's Custom Sport. Equipped with fenders and a luggage rack, it was designated the AE-8.

The UE-8 was similar to the UO-8 but was equipped with fenders, a luggage rack, and generator lights. The AO-18, UO-18/18C, and UE-18 were mixte versions of the AO-8, UO-8 and UE-8, respectively. In France, these models were roughly equivalent to the P-, PL-, and PX-8-series Peugeot road bicycles.

First introduced as a model in 1953, the PX-10E was traditionally Peugeot's high-end bicycle. By the early 1970s, the 21 lb PX-10E used a frame made with Reynolds 531 manganese-molybdenum (MnMo) double-butted steel tubing and was fitted with lightweight aluminum alloy (Stronglite, Mafac, and Simplex) components, though by the mid-1980s it was upgraded to Campagnolo Nuovo Record crankset/pedals, derailleurs, and headset. The PX-10E was sold in the U.S. from 1975 to 1988 but it continued to be produced for sale in European markets through the early 1990s. Peugeot also produced lower cost bicycles with the PX-10's frame geometry: the PR-10 was made with three Reynolds 531 main tubes, and the PA-10 was made with hi-tensile tubing.

In 1974, Peugeot opened a custom bicycle frame shop (the Atelier Prestige) which specialized in the production of custom Reynolds-tubed framesets using thin-gauge butted steel tubing. These custom frames were designated PY-10. Similar to a PX-10 in design and styling, a PY-10 could be ordered to customers' individual specifications. Options included, but were not limited to, geometry and frame size, color, components, and braze-ons.

In 1977, the UO-10 was introduced, followed the next year by a slightly heavier road model, the UO-9. The UO-10 was largely the same as the UO-8 but with aluminum alloy cotterless crankset and aluminium alloy rims. The UO-9 was essentially the same as the UO-10 but had cheaper and heavier steel rims. In 1980, the PH-8 displaced the UO-8 as the entry-level Peugeot road bicycle.

In later years, the Peugeot race team switched to carbon fiber tubed bikes which were referred to as the PY10FC. During this time Peugeot continued to offer a custom steel-framed road bicycle, the PZ10. PZ and PY bicycles were imported to the U.S. until Cycles Peugeot's withdrawal from the North American market in 1990.

=== Factory and production changes (1974-2000) ===
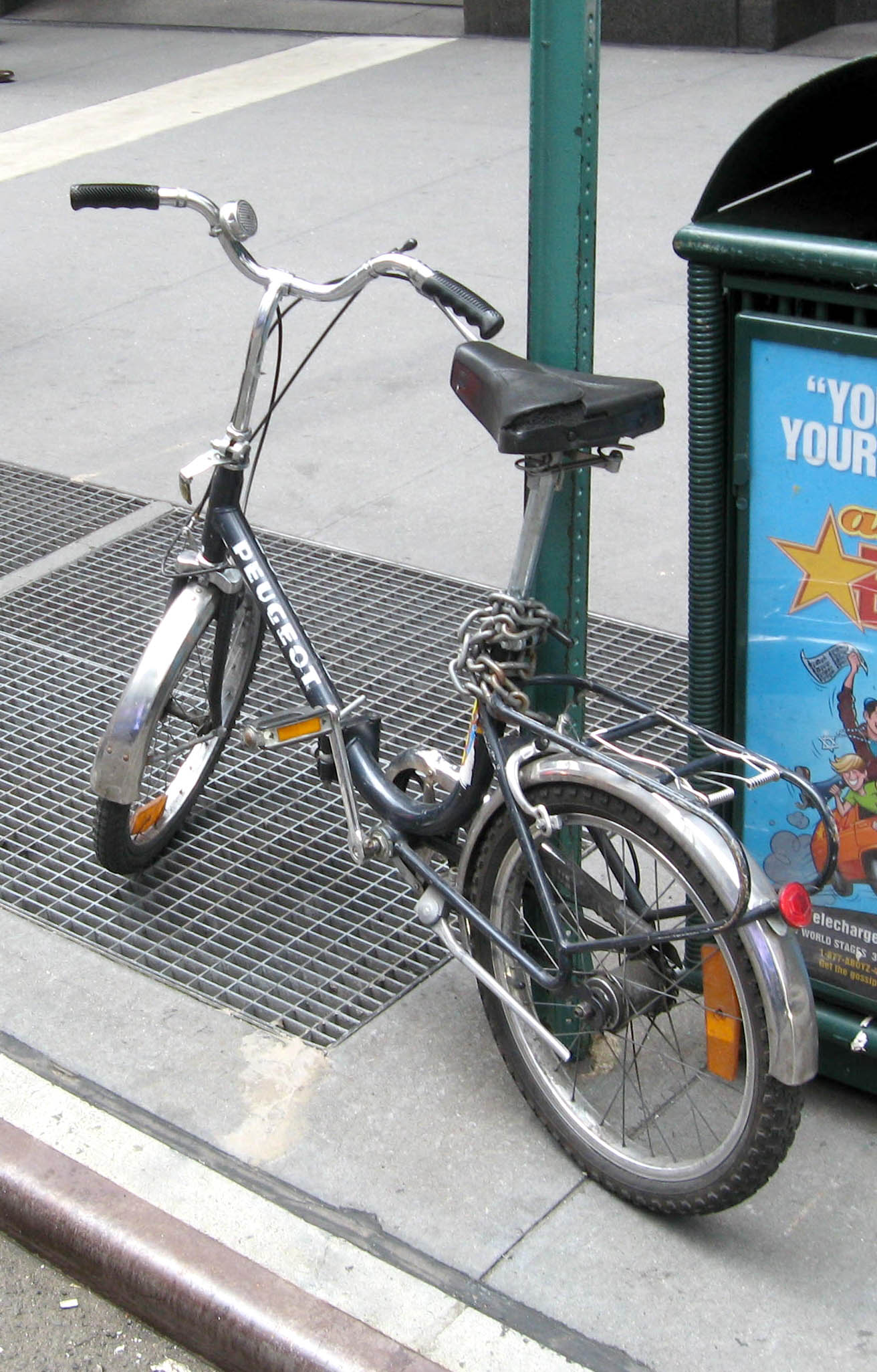
Folding Peugeot

In 1974, Cycles Peugeot acquired the factory of Romilly-sur-Seine, which was converted to produce bicycles. In 1978, Procycle Group of Canada signed an agreement to manufacture and distribute Peugeots in Canada, while French-built Peugeots continued to be sold in the US.

During the bicycle sales 'boom' of 1972–75, Peugeot sales increased dramatically. Aided by the racing heritage of the brand, demand for low- and mid-level Peugeot sport/touring or "ten speed" bicycles surged, particularly in the United States, and frequently exceeded supply. The aging Peugeot factory had difficulty supplying sufficient bicycles, and quality control occasionally suffered. Peugeot's reliance on French part suppliers began to impact sales after it became clear that Japanese firms were able to supply derailleurs and other components using more advanced designs and superior quality. By the mid-1980s, Peugeot bicycles had begun utilizing Japanese derailleurs on some of their lower end models.

By 1983, ProCycle was exporting Canadian-made Peugeots to the U.S.

In 1987, Cycles Peugeot merged with AOP (Acier et Outillages Peugeot) to form ECIA (Equipment et Composants pour I'Industrie Automobile), and the Romilly factory began producing all Peugeot bicycles. That same year, ProCycle of Canada acquired rights to distribute French-made Peugeots. In 1990, Cycles Peugeot sold the North American rights to market bicycles under the Peugeot name to the Canadian firm ProCycle.

In 2001, ProCycle discontinued the Peugeot bicycle brand. In Europe, the license to produce Peugeot-branded bicycles was granted to Cycleurope, a company making bicycles under different names. The licence was not renewed in 2004, though production of bicycles for export continued for another year.

=== 21st century ===
As of 2011 Peugeot-branded cycles are sold in Bulgaria, Denmark, France, Germany, Greece, Japan, Switzerland, Poland, Canada and Turkey.

The license to manufacture Peugeot branded bicycles was first granted to Cycleurope in 1992, but was not renewed in 2004. A new license to manufacture and to distribute worldwide was again granted in 2010 and the brand was revamped and relaunched in 2011.

== Current models ==
=== Road bikes ===
- R01
- R02
- R11
- R12
- R13
- R14
- R14C
- R15
- R16
- R17

Mountain bikes

- VTT - Filou
- VTT - Filou FS
- VTT - RC
- VTT - RC FS
- VTT - Hoggar
- M11
- M12
- M13
- M14
- M15
- M16
- M17
- M18
- M19
- JM241
- JM242
- JM244
- JM245
- JM246
- JM247
- JM248
- JM249

Hybrid bikes

- VTC - Black & Silver (Men's)
- VTC - Black & Silver (Mixed)
- VTC - Roland Garros
- VTC - 1007
- URBANITE 2.0
- URBANITE 6.0

City Shopper bikes

- Ville - Venice (Mixed)
- Ville - Venice (Men's)
- Ville - Dutch Lion (Mixed)
- Ville - Dutch Lion (Men's)
- C02
- C13
- C14

Folding bikes

- F13

Children's bikes

- Hoggar Junior
- Black & Silver Junior
- Harmonie Junior
- Color Line Junior
- J20
- J16
- JM20

== Discontinued models ==
Mountain bikes

- Fun - Ladies MTB (VT1 FW)
- US Express
- Canyon Express (VTT 2GW)
- Alpine Express (VTT 4BW) or (VTT 4L)
- Europe Express (VTT 6BW)
- Mont Blanc (VTT 2)
- Orient Express (unknown model number)
- Montreal Express (unknown model number)
- South Pacific 21
- Ranger (VTT24)

Touring bikes

- Carbolite (103)
- Cassis (PE 15TW)
- Chambord (Ladies)(PH 46W)
- Dordogne (PX531)
- Provence (P6GP)
- Provencelle (Ladies version of the Provence)
- Randonneur (PX 50)
- Savoie (PX531S)

Road bikes

- Aubisque (PE 10DW)
- Aspin (PE10 LS)
- Avoriaz (PE 10SW)
- Bordeaux (P 10DW)
- Carbon Pro
- Carbon Team Line
- Cologne
- Comete (A400)
- Corbier (P4)
- Cosmic (A300)
- Course (PB12)
- Fibre de Carbone (PY10FC)
- Galaxie (A500)
- Galibier (PGN10)
- Gentelmen (PR 60)
- Iseran (P6)
- Isoard (PX10)
- Izoard PE400
- Offensiv T500
- Lautaret (PE10 B)
- Leader 24 (C47CX) Junior racer
- Leader 20 (C38CX)
- LX 10
- Mont Blanc (PHE 20)
- Mont Cenis (PSN10)
- Perthus (PZ SIS)
- Premiere (P10N)
- Sports 10 (P4)
- Sports 5 (P4M5)
- Touraine
- Tourmalet (PH10)
- Triathlon (PSN10T)
- Tristar (PH501T)
- Ventoux (PH501)
- Ventoux - 2nd model line (PE300)
- Versailles (PE10 W)
- P8
- P0
- PA 10
- PC 10
- PL 50
- PSV 10
- PX 10
- PY 10
- PZ 10
- UE 8
- UO 5
- UO 9
- UO 12
- UO 14
- X80 Series

Small-wheel bicycles

- “BH” "Iberia"[actual model designation needed]
- D 22 Week-End
- D 40 Week-End
- R 22 Week-End
- R 40 Week-End
- Nouveau Style NS 22
- Nouveau Style NS 40
- Nouveau Style NSA 22
- Nouveau Style NSA 40
- Nouveau Style NSB 22
- Nouveau Style NSB 40
- Nouveau Style NSL 22
- Nouveau Style NSL 40
- Nouveau Style NSM 22
- Nouveau Style NSM 40
- Nouveau Style PNS 22
- Nouveau Style PNS 40
- Nouveau Style PNSA 22
- Nouveau Style PNSA 40
- Nouveau Style PNSL 22
- Nouveau Style PNSL 40
- Nouveau Style PNSM 22
- Nouveau Style PNSM 40
- Nouveau Style PNS 55 S
- Nouveau Style NS 522
- Nouveau Style NS 540
- Nouveau Style NS 622
- Nouveau Style NS 640
- Nouveau Style UNS 40
- Nouveau Style Juniors NC
- Nouveau Style Juniors NJ
- Nouveau Style Juniors NJD
- Nouveau Style Juniors NJM
- Nouveau Style Juniors PNC
- Nouveau Style Juniors PNJ
- Nouveau Style Juniors PNJD
- Nouveau Style Juniors PNJM
- P20/Round-A-Bout
- P500
- Week-End DA 22 (E designation added to exported variant)
- Week-End DA 40 (E designation added to exported variant)
- Week-End HR 22 (DA 22 detachable frame marketed under “Helium” brand)
- Week-End HP 22 (DA 22 foldable frame marketed under “Helium” brand)
- Week-End PA 22
- Week-End PA 40
- Week-End RA 22
- Week-End RA 40
- Week-End Juniors RJ (two variants)
- Week-End Juniors PJ (two variants)
- Week-End Juniors RM
- Week-End Juniors RML (possibly two variants)
- Week-End Juniors PML
- Week-End Juniors RC
- Week-End Juniors PC
- -- HTR Home Training Stand (converts detachable frame into an exercise cycle)

== See also ==
- Peugeot
- Peugeot (cycling team)
