= Fuji Bikes =

Japanese manufacturer of bicycles

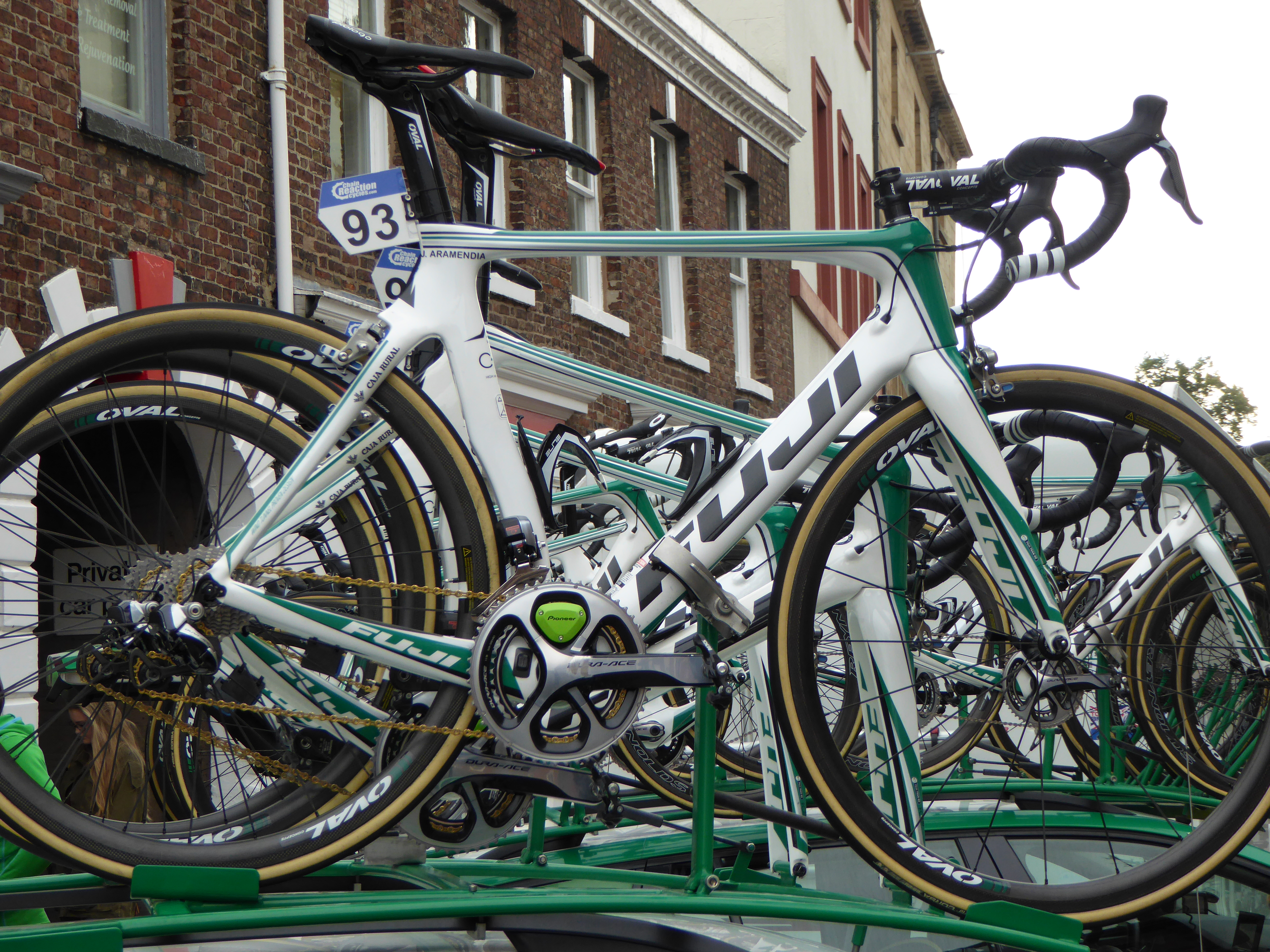
Fuji bicycles, used by the Caja Rural–Seguros RGA cycling team, at the 2016 Tour of Britain

Fuji Bikes is a brand of bicycles and cycling equipment. The company is a descendant of Nichibei Fuji Cycle Company, Ltd. (日米富士自転車株式会社), a bicycle manufacturer originally established in Japan in 1899. The company took its name and logo from Mount Fuji, a Japanese symbol of strength and endurance. The brand is currently owned by Ideal Bike Corporation.

== History ==
=== 1899 to 1998 ===
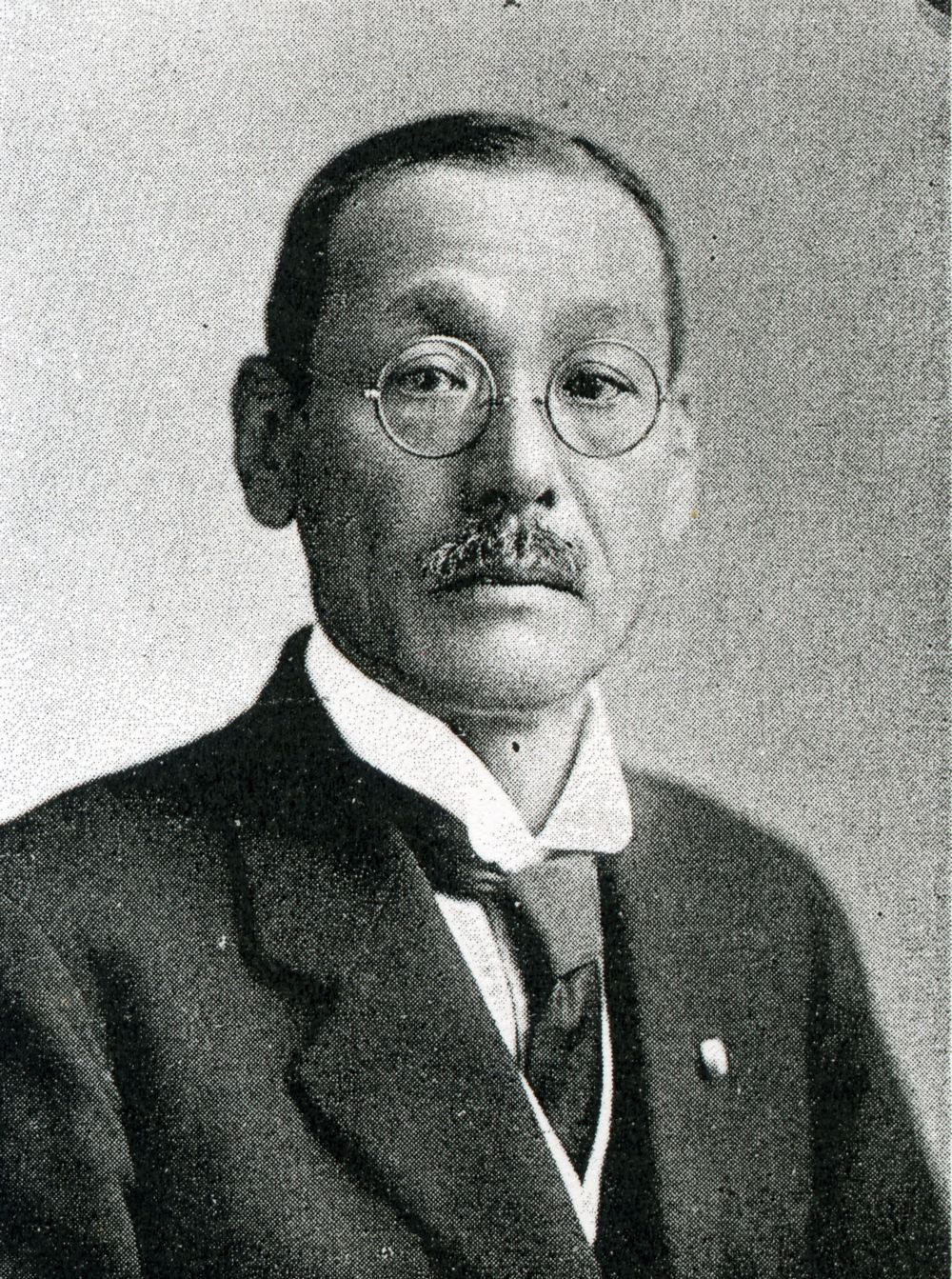
Founder, Okazaki Kyujiro（1874-1942）

The company was founded in 1899 in Japan by Okazaki Kyūjirō. In 1900 it was established under the trade name Nichibei Shōkai (literally 'Japanese-American Trading Company'). At first, it was importing and distributing US products, but later it began bicycle production in Japan.

By the late 1920s, Fuji was Japan’s most popular bicycle. In the 1930s, Fuji established the first national stage race between Osaka and Tokyo and sponsored the winning team. Today, this race remains a premier race in Asia. The first Asian games were held in New Delhi in 1951. Shoichiro Sugihara, riding a Fuji, won the first race.

During World War II the company name was changed to Dainippon Cycle, which after the war was changed back to Nichibei Fuji Cycle Company.

In the 1950s, Toshoku America acquired distribution rights to Fuji-made bicycles in the United States. Toshoku America sold private-label Fuji-made bicycles as house brands through U.S. retailers such as Sears & Roebuck and Montgomery Ward.

During this period, Fuji became a partner with several contractors supplying parts for Japanese bicycles, including Sugino Cycle Industries and SunTour. Sales expanded into other Asian markets. At the 1964 Tokyo Olympics, Fuji's chief engineer and designer, Dr Shoichiro Sugihara, designed the Japanese national team bicycles and was team coach. He repeated this role at the 1968 Olympics in Mexico and the 1972 Olympics in Munich, Germany.

By 1971, Fuji America was established to distribute models across the United States. Fuji played a part in the cycling boom of the 1970s. It introduced the first successful mass-production 12-speed bicycle in the mid-1970s, using a redesigned rear axle to minimize spoke dish to maintain wheel strength. In 1974, Richard Ballantine, author of Richard's Bicycle Book, recommended Fuji road bicycles at or near the top of each of four price and quality categories, from basic (low-price) to professional (high-end).

During the early 1980s, Fuji developed touring bicycles, and in 1986 was one of the first to manufacture frames of titanium. Fuji was not well situated to take advantage of the mountain bike boom of the 1980s. The demand for mountain bikes caused a steep decline in touring and road bike sales. This allowed manufacturers such as Specialized, Giant, and Trek to make inroads into Fuji's share of U.S. bicycle sales, often using frames produced at lower cost in Taiwan.

With the continued rise of the yen, Fuji fell on hard times in the early 1990s. One of the last Japanese bike companies to shift production to Taiwan after the fall of the dollar, Fuji bicycles cost more in the United States than most competing brands, causing a drop in sales. Fuji bicycles produced in Taiwan were not as well regarded by U.S. buyers as the Japanese-built bicycles. The company eventually designed new models, taking advantage of modern improvements in materials and construction techniques, but this proved insufficient. Toshoku America filed for bankruptcy in 1997, and in 1998, Nichibei Fuji Cycle Company Ltd., Fuji America's parent company, also declared bankruptcy.

==== Ownership Changes ====
The assets of Fuji America, as well as the worldwide distribution rights to the Fuji bicycle brand, were purchased by Philadelphia-based Advanced Sports International (ASI).

In 2004, Ideal Bike Corporation, Taiwan's third-largest complete-bicycle maker, acquired 17% of Advanced Sports International Asia, which markets the Fuji brand of bicycles in Asia. Fuji bicycles are now built in Taichung, Taiwan; Dong Guan, Guangdong Province, China; and in Kutno, Poland by Ideal Bike Corporation.

In November 2018 ASE (the parent company of ASI) declared bankruptcy. Originally HEAD was set to buy ASE's assets, but the deal was abandoned weeks later. On February 1, 2019 it was reported that three entities won the auction for ASE and would divide its assets among themselves. One of these, Pacific Glory Worldwide LLT (PGW) attained the global ownership of the Fuji, SE, and Tuesday brands. Sales of these brands were licensed by PGW to BikeCo in the USA.

In 2025, distribution shifted as Ideal Bike Corporation (Fuji's primary manufacturing partner) reinvested through PGW and announced plans to reclaim the brand and distribution. They formed PGW USA to manage the sales, marketing, and distribution of the Fuji Bikes, SE Bikes, and Tuesday Cycles brands. In August 2026 PGW launched the updated website and in September released 2027 Fuji models to bike shops in the United States.

== See also ==
- List of BMX bicycle manufacturers
- List of companies of Taiwan
