= BMX bike =

Off-road sport bicycle

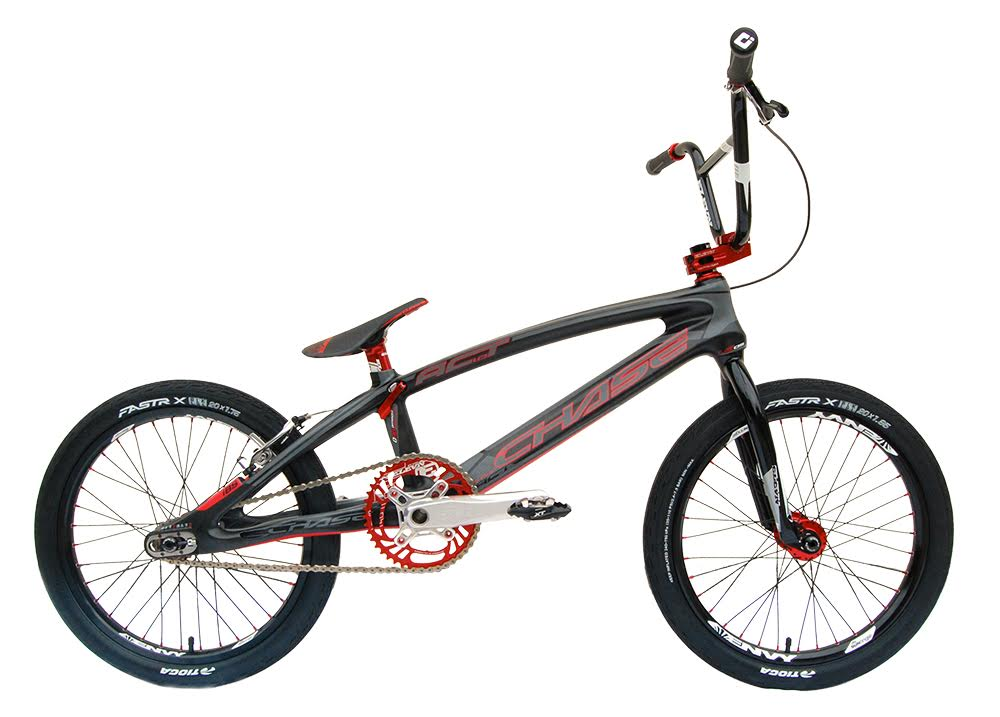
BMX race bike with carbon fiber frame and fork

A BMX bike is a bicycle used for cycle sport, specifically racing or stunt riding. BMX stands for bicycle motocross.

== Construction ==
Though originally denoting a bicycle intended for BMX racing, the term "BMX bike" is now used as a generic term to encompass race bikes ('class' and 'cruiser') and those used for freestyle disciplines (street, vert, park, flatland), and dedicated dirt jumper bicycles. Frames are made of various types of steel, aluminum, or carbon fiber.

Cheaper, low-end bikes are usually made of steel. Higher range freestyle bikes are mostly chromoly, such as lightweight 4130 chromoly, or generation 3 chromoly. BMX race bikes extensively use aluminum or carbon fiber. BMX bikes are smaller in size as compared to other bikes. These bikes come with thick and fat tires to absorb shocks and for better jumping. Generally, rear brakes are available only in racing BMX.

== Models ==
BM bicycles are available in these types:

- Dirt – These bikes feature tires with thicker and wider tread for better grip on potentially loose surfaces.
- Flatland – flatland style BMX bikes have different frame geometry to traditional park BMX bikes because flatland riding requires precise balance on multiple parts of the bike.
- Park – park style BMX bikes (also called vert) are often made lighter by reducing the structural strength of particular areas of the bike, which is possible because park riding does not occur on particularly rough terrain. Brakes may or may not be installed.
- Race – racing style BMX bikes feature lighter materials and slightly different frame geometry and sizes. Racing BMX bikes are required to have brakes. Their light weight construction and wide array of customizable gear ratios allow race bikes to accelerate quickly. Conversely, the lightweight construction means race bikes are not for freestyle (tricks) use.
- Street – modern street style BMX bikes commonly have nylon composite sleeved pegs attached to the axles to enable the rider to grind or balance on various raised obstacles. Metal pegs have fallen out of favor among street riders due to the unkempt nature of street obstacles. Also, the street BMX is heavier and stronger due to the extra strain encountered with the hard, flat surfaces of street riding. Street riders commonly have no cable brakes to enable the rider to spin the bars without the brake cable getting in the way. Riders use their foot against the top of the back tire to slow down, or fit a u-brake to the rear with an extended cable or a gyro to allow for full rotation of the bars.

== Notable BMX bike manufacturers ==
Current and former makers of BMX bikes include:

- Advanced Sports International
- Diamondback Bicycles
- Dynacraft BSC
- Ellsworth Handcrafted Bicycles
- Fuji Bikes
- GT Bicycles
- Hutch BMX
- Haro Bikes
- Huffy
- JMC Bicycles
- Mongoose
- Next
- Nishiki
- Pacific Cycle
- Raleigh
- Redline bicycles
- Ross
- SE Racing
- Schwinn Bicycle Company
- Torker

== See also ==
- Dirt jumping
- Pump track
- Cycling
- Glossary of cycling
- Mini velo, small-wheel bicycle with a reasonable sized frame
- Outline of cycling
- Fixed-gear bicycle
- Stance bike
