= List of BMX bicycle manufacturers =

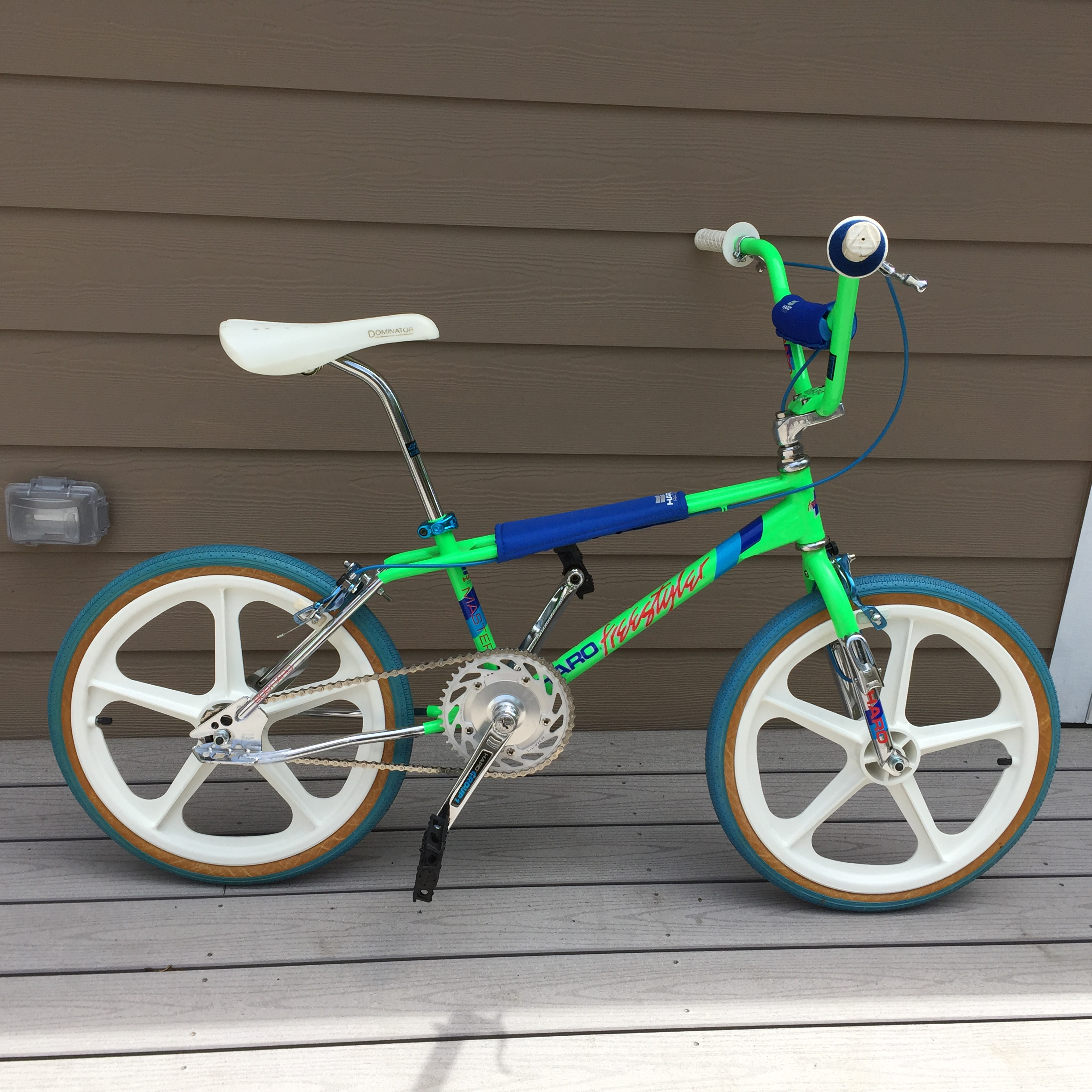
The Haro Freestyle BMX bike

List of BMX bicycles is a list of former and current manufacturers of BMX bicycles.

== A ==
- Advanced Sports International – American bicycle company

== C ==
- Cannondale – Bicycle company
- Colony BMX – Australian BMX Bicycle manufacturer
- Cortina Cycles is a bicycle frame manufacturer in Santa Barbara, California
- CW Racing BMX manufacturer in Orange, California
- CYC Stormer BMX bike

== D ==
- Devlin Custom Cycles - Australian BMX Bicycle manufacturer
- Diamondback was founded as a BMX brand in 1977 by Western States Imports in Newbury Park, California, which sold bikes under the Centurion (bicycle) brand. Became a highly regarded name in BMX.
- Dynacraft BSC – American Bicycle distributor

== E ==
- Ellsworth Handcrafted Bicycles is a bicycle manufacturer based in San Diego, CA. Founded by Tony Ellsworth in 1991.

== F ==
- Fuji Bikes – Japanese manufacturer of bicycles

== G ==
- GHP BMX Frame, fork, bars and seat post manufacturer
- GT Bicycles a company started by Gary Turner.

== H ==
- Haro named for Bob Haro it was a freestyle BMX bike with pegs.
- Huffy – Bicycle manufacturer and brand of Ohio, U.S.
- Hutch BMX – American BMX bicycle manufacturer

== J ==
- JMC BMX Chrome Moly BMX frame and forks

== K ==
- Kuwahara BMX chrome frame with red wheels.

== L ==
Laguna BMX bike

== M ==
- Mongoose – BMX Bicycle manufacturer
- Murray In 1977, again following a youth trend, Murray introduced its BMX model.

== N ==
- Next (bicycle company) is an American bicycle brand distributed by Dynacraft BSC.

== O ==
- Odyssey BMX since 1985.

== P ==
- Patterson Racing - chrome molly BMX frames and forks.

== R ==
- Race Inc. BMX bicycle frame manufacturer
- Redline Bicycles is an American company offering BMX, freestyle, cyclocross, mountain (MTB), and road bicycles
- Robinson Pro BMX bike company started by Chuck Robinson.

== S ==
- Schwinn introduced the Scrambler in 1975
- Skyway BMX frame and fork manufacturer
- SE Racing named for Scot Breithaupt (Scot Enterprises) they manufactured the PK Ripper

== T ==
- Torker Started in 1977 manufacturing a BMX bike frame. The first Haro bikes were made by Torker.

== W ==
- West Coast Cycle produced the brand Cyclepro BMX

== See also ==
- List of bicycle brands and manufacturing companies

== Advertiser Blitzkrieg ==
Planet BMX 1999 (Aus) Graffiti project BMX XXX
