= China Krys Darrington =

American racing cyclist

Personal information
- Born: October 9, 1970 (age 56) North Hampton, Ohio

Cycling career
- Sport: Cycling
- Discipline: BMX freestyle
- Role: Professional BMX rider

Professional team
- GT Bicycles

China Krys Darrington (born October 9, 1970 in North Hampton, Ohio as Krystin Lou Dauchy) is the first sponsored female Freestyle BMX rider. In 1986, she rode for GT Bicycles in Huntington Beach, California. She started riding in 1983 after finding a BMX Plus! magazine in the locker of another junior high school student at Old Trail School.

Her interest lead her to begin purchasing individual bike parts from Eddy's Bike Shop in Stow, Ohio until she had built herself an original Haro Bikes Master freestyle bike. She used this to race at Derby Downs NBL race track in Akron, Ohio and began to learn the tricks more appropriate for that model of bicycle.

At an NBL national event, she drew the attention of HARO pro rider Pete Loncarevich who asked her, "If you're into freestyle, why aren't you in Columbus, Ohio, where there is an AFA event?" Krys didn't know what the AFA was, but soon learned it was the American Freestyle Association. Within the month she was signed up for the next Ohio AFA event in Columbus, Ohio. She rode in the 14-15 novice class and got 1st place. The event organizer directed her to attend the next AFA national, which was being held the following month on Long Island, New York. She rode against 120 riders (all males) and took 2nd place. Coincidentally, Mat Hoffman was also attending this event as his first national. After the contest, Krys received multiple offers for sponsorship and decided on riding for GT Bicycles. Her manager, Harold McGoo McGruther, and her teammates, Gary Pollack, Josh White, Martin Aparijo, and Eddie Fiola, appeared in numerous photo shoots and contest from 1986 to 1988 wearing the GT uniform.

She was known for her extreme flexibility that helped her create tricks like the Invertebraetor and the Nourie-stands where her feet came to rest on her forehead. The fact that no other female was competing on the national circuit kept Krys in the spotlight of a male-dominated sport. She taught at Woodward Camp in Woodward, PA from 1985-1988. She started her tenure there in 1984 as a camper and got to watch the camp expand to accommodate the surge in popularity of BMX and Freestyle riding. She switched sponsors in 1988 to General Bicycles of New Jersey. Some think the switch was to be able to travel with her then-beau Mark Roldan of New York City. She however stopped competing in 1989 and abruptly dropped out of the Freestyle scene.

She completed her B.F.A. in Fine Arts, Photography from the University of Akron in 1994.

In December 2010, she was interviewed by FATBMX.COM for "Girls Week".

In December 2012, Danny Sirkin Superfan site interviewed her for "Anarchy in Anderson, AMFLT#3 Anderson, Indiana."
