= Eddie Fiola =

American professional freestyle BMX rider and film stuntman

- Fiola at Coasters Arena, 1985

Personal information
- Full name: Edward Lynn Fiola
- Nicknames: The Flying Banana; The King of the Skateparks
- Born: September 28, 1964 (age 62) Bellflower, California, U.S.
- Height: 5 ft 4 in (1.63 m)

Cycling career
- Sport: Cycling
- Discipline: BMX freestyle
- Role: Professional BMX rider
- Rider type: Skatepark, Flatland, Vert, Ramp

Professional teams
- -: Premier Helmets
- -: Bottema forks
- -: Torker
- -: SE Racing
- -: Haro Bikes
- -: Kuwahara (bicycle company)
- -: GT Bicycles
- -: Citicat
- -: Faction Bike Co

Edward Lynn "Eddie" Fiola (born Sep 28, 1964) is an American former professional freestyle BMX rider, and a film stuntman.

In 1982 Bob Morales started up the ASPA (Amateur Skatepark Association which would later become the AFA or American Freestyle Association) and began the king of the skateparks competitions in the USA. Eddie Fiola would go on to win it a total of 5 times along with 4 freestyle Nora (Number One Rider Award) cups including the first one ever to be awarded in 1985 and with having the idea for the potts modification or hollow stem bolt. This led to him becoming one of the most famous and highly paid freestyle BMX riders of his time reputedly earning around $100,000 in a year and appearing on the cover of countless magazines. Later he became a stuntman in films such as The Dukes of Hazzard, The Italian Job and Indiana Jones and the Kingdom of the Crystal Skull.

== Career in BMX ==
In the spring of 1981 I was hearing occasional rumours of a guy in Lakewood who rode skateparks and was really hot. So I tracked him down. In my opinion, in my time, NOBODY was better in skateparks than Eddie. He and I came to be good friends, NOBODY was a better guy.

— Bob Osborn publisher of BMX Action magazine, vintagebmx.com, March 2005

My first sponsor was Premier helmets, then Torker (they just gave us bikes)

— Eddie Fiola, Transworld BMX April 2003

In 1982 Haro Bikes rider Bob Morales helped with a deal to get Fiola on the team, however determined to go it alone, they both left Haro and signed with Kuwahara to help design and promote the E.T. the Extra-Terrestrial BMX bike at the end of the year. Fiola won the first 16+ expert class in the King of the Skateparks.

In 1983 after leaving Kuwahara (bicycle company) he signed with GT Bicycles alongside Bob Morales and then went on to co-design, with Morales, one of the most iconic BMX freestyle frames, the GT Performer. He performed a show with Bob Morales at the Super Bowl of Motocross in the Anaheim Stadium in front of 40,000 people. He was a judge for the World Amateur Championship of BMX and won the 17+ expert class King of the Skateparks series.

In 1984 he became the first member of the renamed ASPA which is now known as the AFA. He won the GT-BMX summer freestyle championship in Venice beach California and visited the UK to take part in the televised Kellogg’s freestyle BMX competition alongside fellow country man and main competitor in the King of the Skateparks series, Mike Dominguez. He won the series with the commentator naming him “the flying banana” due to his all yellow bike and apparel with “TRIX R 4 KIDZ” printed on the backside of his pants. Just after he visited Livingston skatepark with Dominguez for an article in BMX Action bike magazine and was interviewed for the Edinburgh Evening News. Later he visited Paris for a demonstration with fellow American freestyler R. L. Osborn at the 1st Bicross International in the Palais Omnisports de Paris-Bercy arena. He won the first pro class at King of the Skateparks series, and also won the BMX Plus! and BMX Action bike magazine freestyler of the year.

In 1985 he embarked on the GT freestyle world tour alongside fellow GT rider Dave Breed visiting 15 countries (Saudi Arabia, Japan, Australia, England, Ireland, Northern Ireland, Wales, Scotland, France, Belgium, the Netherlands, West Germany, Denmark, Sweden and the United States, including Hawaii) over a 3-month period from May through July performing shows and making television appearances. While on tour, he entered the second UK Kellogg’s Frosties televised competition finishing 4th overall. He appeared in the Freestyles Raddest Tricks video and won the Freesytlin’ magazines NORA cup and the BMX Plus! freestyler of the year. He finished 2nd in the King of the Skatepark series to his great rival Mike Dominguez.

In 1986 he was hired as a technical advisor and stunt rider on the Hal Needham film Rad with actor Bill Allen, who had to dye his hair to match Fiolas. It is said that the film is loosely based around Fiola's life. He starred in the GTV video and was one of the riders in RAD TV: The Sequel video. He won a controversial IBMXF Freestyle World Championships in Vancouver and finished 2nd overall in the AFA Masters Series. He became the BMX Plus! freestyler rider of the year and won the Freestylin’ magazine NORA cup. He also won the pro class King of the Skateparks series, the last one to ever be held.

In the history of freestyle competition there has probably been no call more controversial than the one made against Fiola at this contest. Even after taking away his win in pro ramps because he didn’t wear a mouthguard, the judges still had to give him the overall Pro title.

— BMX Plus! magazine December 1986

In 1987 he took part in the GT Demo tape video and then left GT and signed a deal to promote Citicat bikes which was shortened due to production problems. He took part in the 101 freestyle tricks video.

In 1988 he was testing bikes for BMX Plus! magazine.

We don’t know how many of our readers will remember this, but back around four years ago Eddie Fiola spent a brief time as a test rider for this magazine. He only did it for a couple of months or so before GT decided to sponsor him. GT didn’t want it’s riders testing bikes for any magazines, so Eddie had to leave us. All the same, we have learned over the years we’ve known him, that Eddie is one of the most knowledgeable freestyle riders in the world. He’s incredibly bright about bikes, extremely innovative, and an extraordinary rider. We asked him a couple of months ago if he’d be interested in testing bikes for us, and he said “yes”.

— BMX Plus! magazine July 1988

I was at the AFA finals in Kansas in late 1988. From what I know, that was Fiola's last competition after having been gone for nearly a year. I saw his flatland run and it was really cool, though he didn't do anything new (and did touch several times) - but he just did everything with a ton of style. He ended up getting 5th (which was last, a very low Pro turnout). I think the crowd booed that.

— Josh Marsele, www.vintagebmx.com

In 1990 he was riding for Vans and Bully, touring with Josh White and Scotty Freeman.

In 1992 he was still doing shows with some support from GT and Vans.

In 2004 he hooked up with Redline BMX.

In 2005 he was interviewed in the film Joe Kid on a Stingray, the history of BMX.

In 2006 he performed a July 4 BMX show with Todd Anderson in Orange County, California.

In 2008 he was awarded with a white GT pro Performer at the OS-BMX gathering as a tribute to his achievements.

In 2009 he was inducted into the American Bicycle Association (ABA) Hall of Fame (Freestyle Pioneer) He also takes part in the OS-BMX Old School Reunion 2009 at Peck Park California

In 2010 he took part in the old school reunion at Woodward West camp in California. He was riding Faction 22" BMX bikes and was a part of their test team.

In 2011, he appeared on the front cover of Classic BMX Magazine issue 6 with an interview inside.

In 2012, he was a performer in Gale Webb Extreme Sports and Air Shows in California. He launched his own website.

In 2013, he launcheed his own frame and handlebar combo called the EF|Proformer, limited to 250 sets.

== Personal life ==
Fiola married Mindi Neill on his birthday in 1991. They have one daughter named Audrey. On December 14, 2021, Fiola announced his biography was in the works and the book was being written by lifelong fan and author Billy Henrickle. In September 2023 a documentary film on Fiola’s life went into production with filmmaker Billy Henrickle producing and directing the film.

== Film and television credits ==
Stunt work

- Contraband (2012 film) (2012)
- Paul (film) (2011)
- The Birth of Big Air (2010)
- The Cape (2010)
- The Hangover (2009)
- Where the Wild Things Are (2009)
- Indiana Jones and the Kingdom of the Crystal Skull (2008)
- "Fear Factor" (2006)
- The Dukes of Hazzard (2005)
- Buffalo Dreams (2005)
- The Cat in the Hat (2003)
- The Italian Job (2003)
- Biker Boyz (2003)
- American Icarus (2002)
- Jackass: The Movie (2002)
- Redemption (2002)
- The One (2001)
- Max Keeble's Big Move (2001)
- Crazy/Beautiful (2001)
- The Base (1999)
- From Dusk Till Dawn 2: Texas Blood Money (1999)
- I Got the Hook Up (1998)
- Slappy and the Stinkers (1998)
- The Company Man (1998)
- The Maker (1997)
- Bean (1997)
- The Pest (1997)
- Prey of the Jaguar (1996)
- The Paper Brigade (1996)
- Spy Hard (1996)
- The Secret Agent Club (1996)
- Rage (1995)
- Radioland Murders (1994)
- Rad (1986)

Acting

- Walker, Texas Ranger TV episode x2
- From Dusk Till Dawn 2: Texas Blood Money (1999)

Self

- The Birth of Big Air (2010)
- Joe Kid on a Stingray (2005)
- Pacific Blue, television series
