= Bob Morales =

American bicycle motocross rider

- 1980

Personal information
- Full name: Robert L. Morales
- Nickname: BME
- Born: December 7, 1963 (age 62) Redondo Beach, California
- Height: 5 ft 10 in (1.78 m)

Cycling career
- Sport: Cycling
- Current team: Retired
- Discipline: Bicycle Motocross (BMX) / Freestyle BMX
- Role: Racer / Performer
- Rider type: Racing / Freestyle

Amateur teams
- 1977-1978: Barons Bike Shop
- 1979-1980: Buena Park Bike Shop

Professional teams
- 1980-1981: HARO DESIGNS
- 1982: KUWAHARA
- 1983-1984: GT BICYCLES
- 1985: DYNO BICYCLES

Robert L. Morales (born December 7, 1963) is a former freestyle BMX rider turned promoter, designer, inventor and business executive. He is the founder of DYNO Bicycles, the American Freestyle Association (AFA), Auburn Cycles, KORE Bicycle Components, Morales Bicycle Co., Carlsbad Motocross Racing (CMXR) and ASV Inventions. He is currently president and CEO of ASV Inventions, Inc.

== History ==
Morales began riding motorcycles at the age of 7, then racing motorcycles at the age of 11. His father bought him a Yamaha YZ 80 to compete in motorcycle races. He won over 20 dirt biking trophies by 1976. He took up BMX bike racing at the age of 13 when his parents could no longer support his motorcycle racing because of a divorce.

Around 1977, he got into BMX racing by competing in a local BMX race where he met fellow racer R.L. Osborn and they became good friends. R.L. Osborn's father was the founder of BMX Action magazine and became a pioneer in the sport of BMX and Freestyle BMX. Through the Osborns he met Bob Haro who would later pioneer the sport of Freestyle BMX.

At age 14 Morales started his first business and named it BME which stood for Bob Morales Enterprises. BME sold BMX brand stickers and apparel as a vendor at BMX tracks and through mail order advertisements in BMX magazines. BME eventually became DYNO Design in 1983.

In 1980 Bob Haro asked Morales to join him on a national tour to promote the new sport of Freestyle BMX. They traveled on tour together performing shows all over the Midwest, Eastern United States, and parts of Canada to enthusiastic crowds. In 1982 Morales began promoting Freestyle BMX competitions and formed the Amateur Skate Park Association (ASPA), which would later become the American Freestyle Association (AFA), to promote events in this fast-growing sport. At its peak in 1986 the AFA hosted a BMX Freestyle competition at Madison Square Garden in New York City with over 5,000 spectators and a large cash purse for the competitors.

Morales joined friend and fellow freestyle rider Eddie Fiola and formed the founding BMX Freestyle teams for Haro Bikes (1980), Kuwahara (bicycle company) (1982), and GT Bicycles (1983).

In 1982, Oakley, Inc. founder Jim Jannard asked Morales and Fiola to perform at the AMA Supercross at Anaheim Stadium in front of 40,000 spectators. Jannard also invited Morales & Fiola to perform at an Oakley, Inc. "Factory Pilot Nite", an exclusive Oakley athlete party at Oakley, Inc. headquarters which were located in Lake Forest at that time. Jannard and his company Oakley, Inc. have been a lifelong inspiration for Morales and his product designs.

Morales stopped riding professionally in 1985 to concentrate on his two businesses: the American Freestyle Association (AFA) and DYNO Design which has made BMX accessories since 1983. In 1985 he sold DYNO Design (which later became DYNO Bicycles) to GT Bicycles and went to work for them as a designer. He was awarded his first patent while working at GT Bicycles for a bicycle frame design.

Also in 1985 Morales appeared in the first action-sports themed television commercial for Mountain Dew soda with fellow pro freestyle BMX riders Eddie Fiola, R.L. Osborn, Ron Wilkerson and Pat Romano. Later that year Morales became a member of the Screen Actors Guild (SAG) and pursued a career in commercial acting appearing in several national commercials.

Morales founded Mor Distributing in 1985 and brought in partner Todd Huffman in 1986. Mor Distributing started out as a distributor of bicycles and parts for other companies like DYNO. In 1988 Morales and Huffman created their own brands including Auburn Cycles using a unique two-piece frame design by Morales. Scootster brand scooters were also created under Mor Distributing to compete in the fast-growing scooter segment of the bicycle market at that time. They later sold the Auburn brand to GT Bicycles in 1992. GT went on to market and sell Auburn bicycles for many years. Morales formed Group B Design in 1989 to provide product and advertising design to the bicycle industry. Group B clients included HUTCH Bicycles, Iron Horse Bicycles, and Western Auto. Another patent was awarded to Morales for a bicycle frame design called the "A Frame" for Iron Horse Bicycles. Morales is credited with building the Iron Horse brand of bicycles into an internationally recognized brand.

KORE Bicycle Components was founded by Morales in 1988 and he was awarded three more patents for bicycle part designs for BMX and Mountain Bikes. In 1993 several financial partners had joined KORE. In 1993 Morales formed the MORALES Bicycle Company to market and distribute bicycle frame designs that he had created for the BMX and Mountain Bike markets. Morales sold his interest in KORE to his partners in 1998. He retained ownership rights of Morales Bicycle Co.

Later in 1998 he began promoting motocross races at the legendary Carlsbad Raceway and formed a racing club called CMXR (Carlsbad Motocross Racing). In early 2000 Morales founded ASV Inventions, Inc. to develop, market and distribute his inventions. ASV developed into a leading brand of motorcycle parts and accessories and Morales had been awarded several more patents for products marketed under the ASV brand. In late 2007 ASV Inventions acquired Universal Engineering, Inc. a brand of motocross parts and accessories.

In 2011 Morales introduced his family to BMX racing at one of the local BMX tracks that he had raced at as a youth. Morales' middle son Dane Morales took well to racing bicycles and went on to achieve success in BMX racing on a national and international level. Morales' involvement with his young son's racing inspired him to begin designing BMX racing products for young BMX racers. In 2013 Morales re-established his former bicycle brand Auburn Cycles with the introduction of an American made BMX mini racing frame designed specifically for his son Dane to race and develop.

On September 8, 2018, Morales was inducted into the National BMX Hall of Fame in a ceremony at the Olympic training center in Chula Vista, California. Morales was inducted for his contributions to the BMX bicycle industry.

In addition to two wheel (Cycle) interests, Morales has also been involved with four wheel (cars & karts) sports as well.

In September 2019, Morales founded ASV Motorsports, a Porsche 911 automobile service business. Morales has been a longtime Porsche automobile enthusiast since his early 20s and has been restoring, buying and selling Porsche automobiles as a hobby since the early 1980s. Morales appeared in a photo with one of his early Porsche cars alongside his partner Todd Huffman and his car in a 1986 BMX Action magazine interview and photo spread with the two partners about their business Mor Distributing, the parent company of Scootster Scooters and Auburn Cycles.

Morales has been a longtime member of the Porsche Club of America (PCA) and the Porsche Owners Club (POC) and has also competed in sports car racing events with these two clubs since the early 2000's and has earned awards and championships in automobile and Kart racing. Morales still participates in motorcycle, karting and automobile competitions.

== Personal life ==
Morales was married to Susan Rogers from 1991-1999 Morales was married to Marry Sorensen from 2002-2021. They have three sons: Maximilian, Dane & Jackson Morales. Morales married Christine Ford on 12/27/2024.
