= R. L. Osborn =

American bicycle racer (born 1963)

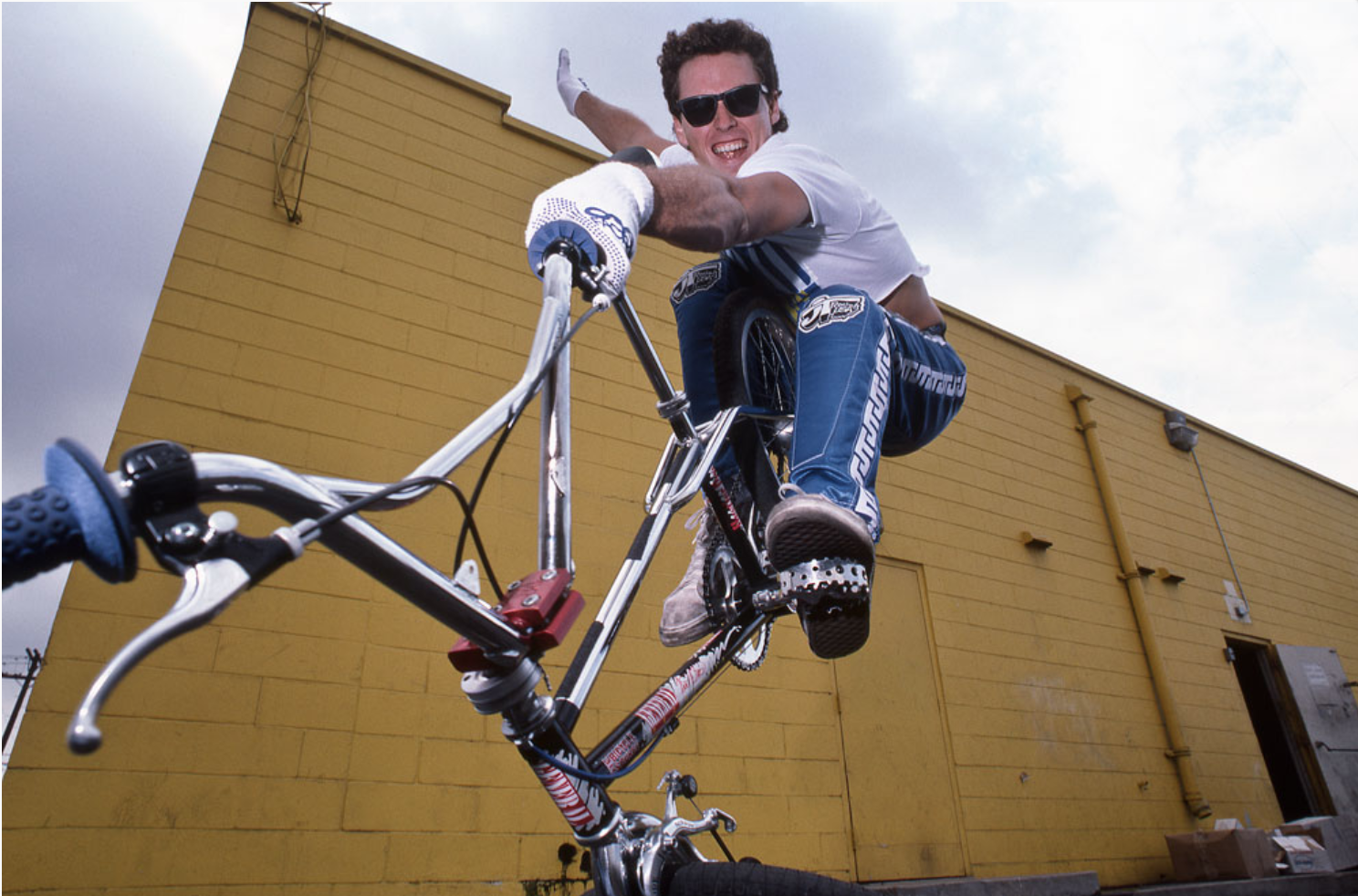

Personal information
- Full name: Robert Lewis Osborn
- Nickname: RL
- Born: April 9, 1963 (age 63)

Cycling career
- Sport: Cycling
- Discipline: BMX freestyle
- Role: Professional BMX rider/company owner
- Rider type: Flatland, Vert, Ramp

Professional team
- –: BMX Action Trick Team

Robert Lewis Osborn (born April 9, 1963) is a BMX rider. His father Bob Osborn started BMX Action magazine. He, along with Mike Buff and Bob Haro are considered the forefathers of BMX freestyle, a style of BMX bike riding that involves flatland and ramp tricks.

== Career ==
In 1978, R.L. and Bob Haro teamed up to create the very first freestyle BMX team, which made its debut at ABA's Winternationals in Chandler, AZ and then another show in Amarillo, Texas at an ABA BMX Race. Shortly after those shows, R.L. Osborn and Bob Haro had a falling out and parted ways.

In 1981 R.L. and Buff created the BMX Action Trick Team, the first BMX freestyle team that toured in a van and put on shows for fans of the sport using a portable kickramp and quarter pipe.

R.L. Osborn quickly rose to fame when he appeared on That's Incredible! in 1983, where he raced a horse. He also appeared as a stunt rider in the 1986 movie Rad.

He was the first BMX rider to popularize BMX freestyle (flatland) and the first person to use endorsements to become the first millionaire in the sport. He was endorsed by Haro, ACS, General, A'ME, and Redline. He founded Hammer Bodywear in 1988 and Bully Bikes in 1989. In 1991, he sold the companies to MCS in Florida.

=== Departure from biking ===
In 1992, R.L. Osborn stepped away from professional BMX riding and started a carpet cleaning business, which he still owns and operates today.

In 2009, R.L. Osborn was bestowed the highest honor when he was inducted into the National BMX Hall of Fame along with legendary riders such as Mike Buff, Eddie Fiola, Danny Oakley, D.D. Leone, Troy Lee, and special recognition to Jeremy McGrath.

=== Return to biking and video content ===
On a May 8, 2020 Facebook post, R.L. Osborn announced that he was getting back into BMX freestyle riding. His oldest son, Dylan Osborn was brought in as a producer of video and photo content for all R.L. Osborn social media and his official website.

Much of the content created are "how-to" videos of BMX tricks, a regular Q and A series with R.L. Osborn, as well as a step-by-step process of customizing an original General RL Osborn signature bike. On occasion, Dylan Osborn will step out from behind the camera to join his father in videos, as well as RL's friend, Patrick Trantham, who works with R.L. at the R.L. Osborn Carpet Cleaning Company.

In his return to the BMX freestyle world, R.L. Osborn has found new sponsorships with Etnies, SE Racing, Flatland Fuel, JD Cycle Supply, and BSD Bikes.
