= Dauchy =

Dauchy is a surname. Notable people with the surname include:

- Krys Dauchy (born 1970), American cyclist
- Marie Dauchy (born 1987), French politician

== See also ==
- Duchy
