= Diamondback Bicycles =

American bicycle brand

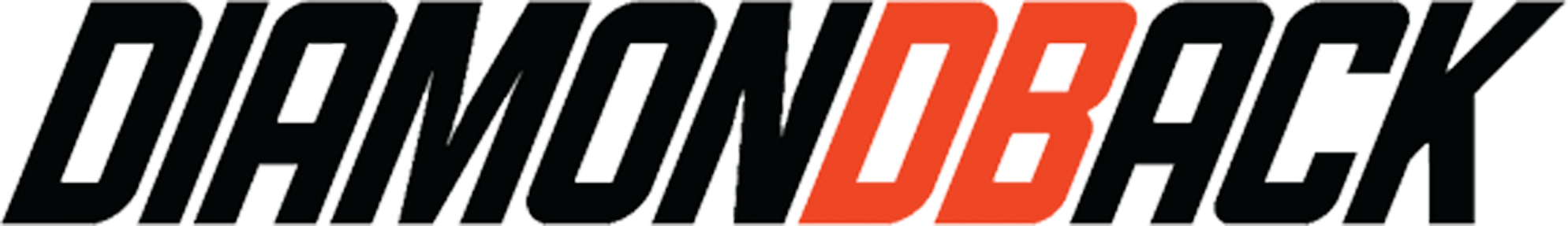
- Industry: Bicycles
- Predecessor: Western States Imports
- Founded: 1977; 49 years ago
- Headquarters: Kent, Washington, United States
- Products: BMX
- Owner: Regent, L.P.
- Website: diamondback.com

Diamondback Bicycles is an American bicycle brand that is based in Kent, Washington. Diamondbacks are sold in many countries, including the United States, Australia, Canada, and the United Kingdom.

Most Diamondbacks are considered to be mid-type bicycles, with a high-end prototype in development as of 2011. Diamondback is owned by global private equity firm Regent, L.P., which also owns Redline Bicycles.

== History ==
Diamondback Bicycles was founded as a BMX brand in 1977 by Western States Imports in Newbury Park, California, which sold bikes under the Centurion (bicycle) brand. Early in its history, the brand name was "Diamond Back" and in 1994 this changed to "DiamondBack" and then to "Diamondback." Beginning in 1990, Western States Imports started selling its mountain bikes and road bicycles under the Diamondback name as well. Since 1979, many riders have successfully competed under the sponsorship of Diamondback, which began with BMX and expanded to Mountain Bikes with the creation of Diamondback Racing (DBR) in 1993.

In 1999, Diamondback Bicycles was purchased by the Derby Cycle Corporation, which also owned the Raleigh Bicycle Company, and merged Raleigh and Diamondback together. In 2001, Derby Cycle Corporation sold Raleigh and Diamondback. In August 2019 Accell Group sold Diamondback to Regent, L.P.

Diamondback is a partner with several advocacy groups, including the Evergreen Mountain Bike Alliance, the Cascade Bicycle Club, Bikes Belong, TrailsforYouth.Org and the International Mountain Bike Association.

== Models ==
One of the innovations pioneered by Diamondback is the Knuckle Box suspension, which is found on its Sortie, Mission, and Scapegoat full suspension mountain bikes. Between 2013 and 2016, Diamondback developed a new trail bike platform called the Release. Using input from bicycle suspension expert Luther Beal and Diamondback team riders (notably Eric Porter), Diamondback developed its first ever patent-pending suspension called Level Link. The Level Link suspension is based on dual counter-rotating links in a similar fashion as Santa Cruz's Virtual Pivot Point suspension.

A number of different models and sizes are offered by the brand, which include the following:

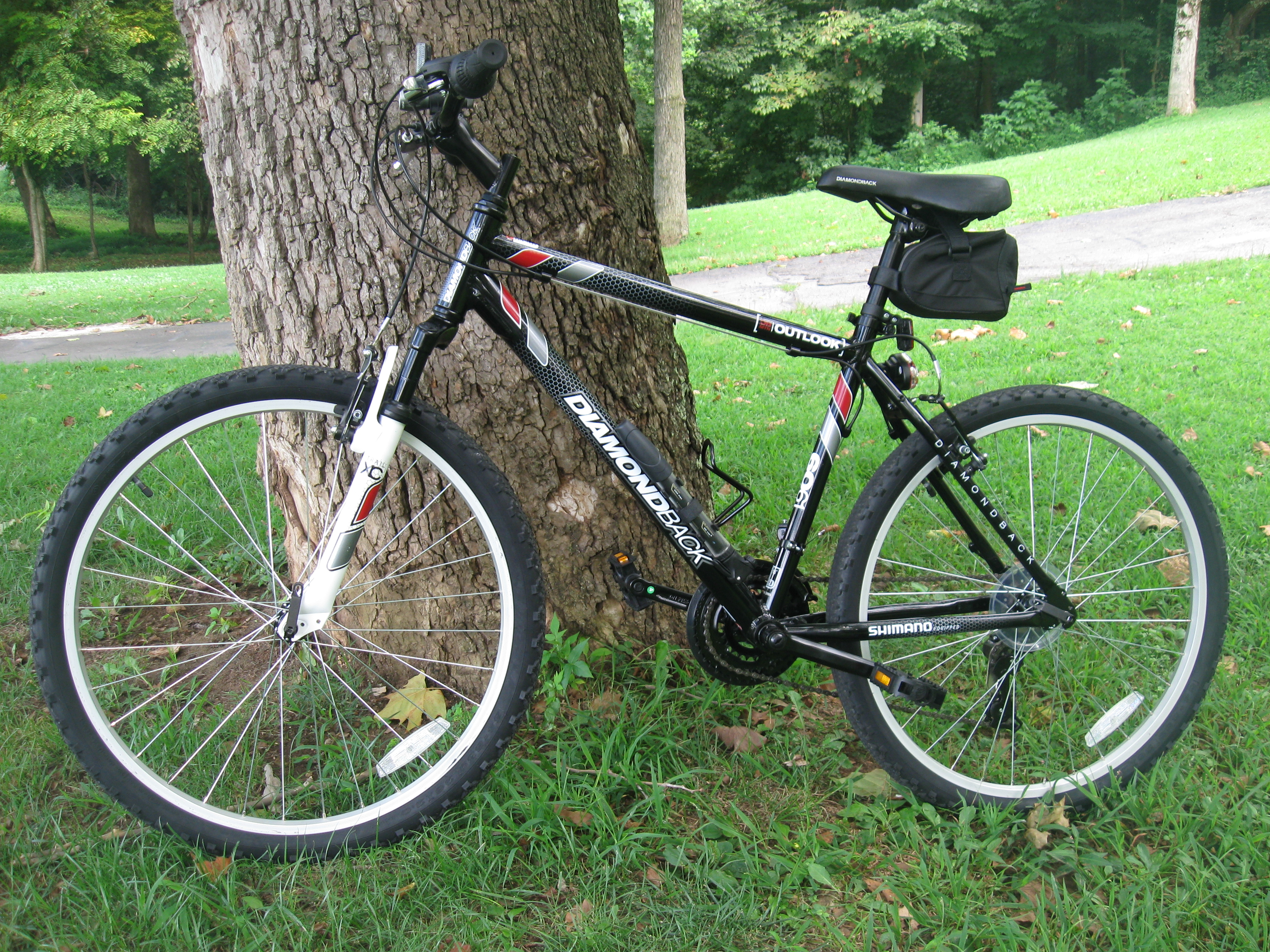
A 2011 model Diamondback Outlook, which is an entry-level hardtail mountain bike

- Full Suspension
- Mountain Hardtail
- Gravel
- Road
- Performance Hybrid
- Hybrid
- Dual Sport
- Women's
- Youth

== Early years BMX Models ==
Diamond Back were pioneers of BMX bikes in the early BMX years, a period that covered the late 1970s to the early/mid-1980s. At this time the model range included.

- MX
- Large Pro
- Pro range (Senior Pro, Medium Pro, Mini Pro)
- Silver Streak
- Harry Leary Turbo (HLT)
- Turbo Lite
- Formula 1
- Viper
- Super Viper
- Super Streak

The early MX bikes were produced in California, USA. By 1979 production moved to Japan between until 1984. In 1983 the lower specification bikes began production in Taiwan.
