= Gale Webb Extreme Sports and Air Shows =

Gale Webb Extreme Sports and Air Shows is an extreme sports show hosted by Gale Webb at events in southern California. Commonly referred to as "Gale's Extreme Air Show" or "Gale's Extreme Sports Show", the show can be seen at some fairs and carnivals, and is also performed at schools. A feature-length documentary was announced in 2024 on Gale Webb’s life and impact she has had on so many kids through her Gale Webb Extreme Sports Shows. The documentary is being produced and directed by filmmaker Billy Henrickle. Many pros who rode in Gale’s shows are a part of this inspirational film including Tony Hawk, Eddie Fiola, Christian Hosoi, and many more.

== Overview ==
Webb has been hosting her shows for over 30 years. Tony Hawk performed in her first show, and over the years it has gained popularity in California. It is a part of events like the Orange County Youth Expo and Boy Scouts of America's Scout-O-Rama. The show has several sponsors including Burnside Clothing, Hansen Natural, Sport Chalet, Freshpark, Kawasaki and Vans.

== The show ==
Gale Webb Extreme Sports and Air Shows use two truck-mounted portable ten-foot quarter pipes, occasionally with a steel funbox in the middle. Performers usually include professional BMX bikers, rollerbladers, skateboarders and scooter riders.

Before the show starts, the performers usually perform some of their most impressive stunts in order to gain attention. Once it is time for the show, Webb introduces each performer and has each of them do a few tricks. After that, the performers are free to take turns performing tricks, and gradually do more impressive ones as the show goes on. Most of the show is performed to loud rock music. During the performance, Webb throws items into the crowd and gives positive messages to children, including her mottoes such as "Never give up", "Say no to drugs" and "Get high on life".

Other events can happen within the show. Webb might challenge a performer to do a certain trick, or two performers might challenge each other. A rail might be placed on the funbox for performers to grind on, or a performer might try jumping over another or even all of the performers. Gale ends her show by awarding the most enthusiastic spectator with a skateboard deck or something else of fairly high value.

=== Notable professional appearances ===
- Tony Hawk
- Eddie Fiola
- Dakota Schuetz
- Drew Weaver (skateboarder)
