= Bob Haro =

American bicycle motocross racer

Personal information
- Full name: Bob Haro
- Nickname: The Godfather of freestyle
- Born: June 29, 1958 (age 68) Pasadena, California, U.S.

Cycling career
- Sport: Cycling
- Discipline: BMX freestyle
- Role: Professional BMX rider/company owner
- Rider type: Skatepark, Flatland, Vert, Ramp

Professional team
- –: Haro Bikes

Bob Haro (born June 29, 1958) is an American former (retired from active competition) professional freestyle BMX rider turned artist and business executive. He is the founder of Haro Bikes and was one of the most important early innovators of BMX freestyle.

== Early life ==
Haro was born in Pasadena but raised in San Diego, California. He is the oldest of four with sister Janice, brothers Scott and Ron raised by their father Robert Haro with Mexican roots and an American mother. Haro stated in an interview that his surname comes from the town of Haro in Spain. He began biking in his high school sophomore year when he ran out of money riding dirt bikes. His father bought him a Honda 100 and he stripped the bike down to compete in motorcycle races. He won over 50 motocross trophies by 1975.

Around 1976, he got into BMX biking by racing his brother's bike out behind a bike shop in San Diego. After moving to Stockton, California as a result of his parents' divorce, Bob really got started racing and riding for a sponsor for Molina's Bike Shop. He was one of a small group of BMX'ers in that town to perform many of the common tricks.

== Career ==
In 1978, Haro teamed up with R. L. Osborn to form the very first freestyle BMX team, which made its debut at ABA's Winternationals in Chandler, Arizona.

In 1981 Bob Haro and Bob Morales traveled on tour together performing shows all over the Midwest, Eastern United States, and parts of Canada to enthusiastic crowds. Also, in 1981, Haro was involved in the Steven Spielberg production of E.T. the Extra-Terrestrial as a stunt rider.

In 1981 Bob Haro designed the first frame and fork tailored to freestyle BMX. The frameset was manufactured by the bicycle company Torker and became commercially available in 1982 and was marketed as the Haro Freestyler.

He stopped riding in 1984 after four knee surgeries and, in 1987, he was inducted into the American Bicycle Association Hall Of Fame. In 1993 he founded his own company, Haro Design, Inc., a design and marketing company in Cardiff, California.

In 2012, as part of the London Olympic Games, Bob Haro choreographed the Dove bike sequence in the Opening ceremony.

== See also ==
- List of BMX bicycle manufacturers
