= Magna (bicycle company) =

American bicycle company

Magna Bicycle company
- insert a caption here
- Company type: Subsidiary
- Founder: Paul Anderson
- Headquarters: American Canyon, California
- Key people: John Bisges CEO
- Products: Bicycles
- Parent: Dynacraft
- Website: http://www.dynacraftwheels.com/

Magna is an American bicycle brand owned by Dynacraft BSC. Magna bikes are produced in China and are sold in American retail stores such as Target and Wal-Mart.

== Bicycles ==
Magna offers bicycles in many different colors and sizes from child to adult. The bikes are sold as affordable alternatives to higher end bikes.

== Models ==
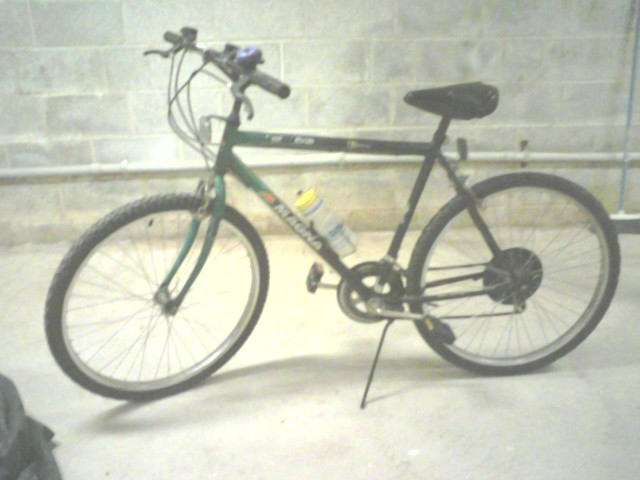
This is a Magna Great Divide mountain bike.

12"

- Lil Dreamer-3–5 years old
- Gravel Blaster—3–5 years old
- Wheelie-3-5 years old
- Bare Bones-3-5 years old

16"

- Stardom-4-8 years old
- Misfit-4-8 years old
- Starburst-4-8 years old
- Major Damage-4-8 years old
- Rattlesnake-4-8 years old
- Maui Miss-4-8 years old

18"

- Rip Tide-6-9 years old
- Inspire-6-9 years old

20"

- Throttle-6-10 years old
- Sapphire-6-10 years old
- Great Divide-6-10 years old
- Cliff Runner-6-10 years old
- Precious Pearls-6-10 years old
- Threat-6-10 years old
- Torrid-6-10 years old
- Rip Claw-6-10 years old
- Oasis-6-10 years old
- Busted-6-10 years old

24"

- Great Divide—Young Adults
- Outreach-Young Adults
- Northern Ridge-Young Adults
- Rip Curl-Young Adults

26"

- RX Pro- Young Adults and Adults
- Beaver Cruiser- Young Adults and Adults
- Wash Cruiser-Young Adults and Adults
- Cliff Runner-Young Adults and Adults
- Rip Curl-Young Adults and Adults
- Nantucket-Young Adults and Adults
- Waikiki-Young Adults and Adults
- Northern Ridge-Young Adults and Adults
- Washst-Young Adults and Adults
- Duck Cruiser-Young Adults and Adults
- Great Divide-Young Adults and Adults
- Boisests-Young Adults and Adults
- Outreach-Young Adults and Adults
- Oasis-Young Adults and Adults

28"

- 700C-Young Adults and Adults

== Issues ==
In 1999, Dynacraft voluntarily recalled about 3,000 Magna "Great Divide" 21 speed mountain bikes, sold in the 24-inch size for girls and boys, and the 26-inch size for women and men. The bikes could have defective handle bar stems which would not tighten sufficiently to lock onto the bicycles. This can cause the front wheel not to turn properly, resulting in serious injuries to the rider from falls. Dynacraft stated that is not aware of any injuries or incidents involving these bicycles. The bikes have a model number on the left side of the seat post. The girls' bikes have model number 8504-50 and are purple. The boys' bikes have model number 8504-51 and are blue. The women's bikes have model number 8547-84 and also are purple. The men's bikes have model number 8547-85 and are black. The words "Great Divide" are located on the cross-tubes of these bicycles and the word "KALLOY" is located on the handlebar stems. Fred Meyer Stores in Alaska, Arizona, Idaho, Oregon, Utah and Washington sold these bikes from December 1998 through August 18, 1999.
