= Hutch BMX =

American BMX bicycle manufacturer

Hutch hi-Performance inc.
- New logo for Hutch Hi-Performance
- Industry: Bicycles
- Predecessor: Hutch BMX
- Founded: 1979; 47 years ago in Pasadena, Maryland, U.S.
- Founder: Richard Hutchins
- Headquarters: United States
- Area served: Worldwide
- Products: Hutch Pro Racer
- Website: Hutch

Hutch BMX was founded in 1979 by bicycle store owner Richard Hutchins in Pasadena, Maryland. Hutch BMX grew from a bicycle shop to a mail order business, and then to a BMX bicycle manufacturer, who's higher end models were among the most expensive BMX bikes of the time.

== History ==
=== Hutch BMX mail order business ===
Hutch BMX started out as a bicycle shop. Shop owner Richard Hutchins noticed many young BMX enthusiasts wanted bike parts which were only available on the West Coast. Eventually there were so many mail order customers that Hutchins closed the bike shop and became a mail order company to sell full time.

=== Hutch BMX manufacturer ===
By 1980, when Hutchins wanted to transition his business from a mail-order shop to a bicycle manufacturer, he contracted Profile Racing and Speed Unlimited to build his first BMX frames. Profile build frames for Hutch for about a year and a half. Hutchins also soon used other outsourced builders like MCS and VDC.

In February 1981, Richard Hutchins acquired the rights to Titron Components, manufacturer of the first round cage BMX pedals (name Bear Trap), and hired its founder, Bill Grove, as the design engineer for Hutch Hi-Performance Products. Grove designed signature Hutch components including the legendary Deep-H stem, Western-H Freestyle stem, Aerospeed cranks. Changes to Grove's pedals were continually made and offered by Hutch, evolving from the Titron branded Bear Trap pedals into what eventually became the signature Hutch Pedals. Hutch's "Hutch Pedals" came in three models - Pro, Freestyle, and Mini (and although people often simply referred to them by the nickname bear trap, as they did other brands of bear trap shaped pedals, Hutch's never had the model name "Bear Trap"). Manufacturing of the components was outsourced to other dedicated machine shops and fabricators. Hutchins partnered with Profile Racing to produce the early Hutch 3-piece cranks.

In 1982, Hutch moved into a dedicated manufacturing facility, where it installed machinery including tube benders, automatic production jigs, polishing equipment, and CNC lathes, and began producing components such as frames, forks, handlebars, seat posts, and crank arms. Contemporary accounts indicate that Hutch employed more than 55 welders by 1983, although some frames continued to be produced by outside manufacturers. By 1983/1984, Hutch also being using Taiwan production for bikes, and as well as using components made by Japanese companies, such as Hutch Pedals being made by Sakae of Japan, Hutch wheels made by OGK, and other Japanese-sourced components.

Hutch sponsored some of the most talented riders in the sport, including Tim Judge, Rich Farside, Toby Henderson, and Mike Miranda. By 1985, Hutch began offering frames named “Judge” and “Hollywood”, named after Tim Judge and Mike “Hollywood” Miranda.

The Hutch brand name was purchased in 2008 by John de Bruin, and currently sells Hutch branded bicycles and components under the name Hutch Hi-Performance BMX.

== See also ==
- List of BMX bicycle manufacturers
