= TrailsforYouth.Org =

Trails for Youth.Org (TYO) is a non-profit organization based in Springfield, Virginia. Its mission is to provide opportunities for children to explore biking trails in and around Washington, D.C. The organization was founded in 2003 under the name of Trips for Kids Metro DC, operating three chapters of the trips for kids program. In 2010 the name was changed to Trails for Youth.Org. TYO has served thousands of youth in the D.C. area since 2003, providing safe, fun, physical activity and mentoring in a natural setting. Currently the main focus is on low income families and at-risk youth in the Northern Virginia community of Springfield. For example, the organization takes kids into Lake Accotink Park in Fairfax, VA, where mountain bikes are provided for exercise and fun. Since its inception, the organization has provided over 10,000 opportunities for adventure.

In 2012 TrailsforYouth.Org celebrated their 10th year as an award-winning children's health organization.

In 2015, Diamondback Bicycles partnered with the organization in a multi-year agreement to provide new equipment to replace the aging equipment used by the organization.
