= Pump track =

Type of cycling circuit

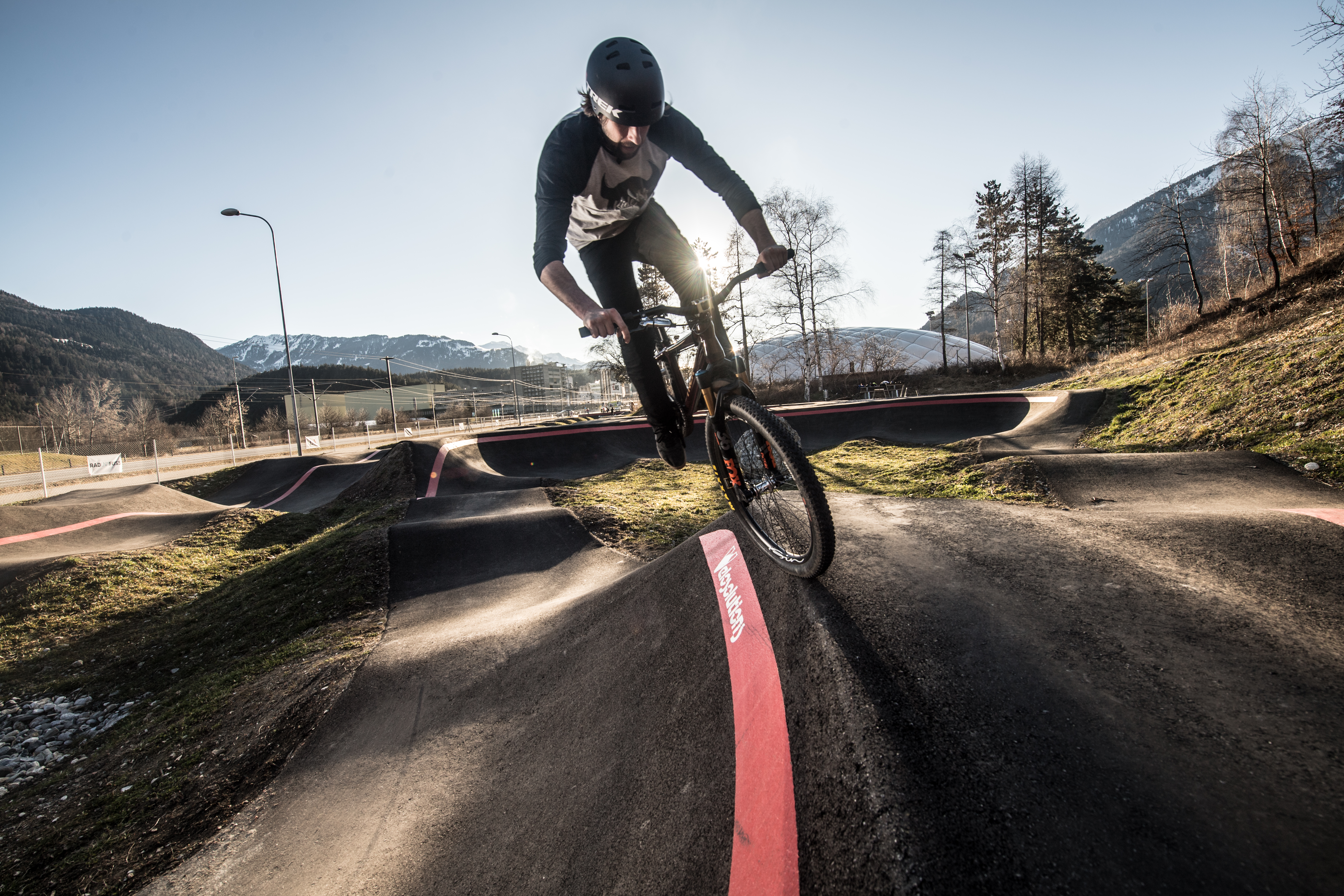
A mountain bike rider doing a trick on a pump track

A pump track is a purpose-built track for cycling. It has a circuit of rollers, (Note: Rollers are small tabletops that give riders extra speed by "pumping" the jump.) banked turns and features designed to be ridden completely by riders "pumping"—generating momentum by up and down body movements, thereby pitching the bicycle, instead of pedaling or pushing. It was originally designed for the mountain bike and BMX scene, and now, due to concrete and/or asphalt constructions, is also used for skateboarding, and is accessible to wheelchairs. Pump tracks are relatively simple to use and cheap to construct, and cater to a wide variety of rider skill levels.

Pump track in Werbach, Germany

== History ==
Skateparks experienced a boom in the late 1990s and early 2000s. However, most of them were designed to be used by experienced or professional riders, and thus resulted in some injuries. The first new-era pump track in the United States was built in 2004 at The Fix Bike Shop in Boulder, Colorado, by professional downhill bicyclist Steve Wentz.

== Track design ==
Most pump tracks link a series of rollers to steeply bermed corners that bring the riders back around. At first, they were built mostly out of dirt, and later concrete or asphalt. Paved pump tracks also have the advantage that they can be ridden by skateboarders, in-line skaters, and foot-powered scooters. The size can vary from 50 m^{2} to over 8000 m^{2}.

== Bikes ==
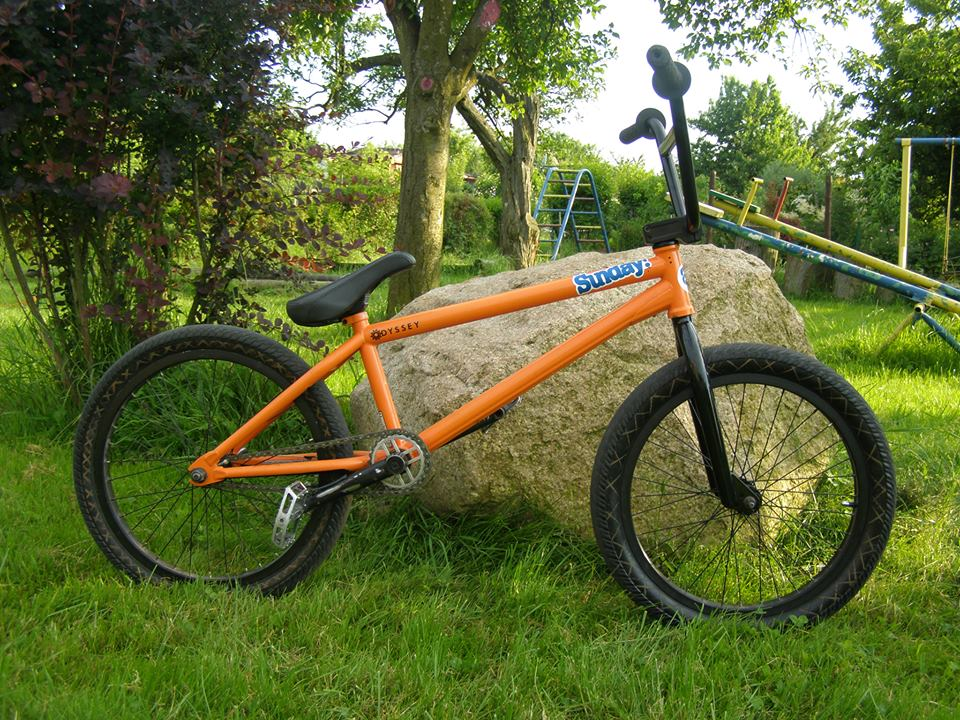
One of the bike types that can be used on a pump track

Since momentum, or speed, is gained by the rider pumping, such as on the down-slope of each roller, the best bikes to use have no suspension, which would absorb useful energy. Bikes usually have a rigid frame, such as BMX bikes, which most efficiently convert the rider's motions into forward thrust. Some bikes are custom-built for a pump track, with features such as an offset crank, which stabilizes the pedals, and lowers the rider's center of gravity.

== World Championship ==
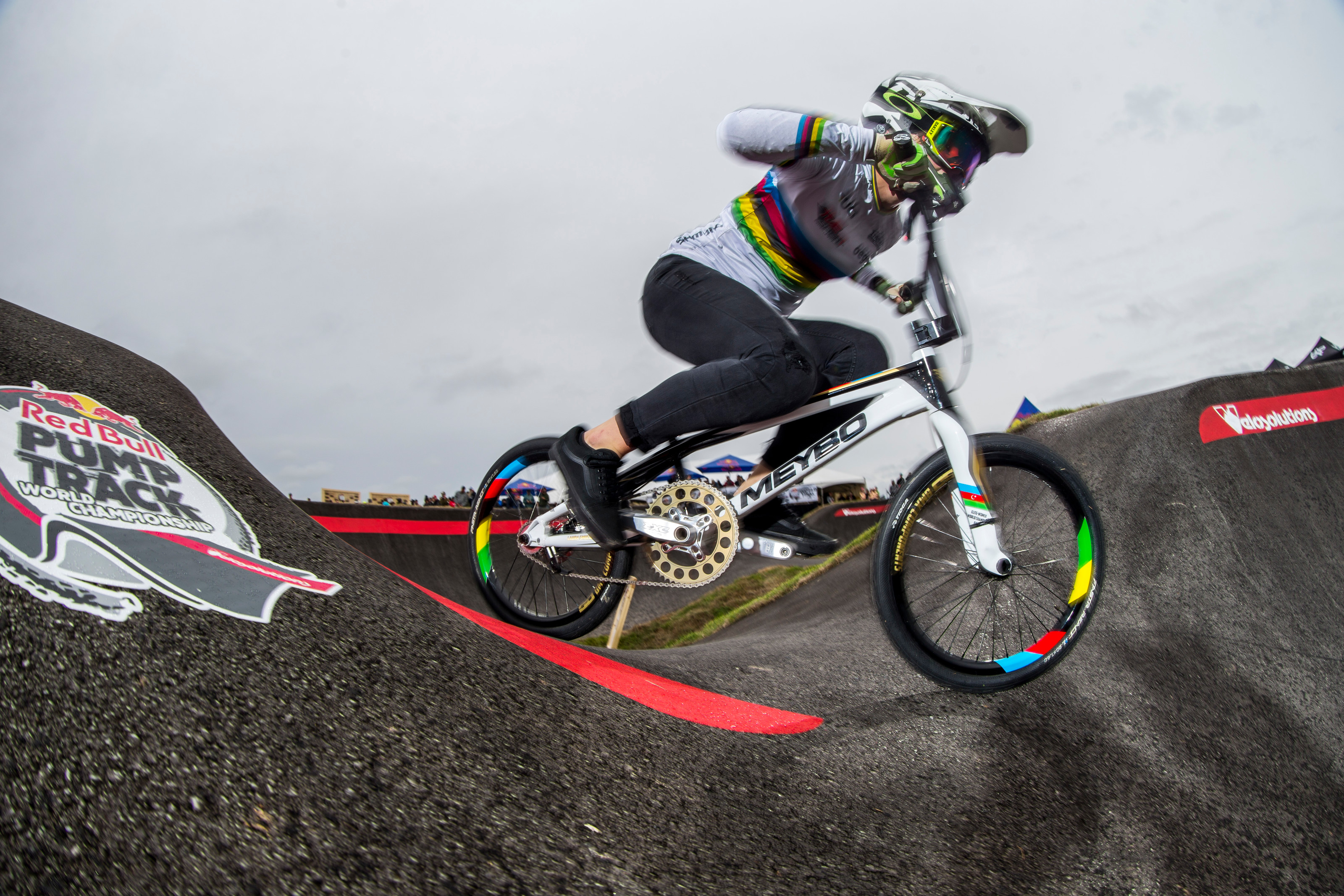
Participant at the world final in Springdale, Arkansas, US

In 2018, Velosolutions with Red Bull organized a pump track world championship. 67 riders from BMX and MTB raced at a world final in Arkansas. David Graf and Christa von Niederhäusern, both from Switzerland, were crowned the first Red Bull Pump Track World Champions. The series continued in 2019, with 26 international stops. At the same time as the 2009 UCI World Mountain Bike Championships in Canberra, Australia, a Pump Track World Championships was held.

== See also ==
- BMX
- Dirt jumping
- Single track
- Glossary of cycling
