= GT Bicycles =

Company

GT Bicycles, Inc.
- Type: Subsidiary
- Industry: Bicycles
- Founded: 1972; 54 years ago in Santa Ana, California
- Founder: Gary Turner, Richard Long
- Products: BMX, mountain, road bicycles & bicycle parts
- Parent: Pon Holdings
- Website: gtbicycles.com

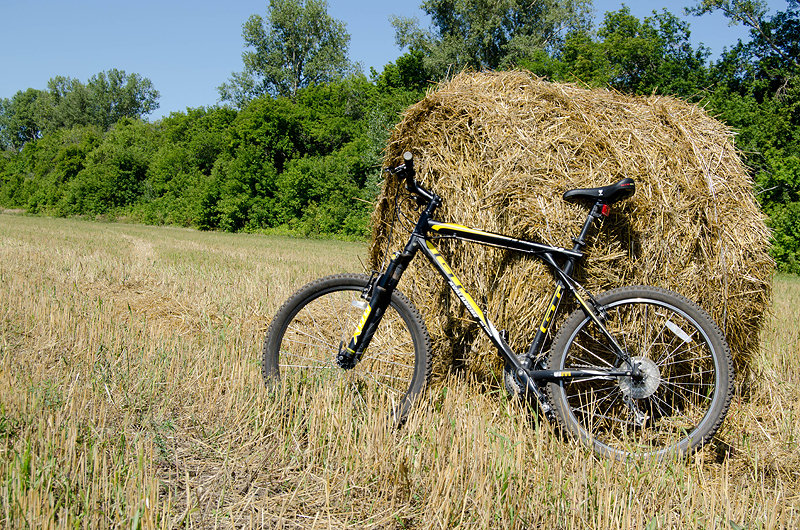
GT Avalanche 1.0

GT Bicycles, Inc. is an American company that designed and manufactured BMX, mountain, and road bicycles. GT was a division of the Dutch conglomerate Pon Holdings, which also markets Cannondale, Schwinn, Mongoose, IronHorse, DYNO, and RoadMaster bicycle brands; all manufactured in Asia.

GT was founded in 1972, by Gary Turner and Richard Long in Santa Ana, California, and was noted at its inception for spearheading the prominence of BMX bicycles, later for developing a range of bikes around its "triple triangle" design, and at the end of its independent history, winning a commission to manufacture a $30,000 carbon fiber "Superbike" for the 1996 Summer games. GT sponsored numerous race teams and individuals, including noted riders Rebecca Twigg and Juli Furtado.

In 1998, the company went public and subsequently merged with Questor Partners, then owner of Schwinn. The conglomerate went bankrupt in 2001 and was acquired by Pacific Cycle, which was in turn acquired by Dorel Industries in 2004.

On October 11, 2021, Dorel Industries sold their entire bike division to Pon Holdings for $810 million. This includes GT, Schwinn, Mongoose among other brands.

On December 18, 2024, GT announced that it will pause releasing new products and work to sell off current bicycle stock in 2025. Pon Holdings does not have plans to sell the rights to the GT brand name.

== Company history ==
=== Origins ===
In 1972, professional drag racer and experienced welder Gary Turner built a bicycle frame for his son Craig Turner in his Fullerton, California garage to race at the BMX track. Most frames used during this period were modified Schwinn Stingrays which were heavy and broke easily under the stress of BMX racing and jumping. Gary Turner made his frames from 4130 chrome-moly tubing, the same tubing used in building chassis for dragsters which is stronger and lighter than regular carbon steel. Craig's bike was noticed at the BMX track, and Gary soon began making frames for other kids.

In 1976, Gary Turner began producing frames for Pedals Ready, a Pro Shop at the Western Sports-A-Rama BMX track in Orange County, California, named and marketed as Pedals Ready/GT. These were the first commercially distributed frames by Turner, and one of the first sponsored riders to use them was Greg A. Hill, whose father owned the Pedals Ready bike shop. Aware of the popularity of Gary Turner's BMX frames, Richard Long contacted Turner in 1977 about supplying his Anaheim, California bicycle shop. Turner agreed and the foundation of GT Bicycles was born. These early frames did not possess the GT brand and were simply called "Gary Turner", as seen by the frame stickers. Things happened fast and soon Richard and Gary invested in a manufacturing warehouse dedicated to making top quality Cro-moly BMX frames in Santa Ana, California. In 1979 they incorporated into GT Bicycles, Inc. GT standing for the initials of its founder, Gary Turner. Richard sold his bike shop and began selling frames as fast as possible to bicycle distributors across the US and into Europe. Richard headed the business and marketing aspects of the company while Gary was the engineer and production head.

=== GT Bicycles Inc. ===
In 1980, GT Bicycles Inc. released their first complete bike, the GT Pro, and began to sponsor BMX racers such as Lee Medlin and Denny Davidow. GT's first magazine ad appeared in Bicycle Motocross Action (BMX Action) in the January 1980 issue.

For the 1981 season, GT released five models: Junior, Expert, 24, 26 and Pro. The models would stay this way until 1984, when their first freestyle bike was released, the Pro Performer.

In 1983, GT signed freestyle BMX riders Bob Morales and Eddie Fiola to design and eventually ride a new freestyle bike the Pro Performer. At the time, the Performer was the only other dedicated freestyle bike besides the Haro Freestyler. The unique bent down tube became a trademark look for GT. Bob Morales eventually left GT to focus on his own company DYNO Designs while Eddie Fiola continued as a famous BMX personality of the 1980s until his contract was not renewed in 1987.

In 1985, GT bought BMX accessories and apparel company Dyno. Bob Morales said "GT Bicycles made an offer to buy Dyno. I accepted their offer because Dyno was severely under-capitalized and in need of investment. I negotiated a contract with GT to design bicycle frames and components and to consult on a marketing strategy for them." Morales developed a line of Dyno frames and bicycles for GT. Dyno also produced a line of clothing apparel and shoes under the Dyno brand. 1985 also saw GT produce their first Mountain bike for the emerging sport and market.

Robinson Racing was acquired by GT Bicycles in 1987 from founder Chuck Robinson due to financial troubles with the company. Chuck went to work for GT and did promotion for them as well as heading up the South America sales because he spoke Spanish as well as other languages. Robinson Racing was founded in the late 1970s after Chuck worked for DG BMX and Webco Bikes Inc.

In 1989, GT Bicycles acquired Auburn Cycles, another company that Bob Morales started along with Todd Huffman only one year earlier. Originally, Auburn was going to be Honda Cycles but the Honda Motor Corp. pulled out at the last minute, declining to license the name. Bob and Todd continued with the project and Huffman came up with the Auburn name with Bob designing the original logo. When Auburn merged into GT, Huffman was hired by GT to manage the brand in addition to his Marketing Director title. GT produced Auburn frames and bicycles until 1997.

The same year, GT acquired Powerlite. Powerlite was founded in 1977 by Steve Rink in Orange County, California as a frame for the Peddlepower bike shop called the Peddlepower SR. In early 1979, this would change and the decals would read Powerlite. The company name was resurrected as an independent in 2002 as Powerlite Bicycles USA, which produces BMX racing bikes and accessories.

=== Ownership change and public offering ===
With lost public interest in the sport of BMX and declining sales, Long and Turner sold a controlling interest to Boston-based investment firm Bain Capital in 1993, which then took the company public in October 1995.

In 1996, GT won the commission to manufacture a highly aerodynamic bike design that would later become known as the "Superbike" and later banned by Olympic regulations. A byproduct of a year-long development program with the U.S. national team known as Project '96, the bike featured a carbon graphite frame with no top tube, extremely thin seat and downtubes, a seat tube with a deep cutout to accommodate the rear wheel, as well as differently sized aerodynamic wheels. Describing the bike, the U.S. Cycling Federation's track endurance coach Craig Griffin said "it's so thin and light, and it's as strong as anything built. It's so aerodynamic that when you look at it from the front, it disappears." Controversially, just prior to the 1996 Summer Olympics, Rebecca Twigg quit the team, citing her Superbike's ill fit as one of the reasons for departing.

On October 11, 1996, GT announced that it had reached an agreement with Nike whereby Nike would be an official sponsor for all of GT's bicycle racing teams in 1997. Under the new agreement, all GT team athletes would use Nike shoes and after-race apparel. This new sponsorship agreement represented an expansion of Nike's current sponsorship as the official shoe of the GT mountain bike team by then CEO Michael Haynes. GT Bicycles had the first and the only mountain bike and BMX teams that are sponsored by Nike. GT had a total of 57 athletes on various teams in 1997, including nine mountain bike racers, 32 BMX racers and 16 freestyle/GT Bicycle Air Show performers. A week before GT's debut at the 1996 Summer Olympics, GT co-founder Richard Long was killed on July 12 in a motorcycle accident on his Honda Valkyrie en route to a national championship series race for the National Off-Road Bicycle Association at Big Bear Lake in the San Bernardino mountains.

At the time of Long's death, GT maintained an office at the factory in Santa Ana as well as a factory in Huntington Beach — and manufactured 600,000 bicycles annually under the GT, Powerlite, Robinson and Dyno brands, distributed bikes, parts and accessories via its Riteway network and had annual revenues of $150 million.

Less than two years after Long's death, in 1998, Bain Capital sold GT to another investment group, Questor Partners, which at the time also owned Schwinn, for $175 million. Nearly five years to the day that Richard Long had died, Questor would file for bankruptcy on June 27, 2001, and was acquired by Pacific Cycle, which was in turn acquired by Canadian company Dorel Industries in 2004, and subsequently acquired by Pon Holdings in 2021. In 2001 GT stopped production of Robinson BMX bikes and after the 2004 sale to Dorel industries the Dyno brand stopped production.

=== Return to California ===
On February 21, 2023, GT Bicycles announced the return to its roots with a relocation of the headquarters to Aliso Viejo, California and once again becoming a stand-alone company while still being part of Pon Holdings.

== Teams ==
As well as the manufacturing of bicycles, GT Bikes sponsored several teams competing in BMX, mountain and road competitions.

=== BMX Racing Team ===
Kye Whyte from Great Britain is the only current factory GT rider. He won a silver medal at the 2020 Tokyo Olympics and a silver at the 2022 World Championships.

In December 2024, GT released their entire BMX racing team from sponsorship.

=== BMX Freestyle Team ===
GT Bike's current Freestyle Team includes the riders: Izzy Aleman, Jill Alvarez, Sven Avemaria, Gustavo Balaloka, Emma Bornios, Mia Bornios, Dan Conway, Tristen Cooper, Michael Dickson, Bethany Hedrick, Tom Justice, Brian Kachinsky, Shane Leeper, Ratty Matty, Albert Mercado, Julian Molina, Leandro Moreira, Justine 'Curly' Nieves, Duda Penso, Jeff Purdy, Mason Ritter, Justin Shorty, Dave Voelker, Chelsea Wolf and the Se7en Crew.

Along with Team Haro, Team GT helped shape the future of BMX Freestyle and helped pioneer a sport once deemed nothing more than a fad. GT produced some of the first Freestyle specific bikes in their early Pro Performer and World Tour models. Later highly successful models were the Pro Freestyle Tour, which saw the first use of mountain bike style brake mounts for use of Dia-Compe 990, the Dyno Pro Compe - one of the most ridden flatland frames of the early Nineties. GT was also there for the birth of street riding in the late Eighties with the GT Aggressor (Designed in California, but frames made in Taiwan) and Dyno Slammer bashguard models. GT also designed and sold the first flatland specific bike in the USA: the GT Show.

The GT BMX brand and team riders appear in the 'HellTrack' starting lineup scene in the BMX cult-classic film Rad. Famous names from the ranks of Teams past include X-Games Champions Dave Mirra, Jay Miron, Jamie Bestwick, along with pioneers Eddie 'King of the Skateparks' Fiola, Brian 'Rad Dad' Scura inventor of the Gyro, aka SST Oryg, Trevor Meyer, Joey 'Phenom' Phee, Martin 'The Chairman' Aparijo, Josh 'Dr. Air' White, Dino DeLuca, Dave Voelker, Brett Hernandez, Kevin Jones, Mark Eaton, Gary Pollak, Kevin 'The Gute' Gutierrez, Ruben Castillo, Robert Castillo, Jason Geoffery, Terryll Loffler, Bill Neuman, Goro Tamai, Krys Dauchy, and Adam Jung.

In December 2024, GT released their entire BMX racing team from sponsorship.

=== Mountain Team ===
Eight riders in the Mountain Team, compete in global competitions including downhill, four-cross, trials, freeride and dirt jumping. The riders in the team are: Marc Beaumont, Hans Rey, Eric Carter, Roger Rinderknecht, Kevin Aiello, and Tyler McCaul. In 2012, GT added Kyle Strait, Dan Atherton, Gee Atherton, and Rachel Atherton to the team.

Hans Rey has been sponsored by GT since 1987.

=== Road Team ===
GT Bikes briefly served as team sponsors and bike supplier for Jelly Belly professional cycling team. After the 2009 season, the team ended their relationship with GT and began riding Focus bikes. Lotto pro cycling team (now Lotto-Belisol) at one time had Easton aluminium tubing GT frames. The team now rides on Ridley carbon frames.

=== Co – Factory Team ===
The Co – Factory Team was founded in 2008. The team is composed of riders from across the US riding for local dealer teams that represent GT Bicycles.

=== Notable past Factory Team members ===
BMX Racing

- Lee Medlin (1978–80)
- Greg Hill (1981–83, Robinson 1986–91)
- Andy Patterson (1979–81)
- Geoff Scofield
- Robert Fehd
- Tommy Brackens (1984–86)
- Gary Ellis (1986–98)
- In Hee Lee
- Cindy Davis
- Corine Dorland
- Dale Holmes
- Jeremy McGrath
- Danny Nelson (1983–86, 1991–92, 2000–01, Robinson 1987–91, Powerlite 1992–2000)
- Mike King (1994–98)
- "Chicken" George Seevers
- Alexis Vergara
- Terry Tenette (1986–87)
- Randy Stumpfhauser (Powerlite 1993–95, GT 2004–08)
- Thomas Allier (1999–01, 2003–06)
- Mike Luna

BMX Freestyle

- Eddie Fiola (1983–87)
- Bob Morales
- Ron Wilkerson (1984)
- Martin Aparijo (1985–89)
- Brian Scura
- Dino Deluca (Dyno)
- Josh White (1986–88)
- Gary Pollak
- Dave Voelker (Dyno 1987–2002, GT 2023–Present)
- Joe Johnson
- Kevin Jones (1989)
- Brian Blyther (1990)
- Trevor Meyer
- Dave Mirra (Dyno 1989–92)
- Jay Miron
- Jamie Bestwick
- Rick Webb
- Gabe Weed
- Joey Phee (GT 1997-2003)
- Ruben Castillo
- Woody Itson (GT Manager)
- Robert Castillo
- Robert Smart
- Josh Heino
- Jason Brown

Mountain Bike

- Eric Carter
- Brian Lopes
- Hans Rey (1987–2025)

== See also ==
- GT Factory Racing, aka Atherton Racing
- List of BMX bicycle manufacturers
