= Torker =

American bicycle and unicycle brand

- Industry: Bicycle
- Founded: 1974 California
- Headquarters: Apple Valley, CA
- Parent: Supercross BMX
- Website: torkerracing.com

Torker is a brand of bicycles owned by Supercross BMX, headquartered in Apple Valley, CA.

== History ==
The Torker name was created by Johnson Engineering in Fullerton, California in 1977 for a BMX bike frame. The first Haro bikes were made by Torker. In 1982, Torker let go Bob Haro when he introduced his own line of BMX racing pants. In 1984, the Torker Bicycle Company went bankrupt, and Seattle Bike Supply purchased the name. BMX bikes with the Torker name were made from the late 1970s into the 2000s. Torker's product line expanded to include beach cruisers, tandem bikes and even unicycles. Reader's Digest nominated Torker unicycles as "America's 100 Best" for 2006, and Torker was awarded BEST OF 2006 in the December issue of Seattle Magazine. Seattle Bike Supply was acquired by Accell in 2006. Supercross BMX began the process of acquiring the Torker brand name in 2015. In 2024, the new Torker brand launched paying tribute to the original brand when run by Johnson Engineering. They've gone on to produce high-quality tributes to original Torker bicycles, such as the LP race frame and the Barbarian 26 inch cruiser.

== BMX team ==
Torker sponsored a BMX racing team that included:

- Mike Miranda
- Richie Anderson
- Tommy Brackens
- Clint Miller
- Eddy King
- Matt Hadan
- Steve Veltman
- Mike King
- Cheri Elliott

== Products ==
The Torker line includes formerly included unicycles, strollers, and trailers. Today's Torker just makes BMX bicycles and components. The bicycles include adult (men's and women's), children, tandem, and cruisers.
