= Redline (bicycle brand) =

BMX bike manufacturer

Redline Bicycles
- Logo for Redline
- Industry: Bicycles
- Predecessor: Redline BMX
- Founded: 1970; 56 years ago in Chatsworth, California, U.S.
- Founder: Linn Kastan; Mike Konle
- Headquarters: Kent, Washington, United States
- Area served: Worldwide
- Products: Redline
- Website: Redline

Redline Bicycles is an American company offering BMX, freestyle, cyclocross, mountain (MTB), and road bicycles and components. It is currently owned and operated by Regent, L.P. It also owns and operates a clothing line and five race teams. Redline is predominantly known for its long heritage in BMX racing. It is often referred to as the original BMX bicycle manufacturer having innovated many revolutionary components for the sport such as tubular chromoly forks and cranks.

== History ==
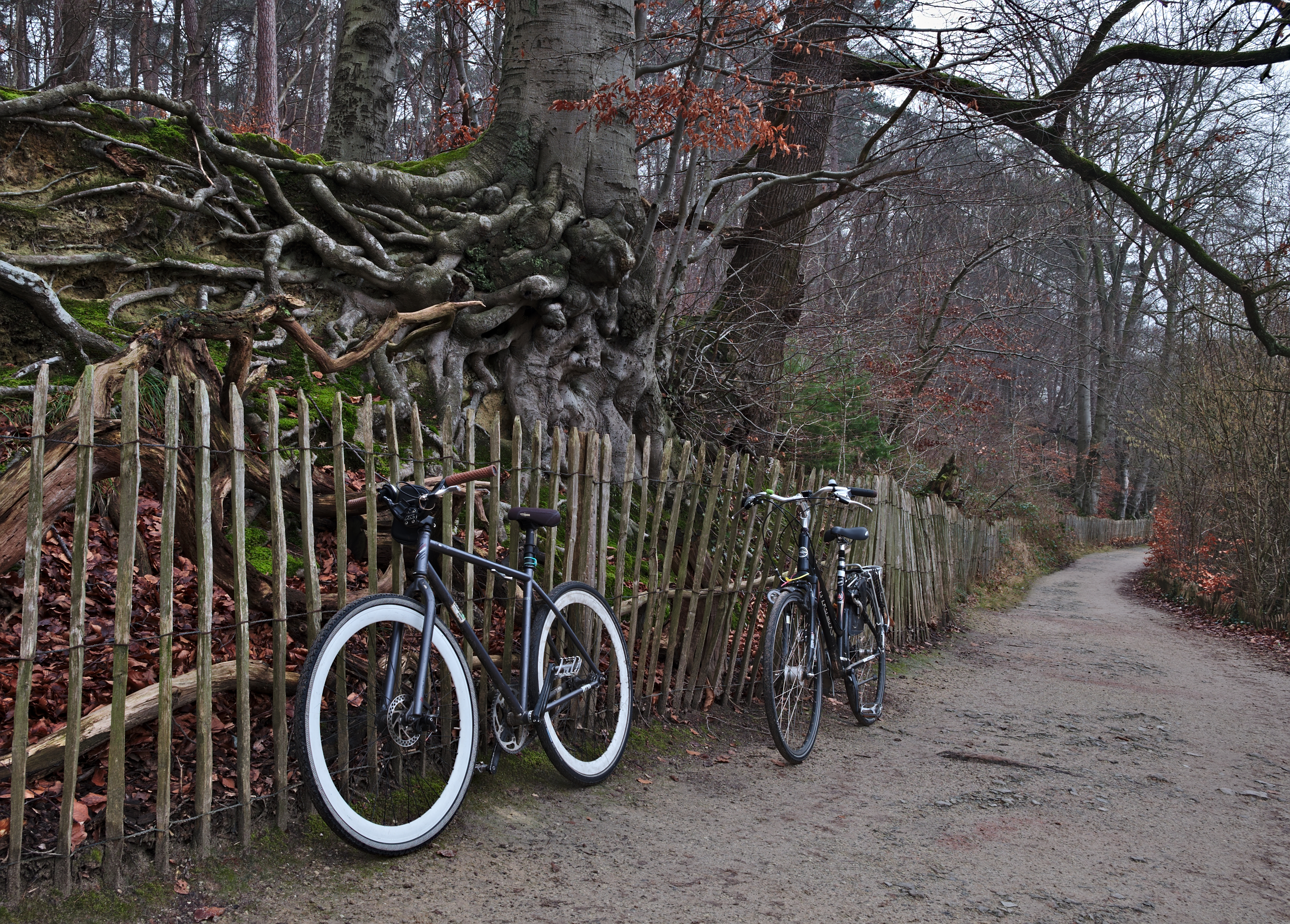
Redline Urbis bicycle (foreground)

Redline Racing Frames was founded in 1970 by Linn Kastan and Mike Konle in Chatsworth, California, making chromoly motorcycle frames and swingarms. The company had a staff of six and was receiving much success with their motorcycle swingarms. In 1973 Kastan decided he would weld a bicycle frame for his son as a Christmas gift. His son raced that bike under his father's company name Redline. The bike was noticed by a company called Pedalers West and they challenged Kastan to come up with a stronger and lighter fork specifically for 20 inch BMX racing. Kastan accepted the challenge. In February 1974 the first pairs of tubular chromoly forks were being produced. They were an instant success and became a favorite amongst racers. Later that year Redline released its first chromoly frame, the Squareback. Due to the high price at the time of $85 the sales were dismal. In 1977 Kastan and Konle agreed to go separate ways and Kastan would take over full ownership of Redline Racing Frames and Konle would carry on with the motorcycle side renaming his company Champion. By this time Kastan had designed and was releasing the Proline, their first official Team Model frame and fork. Soon after the famous V-Bars handlebars, the MXII frame and the Microline frame (mini series) were released. With these additions the company was gaining success again and by January 1980, Redline Flight cranks were going into production. They would be BMX's first tubular chromoly three piece cranks which would become Redline's most popular product.

In 1982 Redline introduced the Proline II, the MXIII series and expanded their line with the PL-20 and the PL-24. The PL-24 would be their first BMX bike with 24 inch wheels, commonly known as a cruiser. In 1983, they expanded further into the freestyle market with the RL-20 Prostyler. Not an instant hit but it would later gain popularity with the RL-20II in 1985. 1985 was arguably the height of Kastan's success with Redline. During the next three years, they would continue to further develop these models with many variations.

In 1988 Kastan sold Redline to Seattle Bike Supply (SBS) and they relocated the company to Kent, Washington. The company produced its first mountain bike in 1989 and changed its colors to pink, white, and black. They went on to manufacture road bicycles in the early 1990s and would eventually change the colors back to the original red, black, and white in 1993. Kastan went on in 1988 with his new BMX company which he named Kastan.

Seattle Bike Supply was acquired by Accell in 2006. Regent acquired Redline from Accell in 2019.

== See also ==
- List of BMX bicycle manufacturers
