= Hans Rey =

German mountain bike trials rider

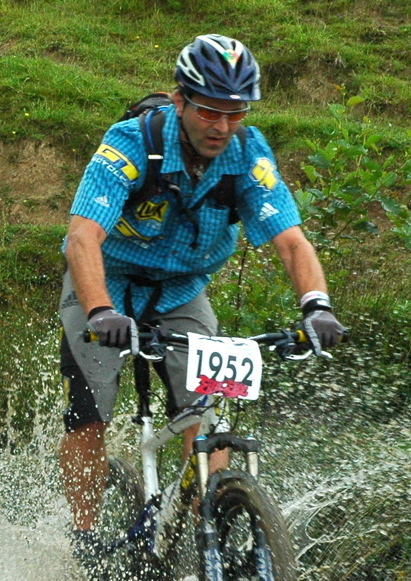
Hans Rey

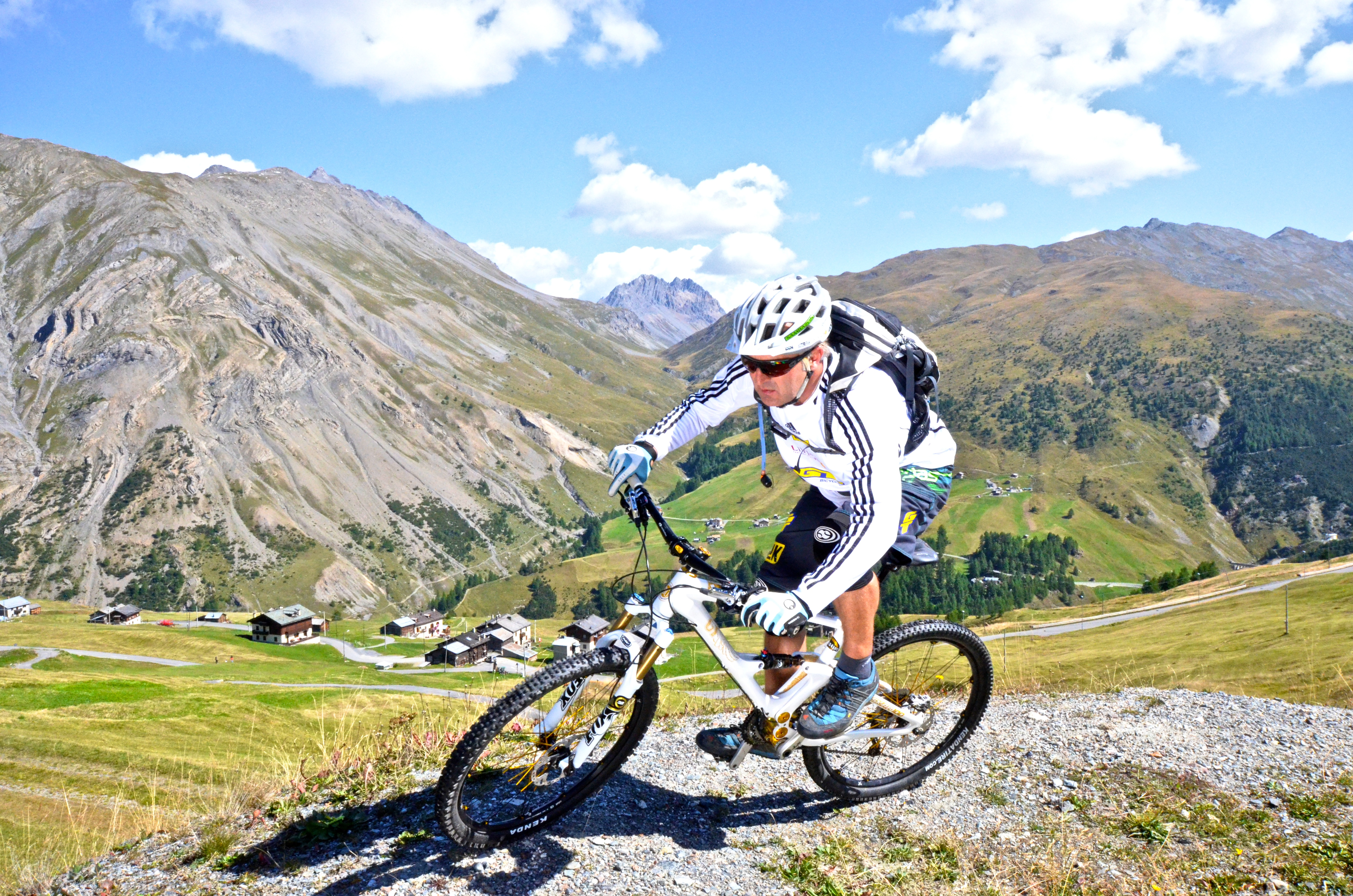
Hans Rey Italian Alps, Livigno

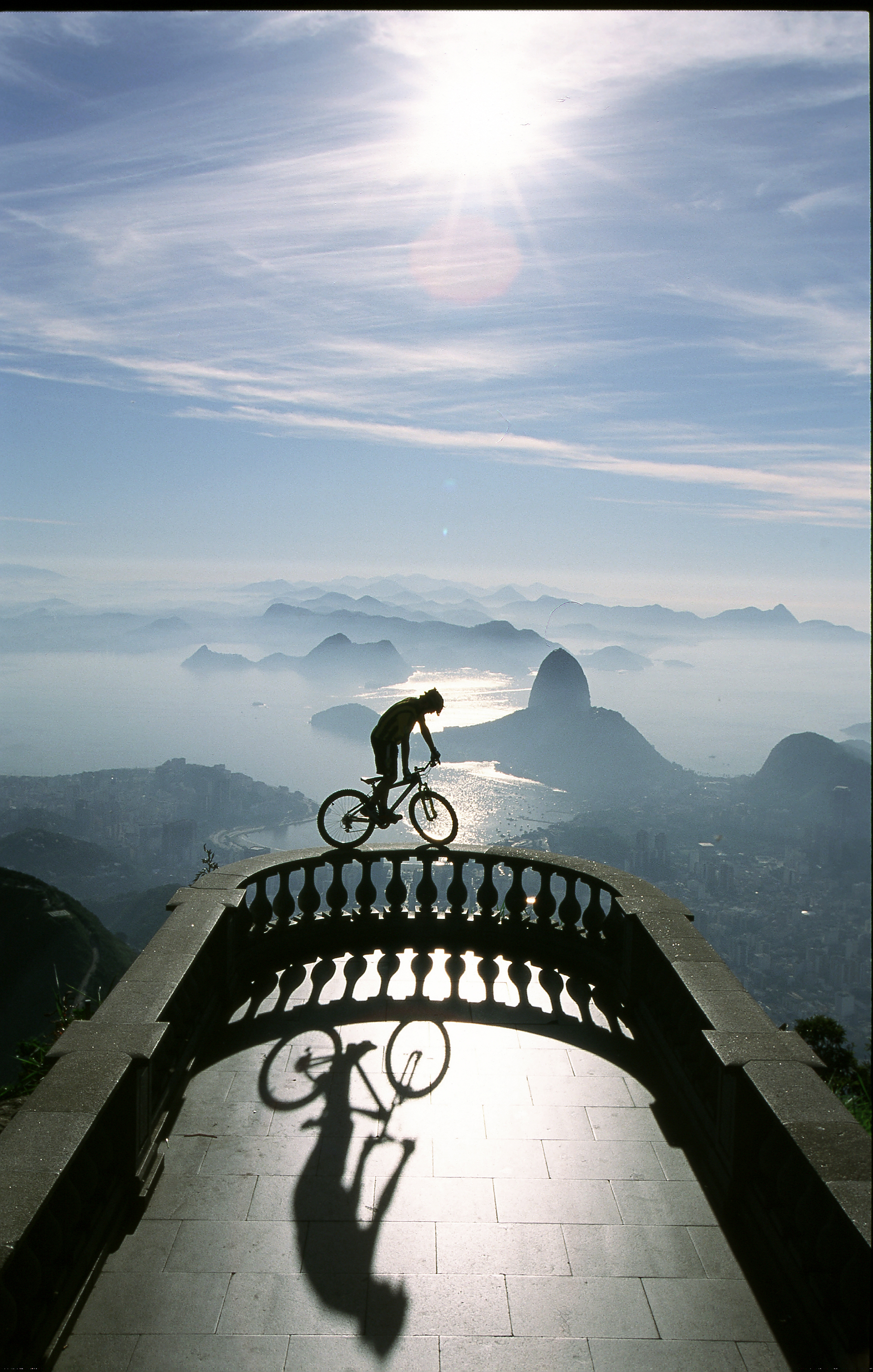
Hans Rey Brazil

Hansjörg Rey, aka Hans "No Way" Rey (born 4 June 1966) is a pioneer in mountain bike trials and extreme mountain biking also known as Freeride /"Freeriding". Rey began riding in the late 1970's, since 1987, he has ridden exclusively on GT bikes. In 1999, he was inducted to the Mountain Bike Hall of Fame.

Hans Rey, born and raised in Emmendingen, Germany; is a citizen of Switzerland and, since 2008, he is also a US citizen. He lives in Laguna Beach California with his wife Carmen.

== Career ==
Over the years he has won a large number of bike trials riding championships, including German, Swiss and USA National Champion, NORBA World Champ, Winner of the UCI World Champs, and Bike Trial Union Vice World Champ, Bronze Medal MTB Slalom Worlds, and X Games Silver Medal winner in the Trials in 1995 when the X Games were known as the ESPN Extreme Games; but since 1997, has retired from competitive sports to explore the world on his mountain bike adventures.

He is the only permanent member of the "Hans Rey Adventure Team", a quest to explore the world using his mountain bike talent always in search of something historical or mysterious. These trips are often filmed for television and the stories have been published in magazines all over the world. He has traveled to over 70 countries and has been featured on approx. 400 magazine covers. He has done a first descent on bikes of Mount Kenya, traversed the Sinai Desert in the footsteps of Moses, created the No Way Transalp route, searched for headhunters in Borneo, ridden the Inca Trail to Machu Picchu, ridden the Roop Kund trek in the Indian Himalayas, Bike Safari in Botswana, circumnavigation of Mount Kilimanjaro, Rubicon Trail in California, searched for the mysterious Dropa tribe in China, Wadi Rum Desert in Jordan, Cuba's Sierra Maestra Mountains, Annapurna Trek in Nepal, Copper Canyon Mexico, 5 volcanos in 5 days in Ecuador, Haute Route in France/Switzerland and many more glaciers, volcanos and treks. In 2016 Rey climbed and rode Mount Kenya and Mount Kilimanjaro back to back.

In 2017 Rey started his "Urban Adventure" series with his "TransAngeles" project, a 5-day ride across Los Angeles. Followed by TransNapoli, TransHongKong and in Oct.21 w 'Slay The Bay' in San Francisco. Most of his adventure documentaries are featured on his YouTube Channel.

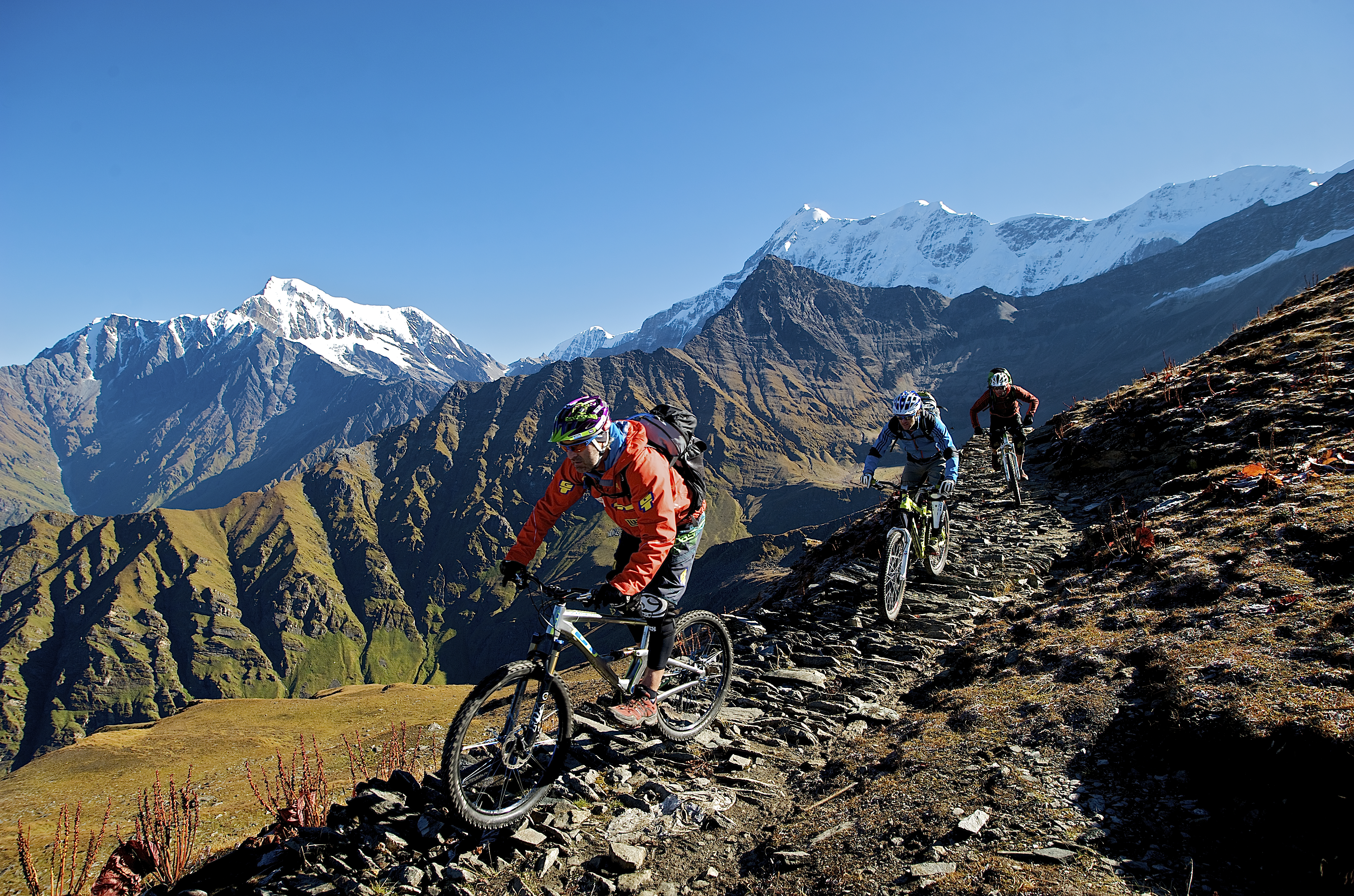
India Roop Kund Trek Himalayas

Rey made a name for himself with a number of publicity stunts on this bike, like a photoshoot in gridlock traffic on the 405 Freeway near Los Angeles on top of car, bungy jumps with his bike, his wild ride on ropes down a 14-story skyscraper in New Zealand, his ride along the 600 ft. high ledge at the Cliffs of Moher and his bike dance on the volcano in Hawaii surrounded by hot lava on the edge of a boiling ocean.

Hans was one of the first to produce action videos of his trials biking and extreme biking skills, including his own VHS series from 1992 to 1996: "Hans No Way Rey", "Level Vibes", Monkey See - Monkey Do" and "Big Five". He has also starred in movies like Tread (1994), and made guest appearances and stunt work on the TV series Pacific Blue (1995-1998). He was also part of the closing ceremony of the 1996 Olympic Games, appeared in Willy Bogner's Fire, Ice and Dynamite and White Magic films.

In 2005 Hans Rey founded Wheels4Life, a non-profit charity that provides bicycles to people in Developing Countries in need of transportation. By 2021 over 15,000 bicycles had been given to students, healthcare workers and farmers in 32 countries. Hans and his wife Carmen run the charity as volunteers along with supporters from around the world.

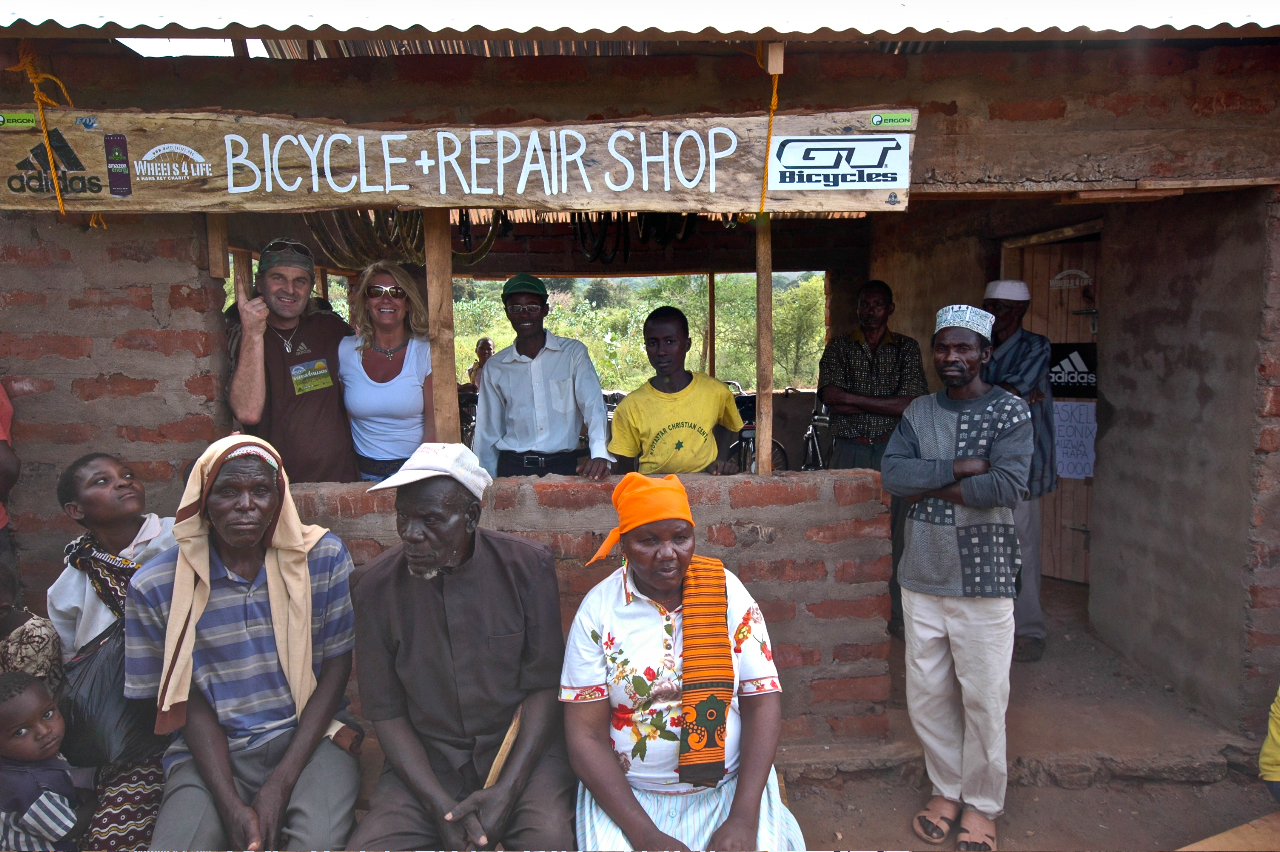
Wheels 4 Life
