= Dynacraft BSC =

American Bicycle distributor

- Logo Used since 2015
- Type: Private
- Founded: June 2, 1984; 42 years ago
- Founder: Jerome Berman
- Headquarters: Port Wentworth, Georgia
- Key people: John Bisges and Bill Talios
- Products: Bicycles, Scooters
- Website: dynacraftwheels.com

Dynacraft BSC, Inc. is a privately held United States–based distributor of bicycles, scooters, battery-operated ride-on, and electric ride-on. Dynacraft is based in Port Wentworth, Georgia, and has its distribution center located there as well.

Dynacraft BSC's product line includes a wide variety of bicycles, including mountain bikes, road bikes, cruiser bikes, and BMX bikes, as well as ride-on toys such as scooters, electric ride-ons, and hoverboards. The company also produces outdoor recreation products such as camping gear, basketball hoops, and trampolines.

Dynacraft products are sold through major chains such as Walmart, Toys"R"Us, Kohl's, Fred Meyer, Canadian Tire, Academy Sports + Outdoor, Exchange Army & Air Force Exchange and through online outlets such as Amazon.

Directors are John Bisges, David Castrucci and Bill Talios.

== History ==
Dynacraft BSC, Inc. imports and distributes various brands of bicycles, scooters, electric ride-ons, and battery-operated ride-ons to major retailers in the United States. Its customers include large toy, department, sporting goods, and mass merchandise chains. The company markets and sells products through retailers and online. Dynacraft BSC, Inc. was formerly known as Dynacraft Industries, Inc. and changed its name to Dynacraft BSC, Inc. in June 2004. The company was incorporated in 1984, moved to San Rafael, California in 1998, and is now based in American Canyon, California.

Dynacraft unveiled some of the first chainless bicycles with its Dekra line in 2006 and in 2009 launched its Sonoma Chainless Bicycle Collection. The design of Sonoma's Chainless D-Drive uses a drive shaft to transmit power from the bike pedals to the rear wheel, eliminating the need for a chain entirely. This advanced system requires minimal maintenance, and is claimed to be cleaner, safer, and longer-lasting than the traditional bicycle chain system. The upright ergonomic design also provides increased comfort for adult riders while reducing strain on the lower back.

In February 2015, Dynacraft introduced a new logo to the company. On April 21 that year Dynacraft launched their social media page on YouTube, Facebook, Instagram, Pinterest, and Twitter.

In late 2016, Dynacraft redesigned their website with Magento.

During Black Friday 2017, Dynacraft introduced The Home Depot dump truck ride-on. The ride-on is only available at The Home Depot online or in store. It is similar to the Tonka Dump truck ride-on.

== Brands ==
Dynacraft owns or licenses different brands of bicycles, scooters, battery operated ride ons, and electric ride ons which include:

- Avengers
- Avigo Bikes
- Barbie
- Bratz
- BMW
- Camo
- Care Bears
- CCM
- DOC McStuffins
- DYNACRAFT
- DinoTrux
- Disney Princess
- Hello Kitty
- Hot Wheels

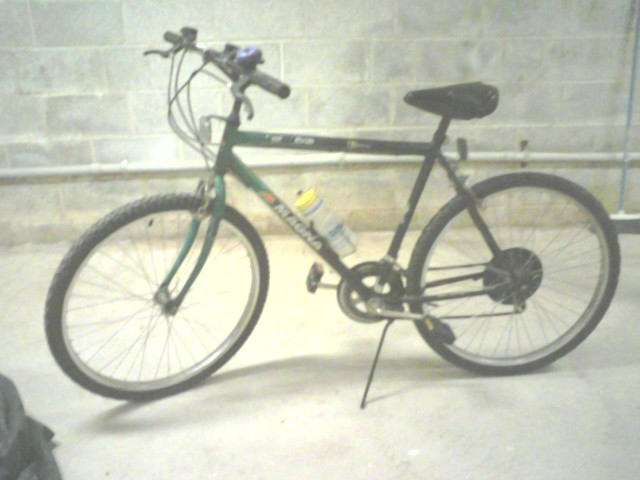
Magna Great Divide

- Magna
- Minions
- Mirraco
- Monster High
- My Little Pony
- Nerf

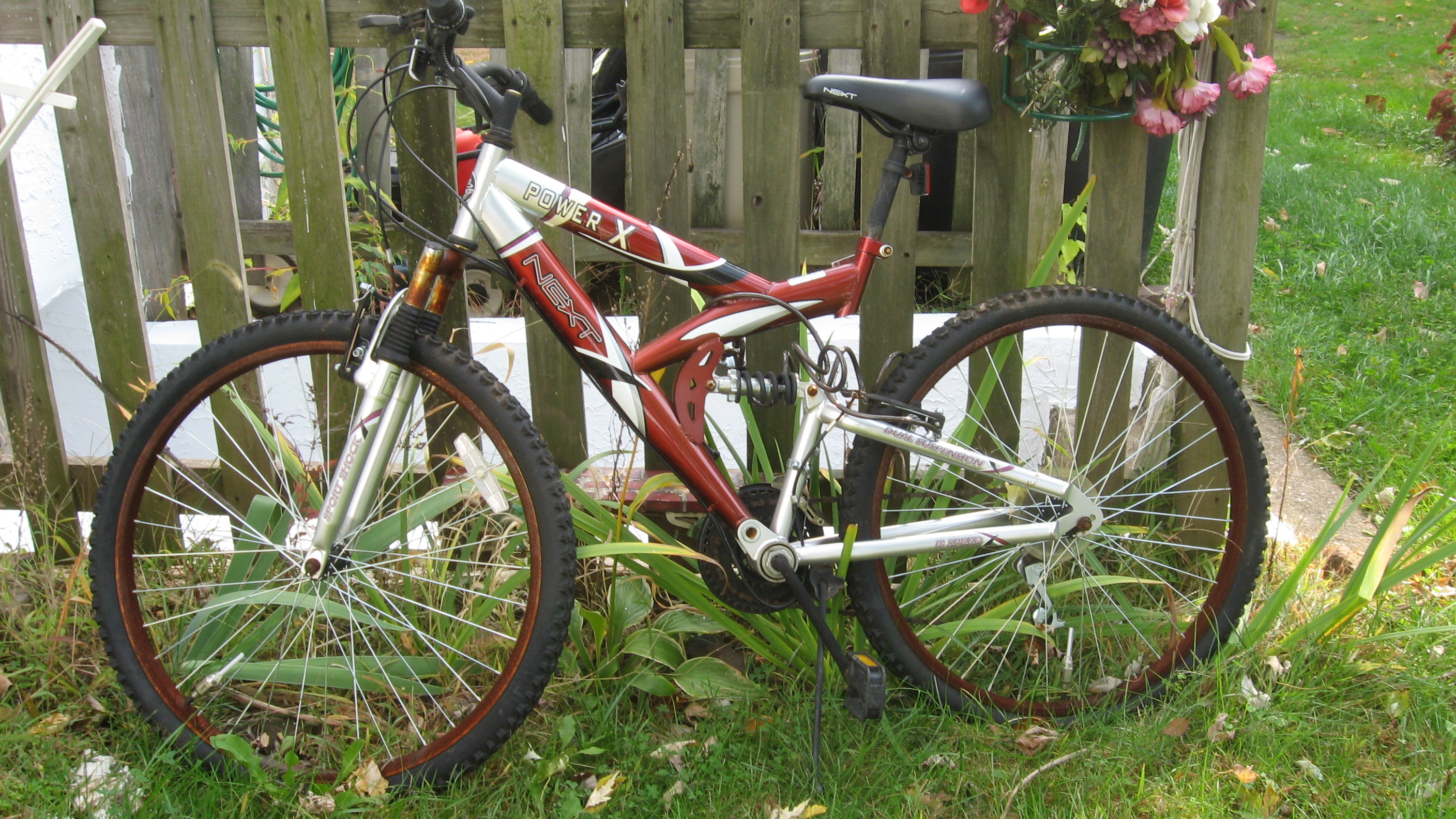
NEXT Power Climber

- Next
- Northern
- Ozone 500
- Power Rangers
- Rallye
- Spider-Man
- SuperCycle
- Surge
- Shopkins
- The Home Depot
- Thomas and Friends
- Tonka
- Tony Hawk
- Transformers
- Triax
- Trolls
- Vertical
- Zombie Princess

== Sweet Suite booth ==
In the 2015 Sweet suite, Dynacraft began to set up a booth at the convention. This introduced the Care Bears and Spider-Man dune buggy.

In the 2016 Sweet suite, Dynacraft introduced the 24V Disney Princess Carriage ride on. This has Working Doors, Working Lanterns, Luxurious Curtains, Heart Shaped Steering Wheel, Enchanting Fairy Tale Sounds, Light-Up Fairy Tale Wand, and a Wear and Share Princess Tiara.

In the 2017 Sweet Suite, Dynacraft introduced the Disney Princess Preschool Carriage. This one is not electric. It is foot to floor. This has a Heart Shaped Steering Wheel from the 24V Disney Princess Carriage.

== Customer Service holiday hours ==
In 2017, for Christmas and New Year's Eve, Dynacraft made Holiday hours through email and phone

On Christmas Day and New Years Day customer service was closed.

Dynacraft displays holiday hours on their contact us page and on their social media pages

== Family Fun Friday ==
In 2018, Dynacraft began a series of Family Fun Friday. The first one was the Shopkins + slime. This will be published in their blog every Friday.

== Recalls ==
=== Magna ===
In 1999, Dynacraft voluntarily recalled about 3,000 Magna "Great Divide," 21-speed mountain bikes, sold in the 24-inch size for girls and boys, and the 26-inch size for women and men. The bikes could have defective handle bar stems which would not tighten sufficiently to lock onto the bicycles. This can cause the front wheel not to turn properly, resulting in serious injuries to the rider from falls. Dynacraft stated that is not aware of any injuries or incidents involving these bicycles. The bikes have a model number on the left side of the seat post. The girls' bikes have model number 8504-50 and are purple. The boys' bikes have model number 8504-51 and are blue. The women's bikes have model number 8547-84 and also are purple. The men's bikes have model number 8547-85 and are black. The words "Great Divide" are located on the cross-tubes of these bicycles and the word "KALLOY" is located on the handlebar stems. Fred Meyer Stores in Alaska, Arizona, Idaho, Oregon, Utah and Washington sold these bikes from December 1998 through August 18, 1999.

=== NEXT ===
In 2002, 132,000 Next Ultra Shock mountain bicycles with "Ballistic 105" front suspension forks were recalled in cooperation with the U.S. Consumer Product Safety Commission (CPSC). There were 20 reports of the suspension forks breaking on the Next Ultra Shock bicycles, resulting in 19 riders suffering injuries that include abrasions, concussions and chipped teeth. US International Co. Ltd. manufactured the forks on these bicycles. These forks can break apart, causing riders to lose control, fall and suffer serious injury. The recall is being conducted in cooperation with the U.S. Consumer Product Safety Commission (CPSC) which previously announced the recall of about 103,000 of these forks sold on bicycles manufactured by Brunswick Corp. There have been 20 reports of the suspension forks breaking on the Next Ultra Shock bicycles, resulting in 19 riders suffering injuries that include abrasions, concussions and chipped teeth. The recall includes only on blue Next Ultra Shock bicycles, with model numbers 8524-14 and 8526-20 manufactured between April 1999 and November 9, 1999. Wal-Mart stores nationwide sold these mountain bikes from May 1999 through December 2000.

During 2003, Dynacraft voluntarily recalled about 52,900 BMX bicycles whose stems could loosen during use, causing riders to lose control and fall. Dynacraft received 35 reports of stems loosening on these bicycles, resulting in one report of an injury (a broken finger). The recall includes two models of 20-inch BMX bicycles. The Next Voltage-model bicycles are metallic green, have model number 8535-99 and were manufactured between March 2002 and June 2002. The Vertical Street Blade-model bicycles are dark blue and chrome colored, have model number 8527-99 and were manufactured between March 2002 and April 2002. Wal-Mart stores sold the Next Voltage-model bicycles nationwide, including Puerto Rico, from May 2002 through November 2002. Pamida stores sold the Vertical Street Blade-model bicycles nationwide from April 2002 through April 2003.

=== Triax and Vertical brands ===
On 28 March 2007, The U.S. Consumer Product Safety Commission, announced a voluntary recall of the Triax PK7 and Vertical PK7 Bicycles. This affected about 32,000 units manufactured by the Shun Lu Bicycle Company, of Guangdong, China, whose frame can crack while in use, causing the rider to lose control and suffer injuries from a fall or collision. This recall involves Triax PK7 (model 8509-24) and Vertical PK7 (model 8596-71T) 20-inch aluminum cushion framed bicycles. The Triax model was manufactured between November 2005 and October 2006, and the Vertical model was manufactured between August 2004 and December 2004. The model numbers and manufacture dates are printed on a label affixed to the bicycle frame. These bicycles were sold at Target stores nationwide from September 2004 through early February 2007 for about $100.

=== City Scooter ===
On February 26, 2013, Dynacraft Recalled the Hello Kitty and Monster High city scooter due to fall hazard. The affected model numbers include 8801-13 and 8801-14. Customers with the Hello Kitty City Scooter were to return it to their local Toys-R-Us or customers with the Monster High City Scooter were to return it to their local Walmart for a refund.

=== Hot Wheels Urban Shredder ===
On April 4, 2013, Dynacraft recalled the Hot Wheels Urban Shredder due to fall hazards. The model numbers are 8801-15 and 8801-05. Customers are to return it to the store where they bought it for a full refund.

=== Avigo ===
in 2014, Dynacraft recalled the Avigo 20 Inch Turn N' Burn Youth Bicycles due to fall hazards. Consumers should immediately stop using the recalled bicycle and contact Dynacraft to arrange for a free repair. The bike was sold from September 2013 to June 2014

=== Ride on's ===
In November 2016, Dynacraft recalled the Tonka Dump truck ride on due to a battery explosion in Washington state similar to the Samsung Galaxy Note 7. The ride on was pulled out of shelves at Toys-R-Us for the investigation which completed in early 2017. In 2017 Dynacraft recalled 3 Ride-ons due to the fall and crash hazards and customers should immediately take the recalled ride-on toys away from children and contact Dynacraft to receive a free replacement foot pedal with installation instructions. Consumers in need of assistance with the repair, can bring the ride-on toy to an authorized service center for a free repair.

== Contests ==
In 2015, Dynacraft made a holiday contest on Facebook. In 2017, Dynacraft made the #dynacraftprincess video contest. They would make a 15-second video taking about what it means to be a princess and upload it to YouTube. The winner got the 24V Disney Princess Carriage ride on. That same year for the summer Dynacraft made a contest. They would post a summer memory image to Instagram. The winner got a Barbie pink passport package including a Barbie bike.
