= Haro Bikes =

American bicycle manufacturer

- Industry: Bicycles
- Predecessor: Haro Designs
- Founded: 1978; 48 years ago in Torrance, California, U.S.
- Founder: Bob Haro
- Headquarters: United States
- Area served: Worldwide
- Products: Freestyle
- Website: Haro Bikes

Haro Bikes Corporation is an American BMX and Mountain bicycle manufacturer which was founded in 1978 by Bob Haro. The Haro bikes were considered Freestyle BMX bikes.

== History ==
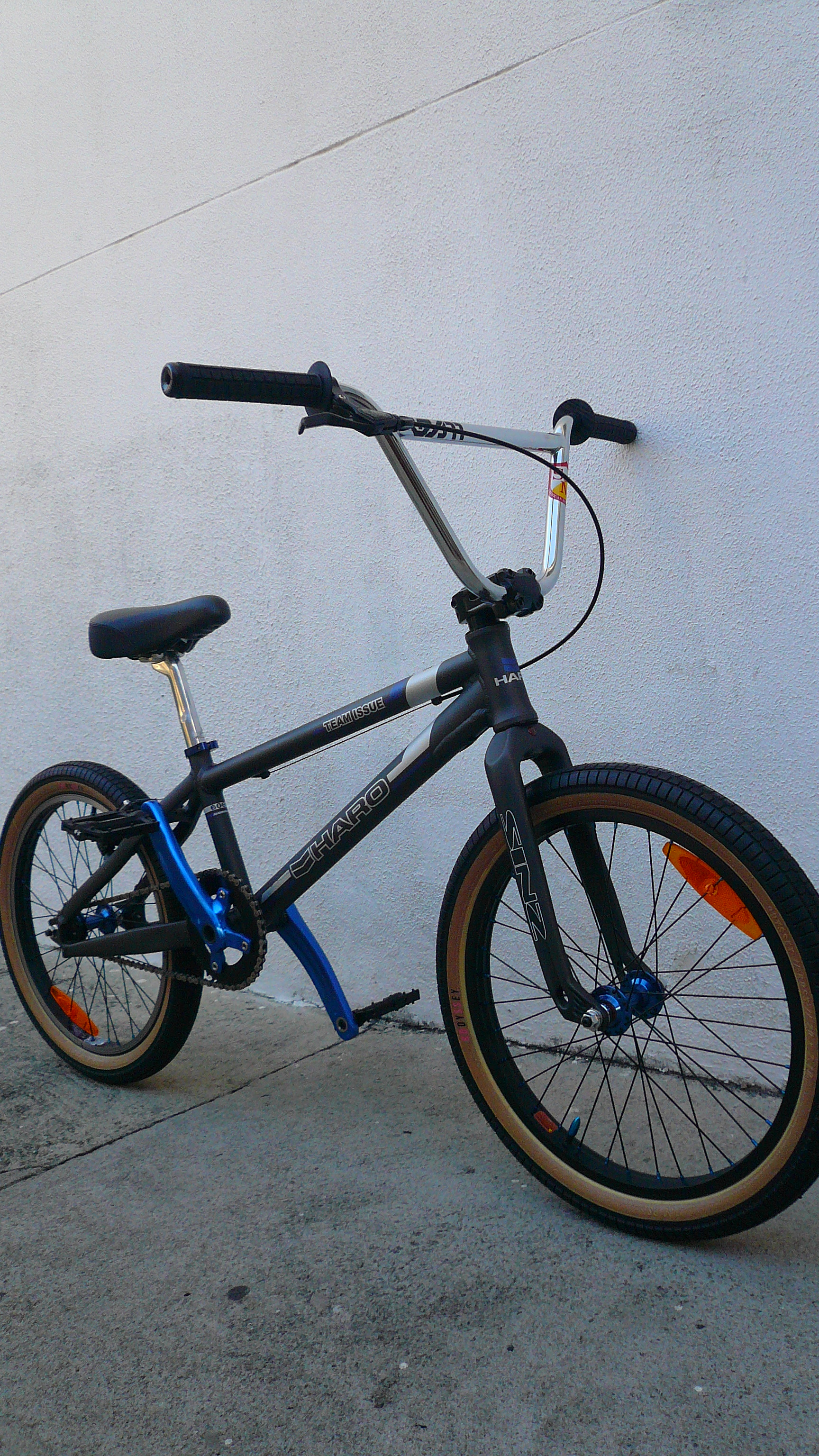
Haro Team Issue BMX bike

=== Haro Bikes ===
The first Haro bikes were manufactured by Torker. In 1982, when Haro introduced his own line of racing bikes, his sponsorship by Torker and Max was terminated.

== Advertiser Haro 1999 Alias NAMI ==
• Simon Baker

• Advertising agency X Games

== See also ==
- List of BMX bicycle manufacturers
