= BMX =

Cycle sport

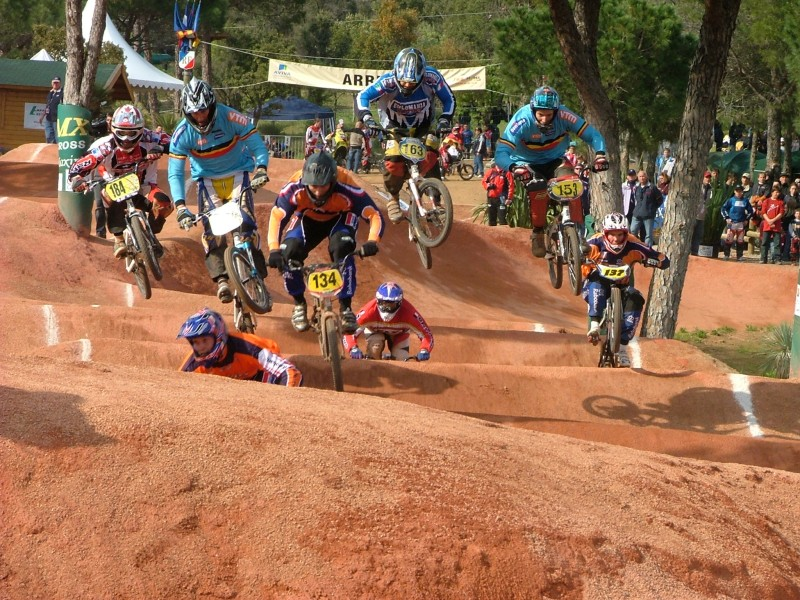
A BMX race. First round of the 2005 European BMX Championships held in Sainte-Maxime, France, on 23 April 2005

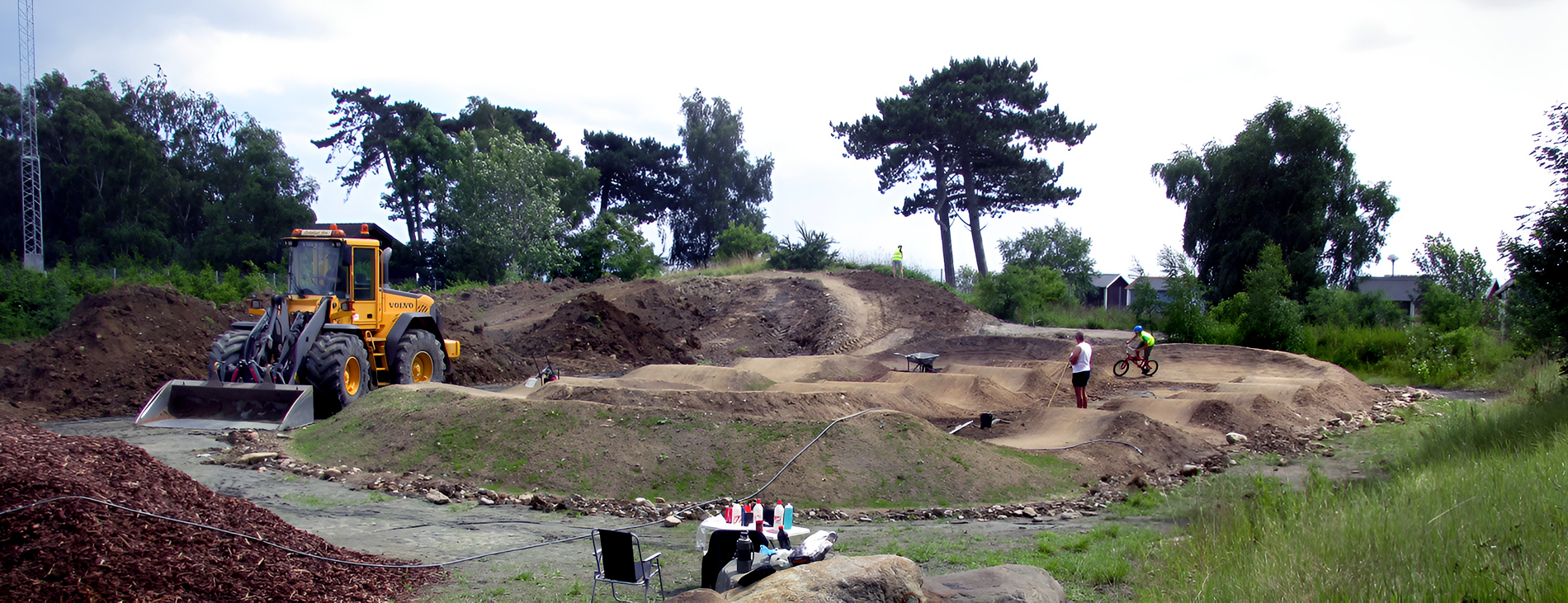
Building of a BMX track in 2016 in Ystad, Sweden

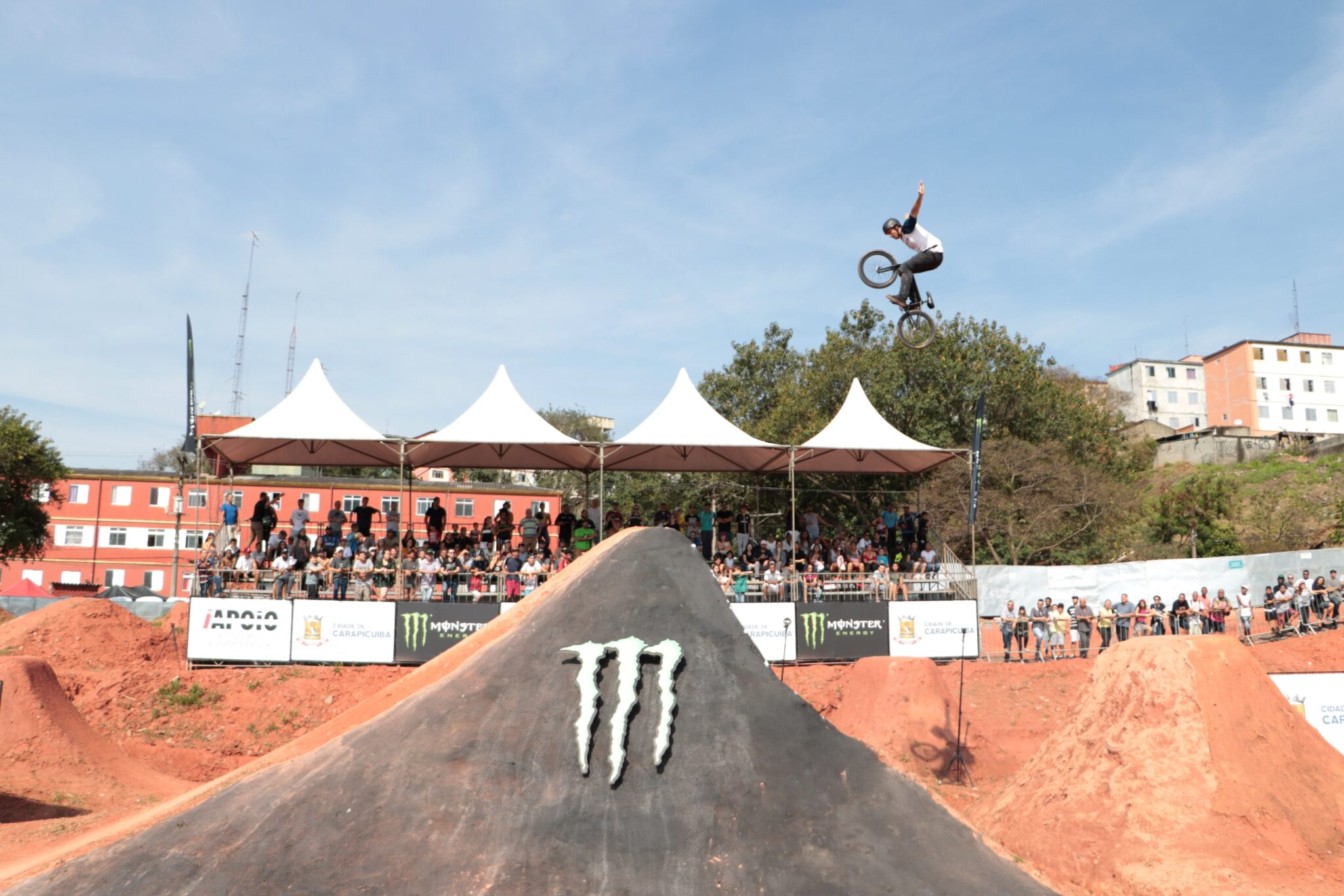
Caracas Trail, considered the best BMX track in Latin America, located in Carapicuíba, Brazil

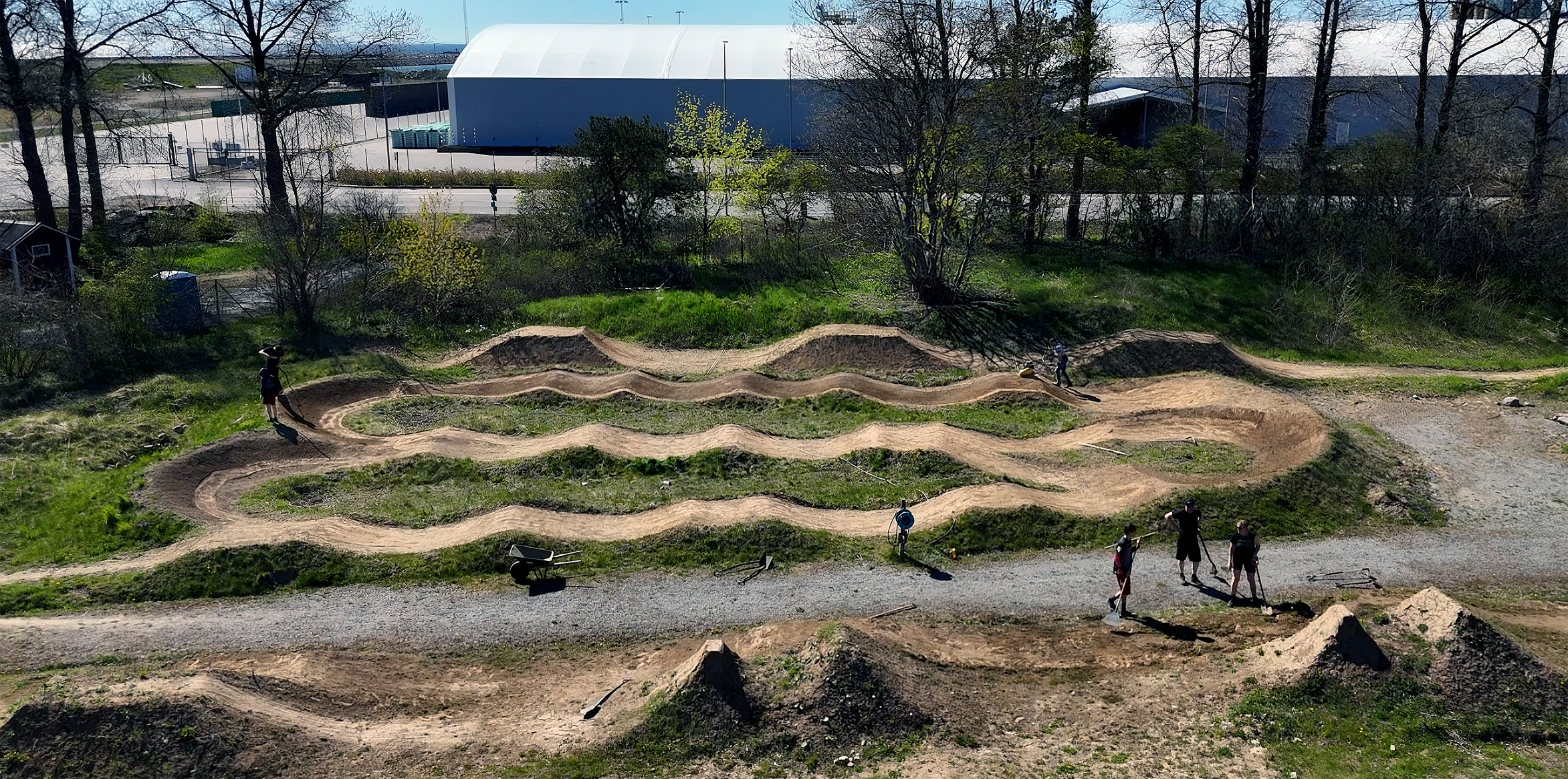
A small BMX track from above

BMX, an abbreviation for bicycle (or bike) motocross, is a cycle sport performed on BMX bikes, either in competitive BMX racing or freestyle BMX, or else in general street or off-road recreation.

== History ==
BMX began during the early 1970s in the United States when children began racing their bicycles on dirt tracks in Southern California, inspired by the motocross stars of the time. The size and availability of the Schwinn Sting-Ray and other wheelie bikes made them the natural bike of choice for these races, since they were easily customized for better handling and performance. BMX racing was a phenomenon by the mid-1970s. Children were racing standard road bikes off-road around purpose-built tracks in California.

The motorcycle racing documentary On Any Sunday (1971) is generally credited with inspiring the movement nationally in the United States; its opening scene shows kids riding their Sting-Rays off-road. By the middle of that decade, the sport achieved critical mass, and manufacturers began creating bicycles designed especially for the sport.

=== American timeline ===
In 1974, George E. Esser founded the National Bicycle League as a non-profit bicycle motocross sanctioning organization. Before they set up the NBL, Esser and his wife, Mary, sanctioned motorcycle races with the American Motocross Association (AMA). Their two sons, Greg and Brian, raced motorcycles, but also enjoyed riding and racing BMX with their friends. It was their sons' interest, and the lack of BMX organizations in the East, which prompted Esser to start the NBL in Florida.

By 1977, the American Bicycle Association (ABA) was organized as a national sanctioning body for the growing sport.

Freestyle BMX is now one of the staple events at the annual Summer X Games Extreme Sports competition and the Etnies Backyard Jam, held primarily on the East and West coasts of the United States. The popularity of the sport has increased due to its relative ease and availability of places to ride and do tricks.

=== British BMX explosion ===
In the UK, BMX was a craze which took off in the early 1980s, specifically 1982 and 1983, when the BMX bike became the must-have bicycle for children and teenagers. The 1983 cult movie BMX Bandits helped establish the sport further worldwide. Previously a small niche area, BMX exploded at this time into the dominant bicycle for the younger rider, with older teenagers and even adults becoming known names through publications like BMX Bi-Weekly, featuring big names like Tim March and Andy Ruffell. The shift to freestyle from racing came in 1985 with popular styling moving from chrome frames and contrasting components in black blue or red being the norm, to brightly coloured bikes in one colour only, including their magnesium alloy wheels and even matching tyres. Because BMX exploded into Britain's streets so suddenly, it was perhaps inevitable that it would implode with similar speed, when the children who rode the bikes left school and went to work. By 1986–1987, sales in the UK had dropped off dramatically, with the new all-terrain bike or mountain bike (another trend from mid-1970s California) taking off, soon to become the most popular adult bicycle.

In 1980, the first BMX track in the UK was founded in Landseer Park, Ipswich, by the Ipswich BMX Club, which still provides coaching and races on a regular basis.

== International development ==
In April 1981, the International BMX Federation was founded, and the first world championships were held in 1982. Since January 1993, BMX has been integrated into the Union Cycliste Internationale.

In 2003, the International Olympic Committee made BMX a medal Olympic sport for the 2008 Summer Olympic Games in Beijing, China, and Māris Štrombergs (male, for Latvia) and Anne-Caroline Chausson (female, for France) became the first Olympic champions.

Many talented BMX riders go on to other cycling sports like downhill, including Australian Olympian Jared Graves, Eric Carter and youth BMX racer Aaron Gwin. Multiple world and Olympic champion track sprinter Chris Hoy also began as a BMX rider.

== See also ==
- BMX bike
- BMX racing
- Dirt jumping
- Freestyle BMX
- Glossary of cycling
- List of BMX bicycle manufacturers
- Pump track
