= DeGroot =

DeGroot is an agglutinated form of the Dutch surname De Groot. It may refer to:

== People ==
- Bruce DeGroot (born 1963), American politician
- Chad DeGroot (born 1974), American freestyle BMX rider
- Diede de Groot (born 1986), Dutch Tennis Grand Slam Champion
- Dudley DeGroot (1899–1970), American athlete and coach
- Gerard DeGroot, author of the 2008 book The Sixties Unplugged
- Morris H. DeGroot (1931–1989), American statistician

== Characters ==
- Gerald and Karen DeGroot, characters on the American television show Lost
- LuAnn DeGroot, main character of the comic strip Luann

== See also ==
- De Groot, a surname
- De Groote, a surname
- Groot (surname)
