= De Groot =

De Groot (pronounced [də ˈɣroːt]) is a surname of Dutch origin.

Translating as "the great/big/large/tall" it originated as a nickname for a big or tall person. The name has sometimes been Latinized as Grotius, as in the case of Hugo Grotius. In 2007, there were 36,147 people with this surname in the Netherlands, making it the 13th most common surname in the country, and 1179 in Belgium. Less common variants are De Groote (729 in Netherlands, 5093 in Belgium), De Grooth (127, 0), Groot (9239, 43) and Groote (777, 2). The form "De Grote", matching modern Dutch grammar, is very rare (43 in the Netherlands only), and names like Karel de Grote tend to refer to historical figures called "the Great"", in this case Charlemagne. The agglutinated forms DeGroot and Degroot are mostly found abroad.

Notable people with the name include:

- Adriaan de Groot (1914–2006), Dutch chess master and psychologist
- Alejandro López de Groot (born 1993), Spanish footballer
- Anne De Groot (born 1950s), American immunologist and entrepreneur
- Barbara Hallquist DeGroot (born 1957), American tennis player
- Bart de Groot (born 1990), Dutch footballer
- Bob de Groot (born 1941), Belgian comic book writer
- Boudewijn de Groot (born 1944), Dutch singer and songwriter
- Bram de Groot (born 1974), Dutch road bicycle racer
- Bruce DeGroot (born 1963), American politician in Missouri
- Carlijn de Groot (born 1986), Dutch cricketer
- Chad Degroot (born 1974), American bike motocross rider
- Cor de Groot (1914–1993), Dutch pianist and composer
- Cornelis de Groot (1546–1610), Dutch jurist
- Cornelis Hofstede de Groot (1863–1930), Dutch art collector, art historian and museum curator
- Daan de Groot (1933–1982), Dutch road and track cyclist
- David de Groot (1871–1933), Dutch-born British violinist
- Dick de Groot (1920–2019), Dutch-born American painter
- Diede de Groot (born 1996), Dutch tennis Grand Slam Champion
- Dirk de Groot (born 1943), Dutch football player and coach
- Donny de Groot (born 1979), Dutch footballer
- Dudley DeGroot (1899–1970), American football player and coach
- Edward Stanley de Groot (1894–1961), Irish-born violinist and entertainer known as Stanelli
- Ethan de Groot (born 1998), New Zealand rugby union player
- Etienne De Groot (born 1948), President of the Belgian Constitutional Court
- Francis de Groot (1888–1969), Irish Colonel who "upstaged" New South Wales Premier, Jack Lang during opening of Sydney Harbour Bridge
- Frederik de Groot (born 1946), Dutch actor
- Guillaume de Groot (1836–1922), Belgian sculptor
- Harry de Groot (1920–2004), Dutch composer, accordionist and singer
- Hugo de Groot (Hugo Grotius) (1583–1645), Dutch jurist and poet
- Hugo de Groot (1897–1986), Dutch composer and conductor
- Huug de Groot (1890–1957), Dutch footballer
- Jan de Groot (painter) (1650–1726), Dutch painter
- Jan Jakob Maria de Groot (1854–1921), Dutch Sinologist and historian of religion
- Jan H. de Groot (1901–1990), Dutch poet, journalist, and resistance fighter
- Jannie de Groot (1930–2011), Dutch swimmer
- Jeanne Lampl-de Groot (1895–1987), Dutch psychiatrist
- Joeri de Groot (born 1977), Dutch rower
- Johannes de Groot (1914–1972), Dutch mathematician (topology)
- Klaas de Groot (born 1940), Dutch biomedical engineer
- Klaas de Groot (wrestler) (1919–1994), Dutch Greco-Roman wrestler
- Leen de Groot (born 1946), Dutch racing cyclist
- Luc(as) de Groot (born 1963), Dutch type designer
- Marie-José de Groot (born 1966), Dutch rower
- Morris H. DeGroot (1931–1989), American statistician
- Myra De Groot (1937–1988), English-Australian actress
- Nanno de Groot (1913–1963), Dutch-American abstract painter
- Nicholas de Groot (born 1975), Canadian cricketer
- Pat de Groot (1930–2018), English-born American painter and illustrator
- Paul de Groot (1899–1986), Dutch communist politician
- Petrus Hofstede de Groot (1802–1886), Dutch theologian
- Pieter de Groot (1615–1678), Dutch regent and diplomat
- Raphaëlle de Groot (born 1974), Canadian artist and educator
- Robyn de Groot (born 1987), South African road bicycle racer
- Ron de Groot (born 1960), Dutch footballer
- Roy Andries De Groot (1910–1983), British and American food writer
- Sybren Ruurds de Groot (1916–1994), Dutch theoretical physicist
- Sytske de Groot (born 1986), Dutch rower
- Tom de Grooth (born 1979), Dutch cricketer
- Tavish Finnegan DeGroot, fictional character from 2007 game Team Fortress 2

== See also ==
- DeGroot, surname
- Groot (surname)
