= Groote =

Groote is a Dutch surname. Notable people with the surname include:

- Geert Groote (1340–1384), Dutch Roman Catholic deacon and theologian
- Jan Friso Groote (born 1965), Dutch computer scientist
- Matthias Groote (born 1973), German politician

== See also ==
- Groote Eylandt, the fourth largest island in Australia
- De Groote
- Groot, a Marvel Comics character
- Groot (disambiguation)
- De Groot
