= Cinquantenaire Arcade =

Memorial arcade in Brussels, Belgium

- Arcade(s) du Cinquantenaire (French); Arcade(s) van het Jubelpark (Dutch)
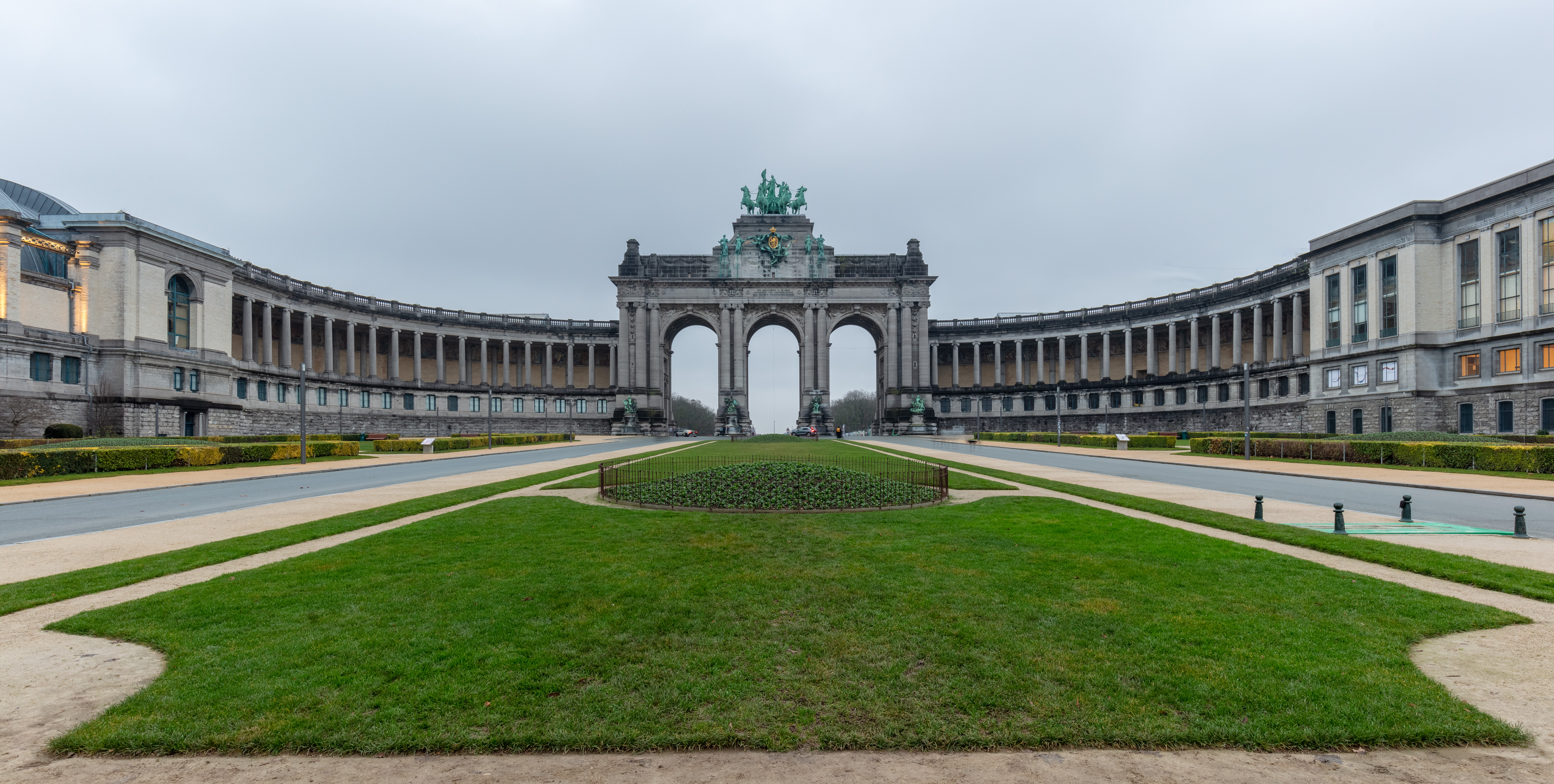
- Cinquantenaire/Jubelpark memorial arcade

General information
- Type: Colonnade and memorial arch
- Architectural style: Neoclassical
- Location: Parc du Cinquantenaire / Jubelpark, 1000 City of Brussels, Brussels-Capital Region, Belgium
- Coordinates: 50°50′25″N 4°23′34″E
- Construction started: 4 January 1905
- Completed: 27 September 1905

Design and construction
- Architects: Gédéon Bordiau, Charles Girault
- Designations: Protected (29/06/1984)

Other information
- Public transit: Brussels-Schuman; 1 5 Schuman and Merode

The Cinquantenaire Arcade (French: Arcade(s) du Cinquantenaire; Dutch: Arcade(s) van het Jubelpark) is a memorial arcade in the centre of the Parc du Cinquantenaire/Jubelpark in Brussels, Belgium. The centrepiece is a monumental triple arch known as the Cinquantenaire Arch (French: Arc du Cinquantenaire; Dutch: Triomfboog van het Jubelpark). It is topped by a bronze quadriga sculptural group with a female charioteer, representing the Province of Brabant personified raising the national flag.

The monument is oriented facing Brussels' city centre, on one side in the axis of the Rue de la Loi/Wetstraat, which, crossing the Leopold Quarter, ends in the Royal Quarter, seat of the Belgian Parliament, the Belgian government and the Royal Palace; and on the other side, in the axis of the Avenue de Tervueren/Tervurenlaan, leads to the former Palace of the Colonies, today's Royal Museum for Central Africa, in the suburb of Tervuren. The Cinquantenaire area is served by Brussels-Schuman railway station, as well as by the metro stations Schuman and Merode on lines 1 and 5.

== History ==
The Cinquantenaire Arcade was part of a project commissioned by the Belgian government under the patronage of King Leopold II for the 1880 National Exhibition, commemorating the 50th anniversary of the Belgian Revolution. In 1880, only the bases of the memorial arch's columns were completed, and during the exhibition, the rest of the arch was constructed from wooden panels. In the following years, the monument's completion was the topic of a continuous battle between Leopold II and the Belgian government, which did not want to spend the money required to complete it.

The original single arch of the 1880 exhibition was conceived by the architect Gédéon Bordiau, but upon his death in 1904, the arch's design was revised by the French architect Charles Girault, chosen by Leopold II. Girault designed a triple arch, but preserved Bordiau's idea of the quadriga. The foundation of the new arch was laid down on 4 January 1905, replacing Bordiau's temporary arch. The basic construction was completed with private funding in May of the same year and the arcade was inaugurated by Leopold II on 27 September 1905, just in time for the 75th anniversary of Belgian independence.

The monument received protected status on 29 June 1984. Plans were announced in 2022 to renovate the Parc du Cinquantenaire including the archway as part of a project called "Cinquantenaire Bicentenaire" for the 200th anniversary of Belgium's independence.

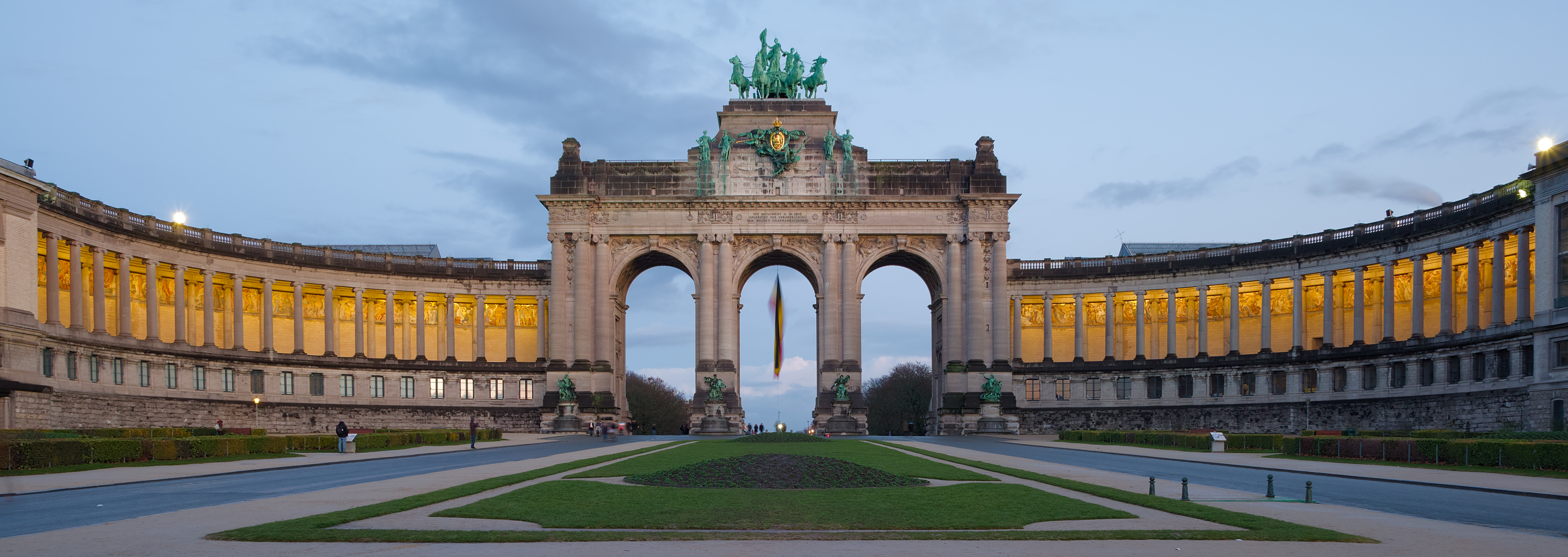
Panoramic view of the Cinquantenaire Arcade. The Cinquantenaire Arch was completed in 1905, replacing a previous temporary version of the arcade.

== Description ==
=== Arch ===
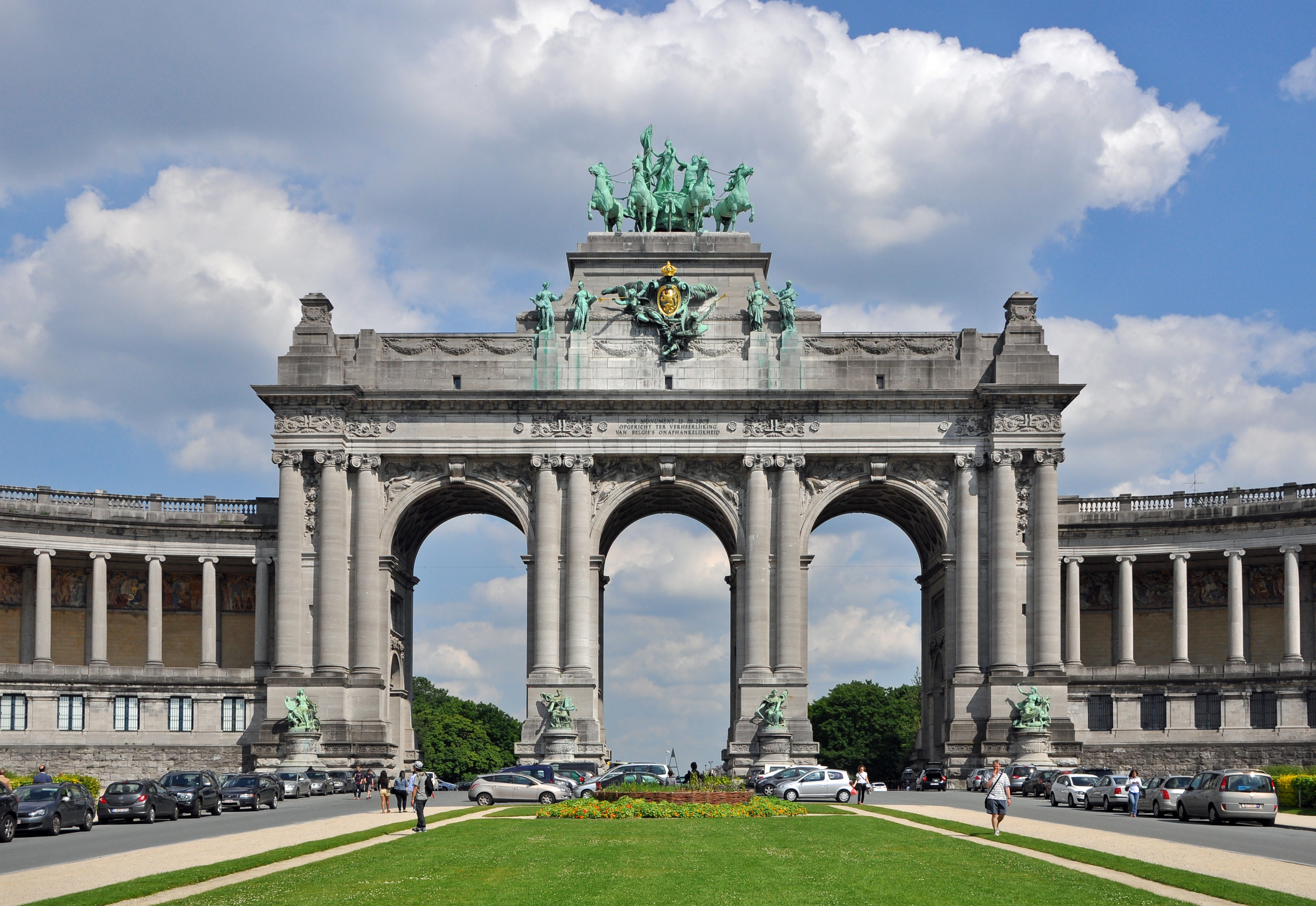
The Cinquantenaire Arch

The Cinquantenaire Arch, 30-metre-wide (98 ft) and 45-metre-high (148 ft), has three bays of equal dimensions. The ceiling, whose arches are semi-circular, is made up of stone caissons, decorated for half of them with a laurel wreath, and for the rest with the acronym meaning "The King, and Law, and Liberty!", one of Belgium's official pledges. The monument's decoration and the sculptures that adorn it were entrusted to the most prominent artists of the time in a spirit of national exaltation.

==== Quadriga ====
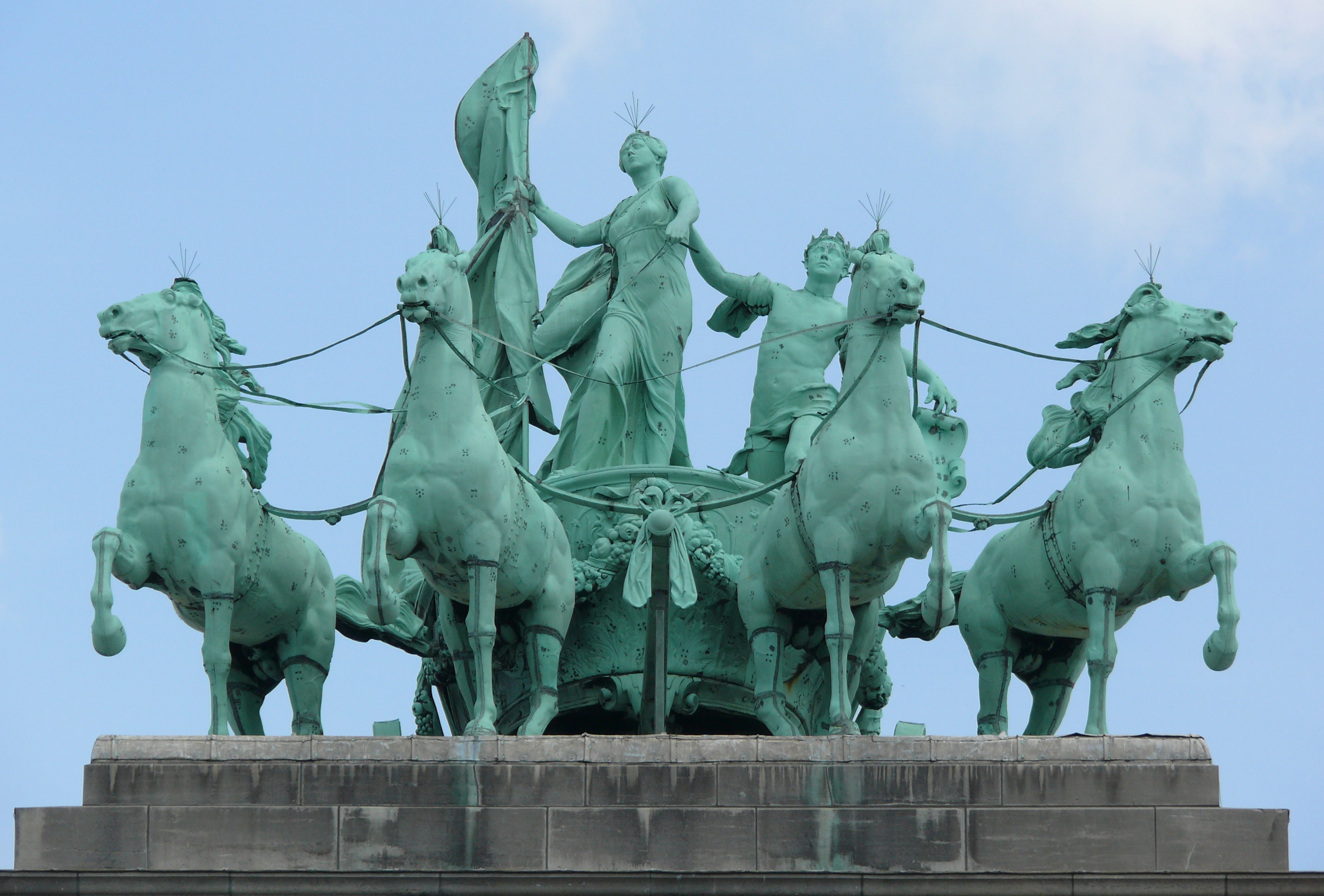
The quadriga (or Brabant Raising the National Flag) by Thomas Vinçotte and Jules Lagae

The arch's bronze quadriga, entitled Brabant Raising the National Flag, was made by Thomas Vinçotte and the horses by Jules Lagae. The pedestal, facing the Avenue de Tervueren/Tervurenlaan, bears the inscription: "This monument was erected in 1905 for the glorification of the independence of Belgium", with the year shown in Roman numerals. A spiral staircase, now flanked by an elevator, provides access to the exhibition room located under the quadriga and to the two terraces located on either side of it.

==== Columns and sculptures ====
The columns echo the original layout of the Avenue de Tervueren, which was once divided into three roadways lined with a double row of trees. At the foot of the arch, a total of eight statues depicting personifications of Belgian Provinces can be found on either sidewall (Brabant being represented by the quadriga): Province of Hainaut and Province of Limburg by Albert Desenfans, Province of Antwerp and Province of Liège by Charles van der Stappen, Province of East Flanders and Province of West Flanders by Jef Lambeaux, and Province of Namur and Province of Luxembourg by Guillaume de Groot. Twelve spandrels are decorated with allegories of Arts and Industry.

Cinquantenaire Arch's sculptures

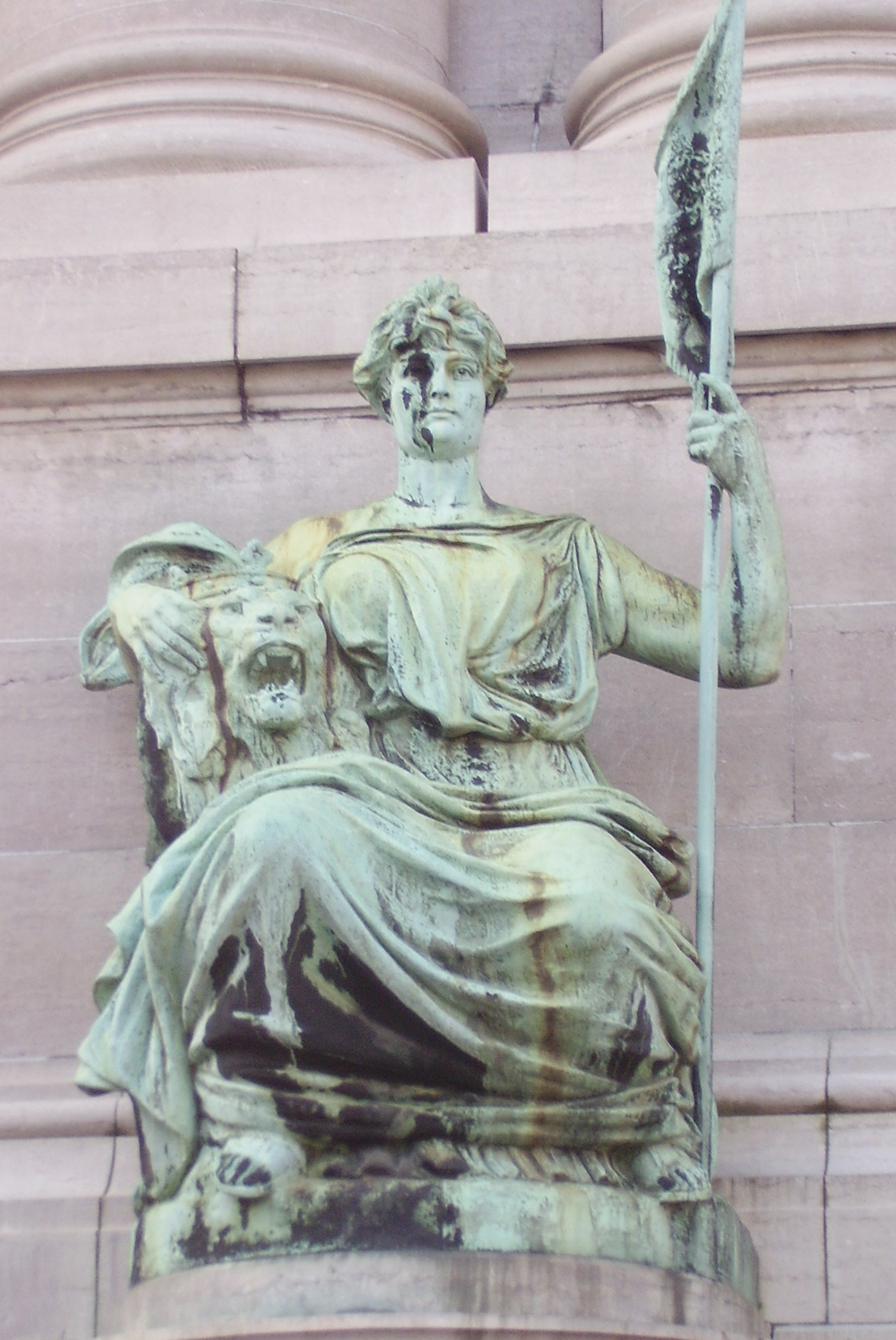
Province of West Flanders by Jef Lambeaux

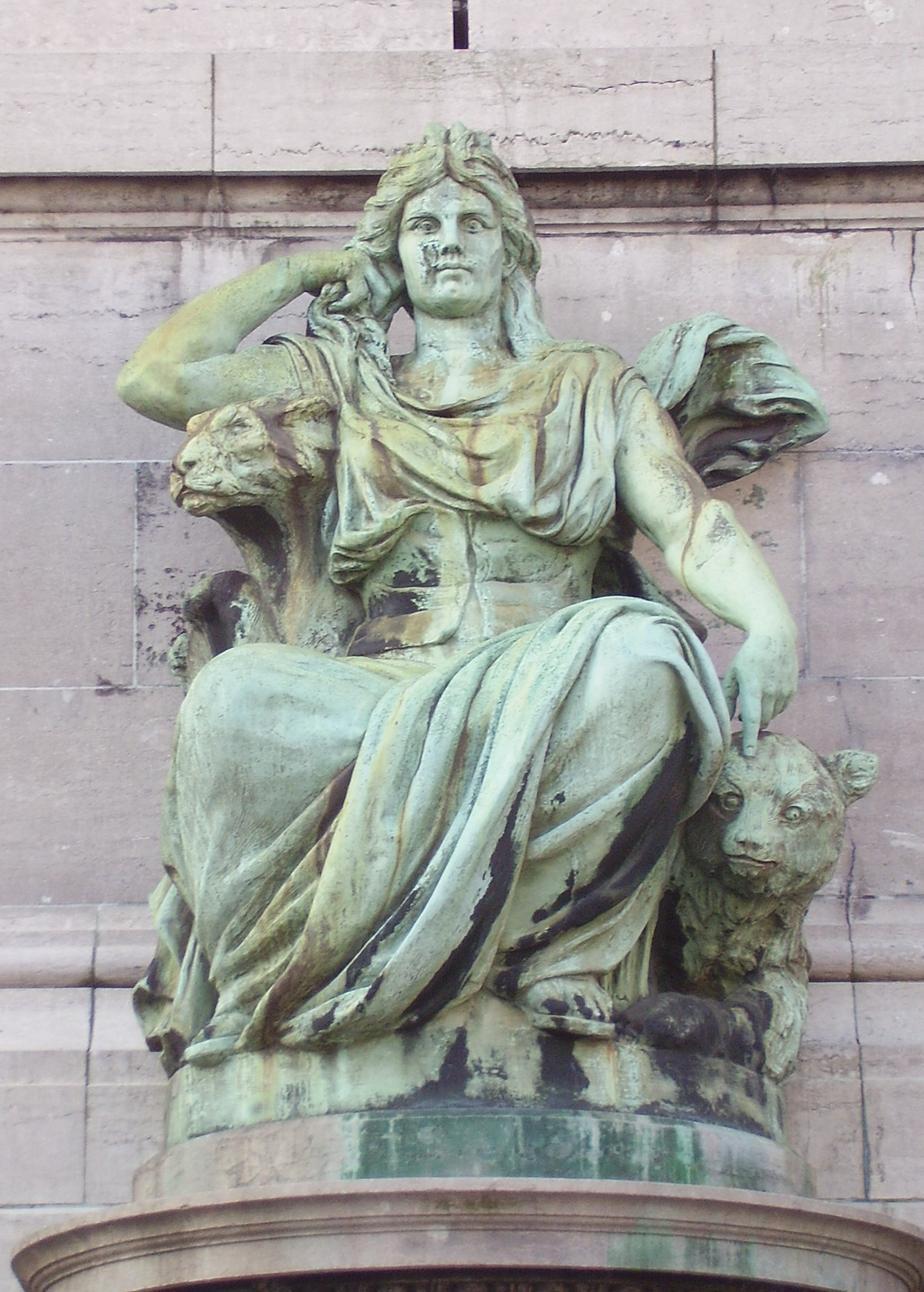
Province of East Flanders by Lambeaux

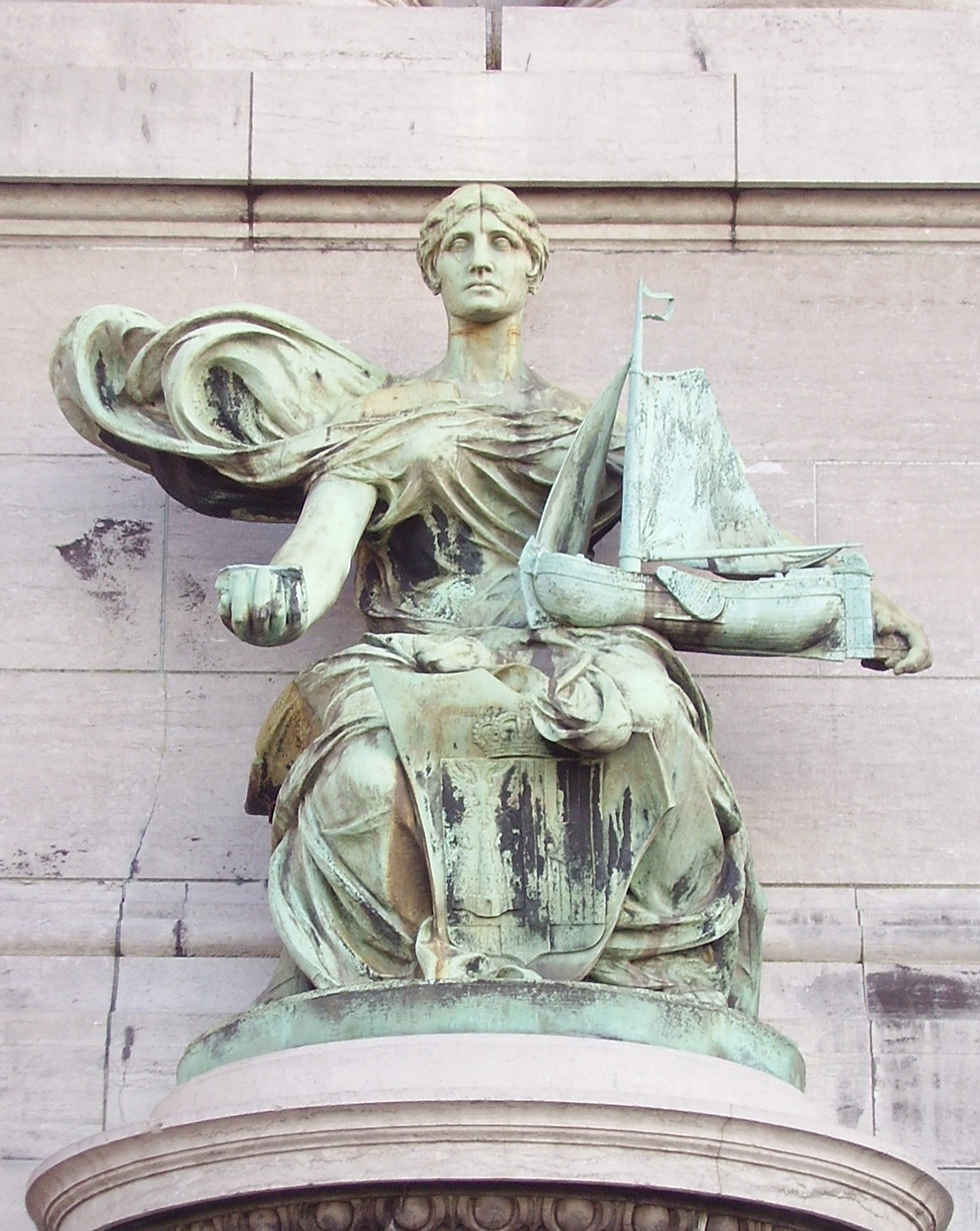
Province of Antwerp by Charles van der Stappen

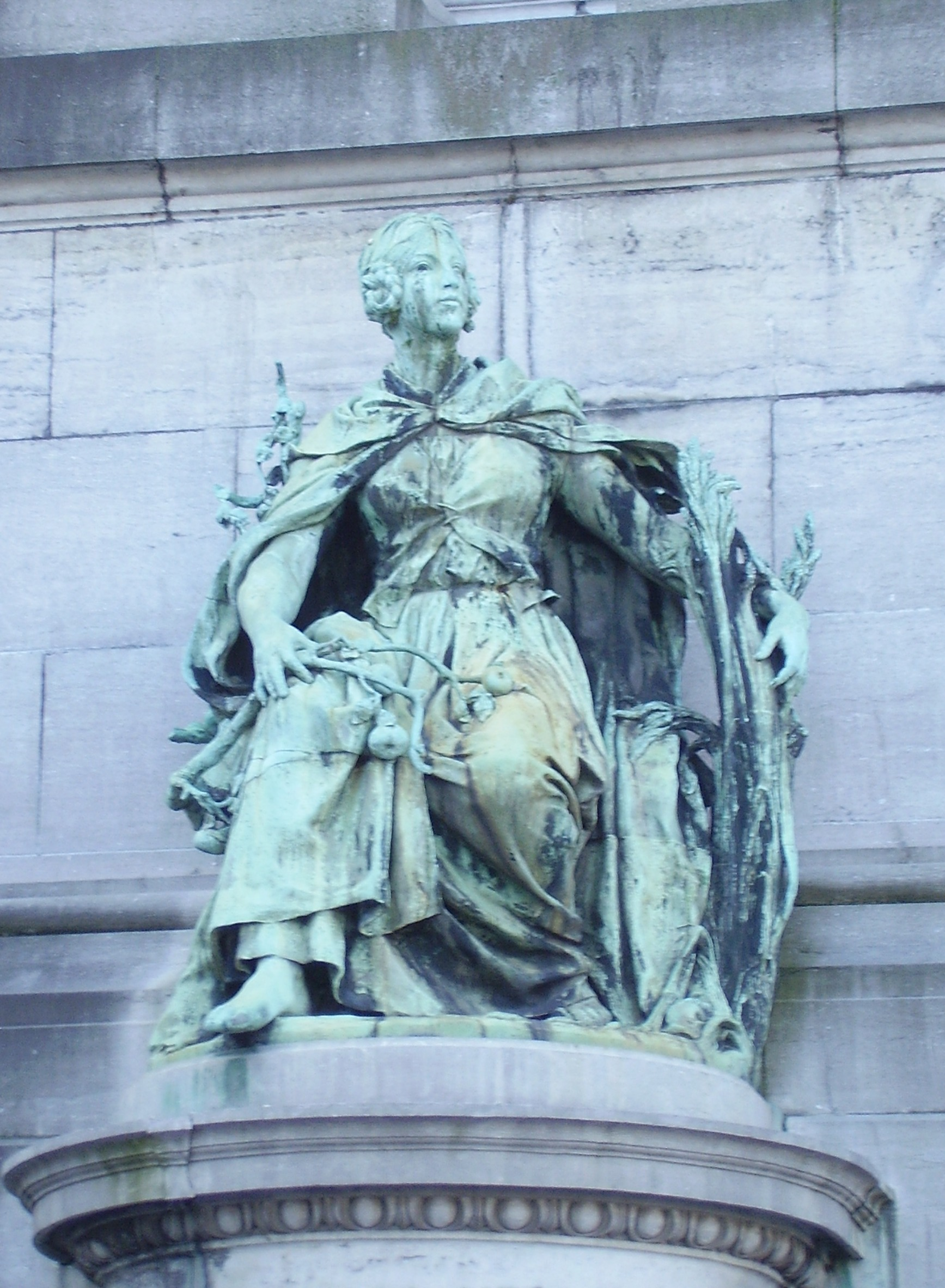
Province of Limburg by Albert Desenfans

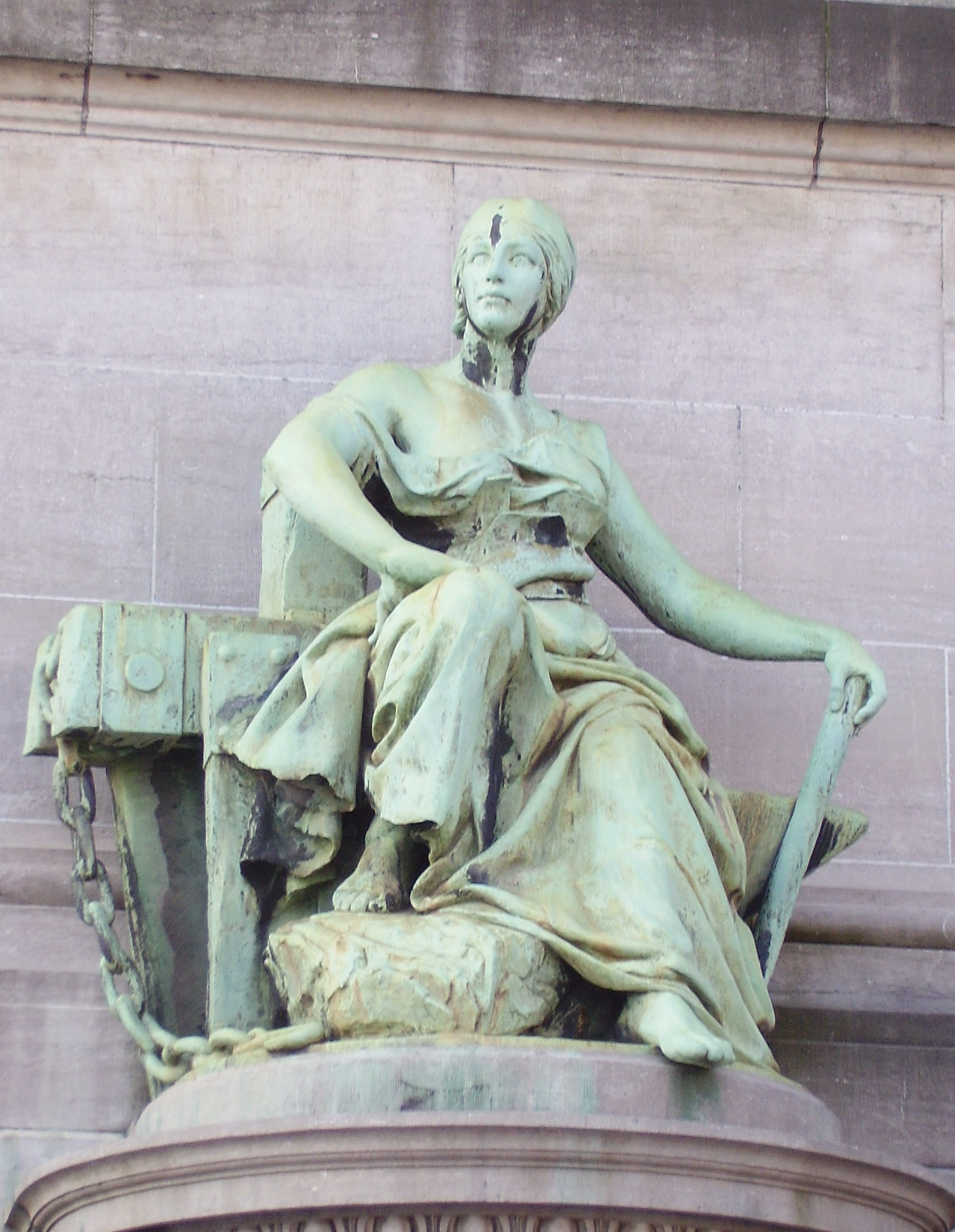
Province of Hainaut by Desenfans

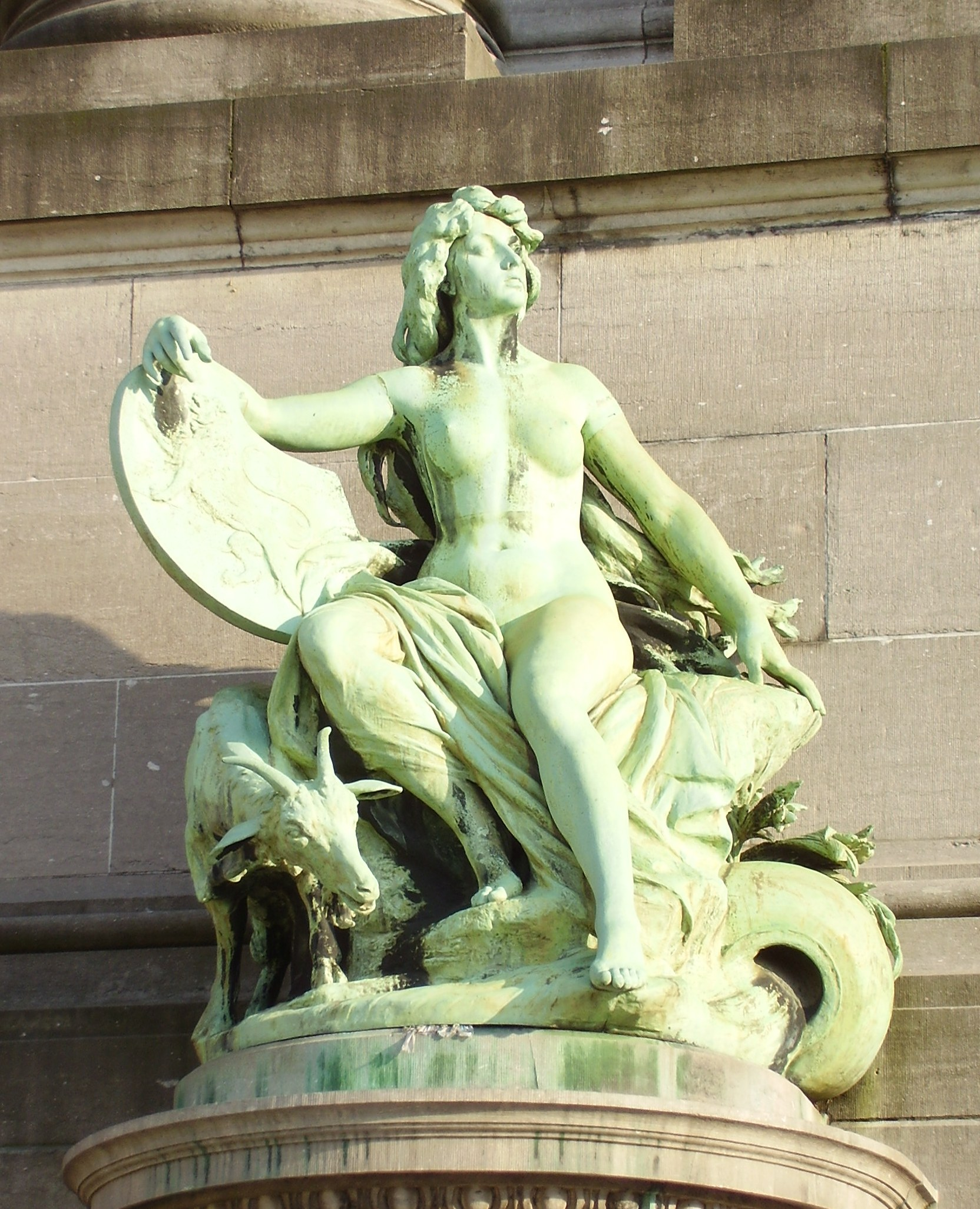
Province of Namur by Guillaume de Groot

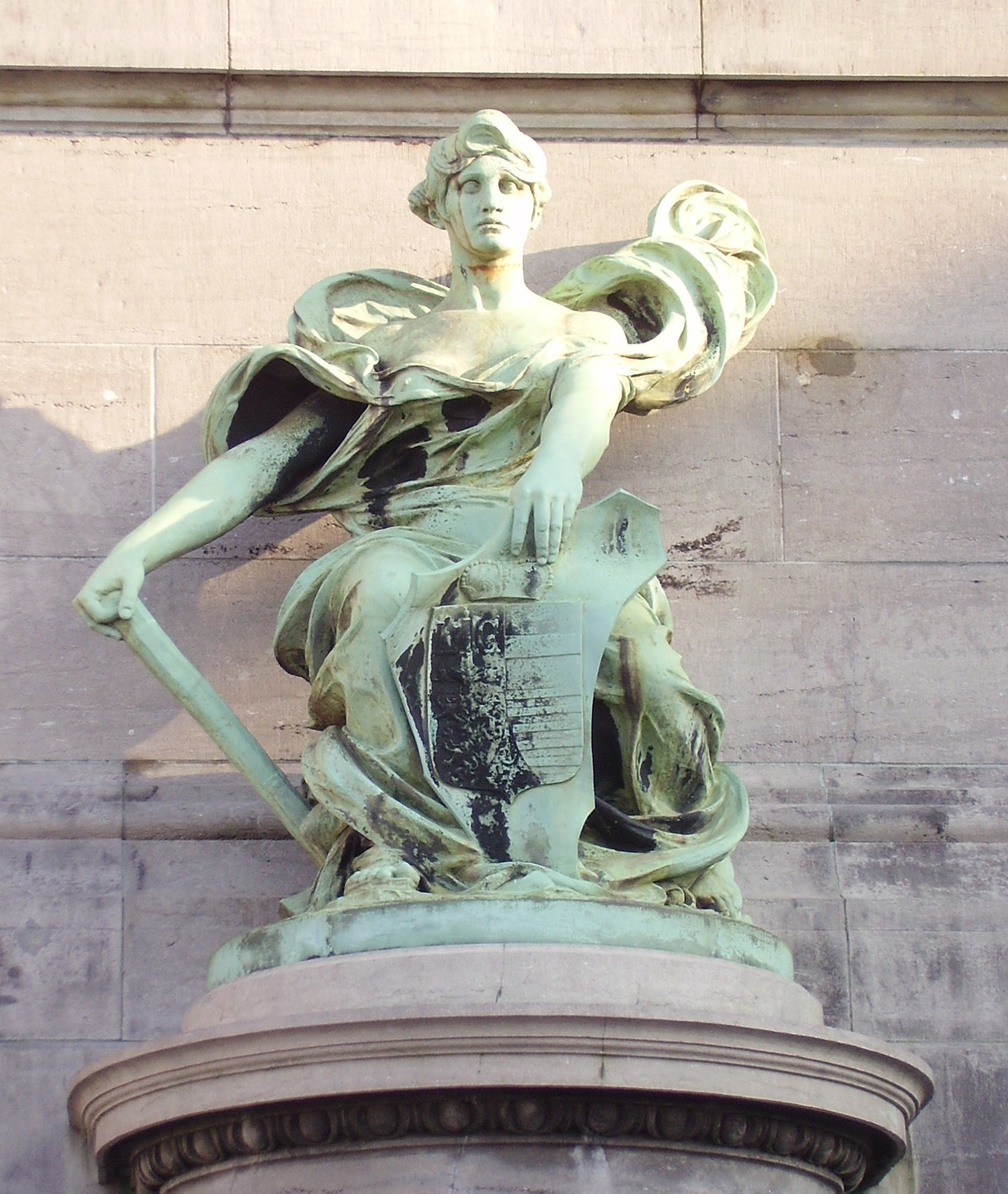
Province of Liège by Van der Stappen

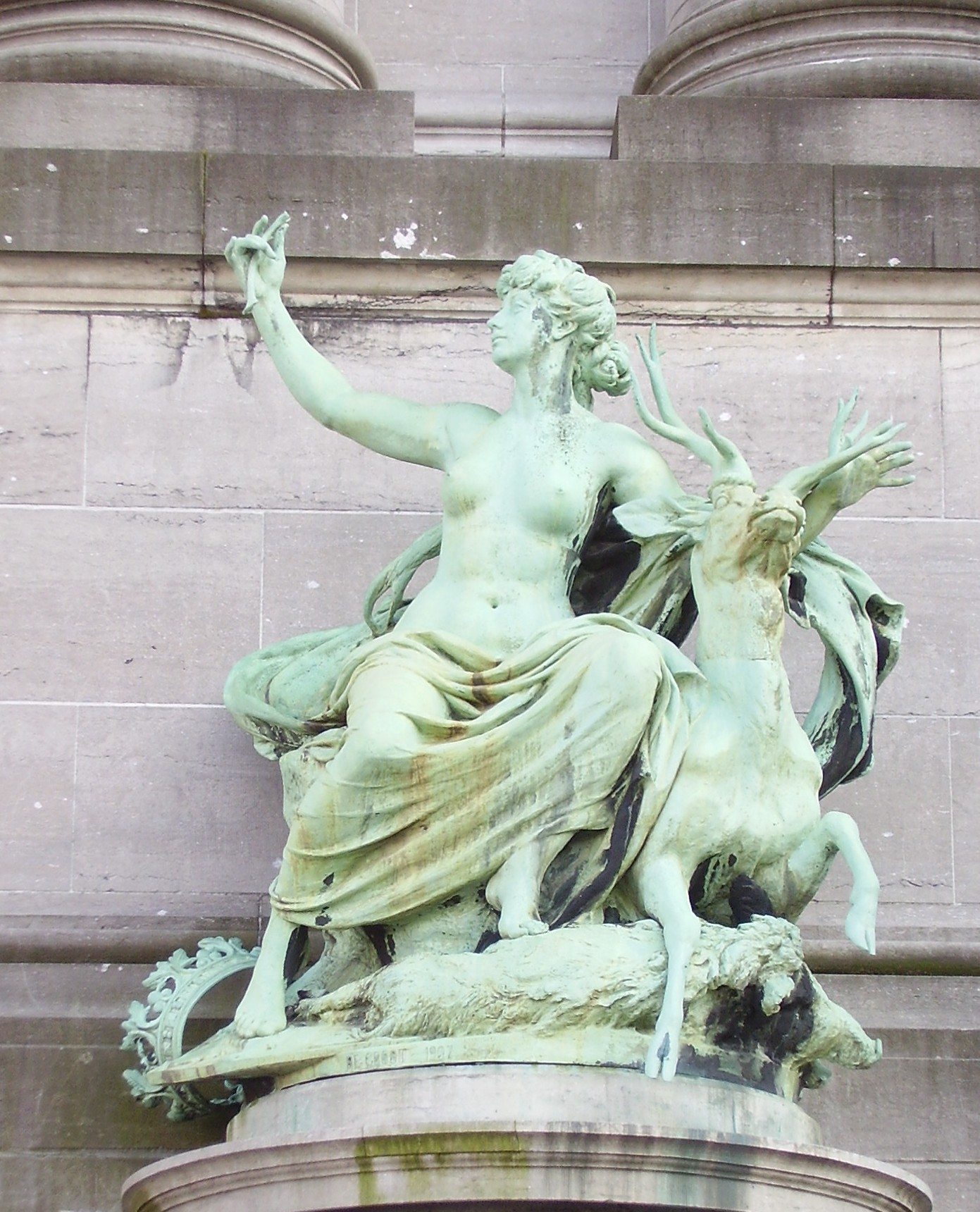
Province of Luxembourg by De Groot

=== Colonnade and frieze ===
The originally open colonnade was closed at the rear by a wall in 1905, which starting in 1912, was decorated with a 360 m^{2} (3,900 sq ft) mosaic frieze with the theme The glorification of peaceful and heroic Belgium, by Jean Delville. He was then joined by several other artists. The mosaic decoration was completed in 1932.

The Knight-King, Albert I, mosaic by Jean Delville, 1920

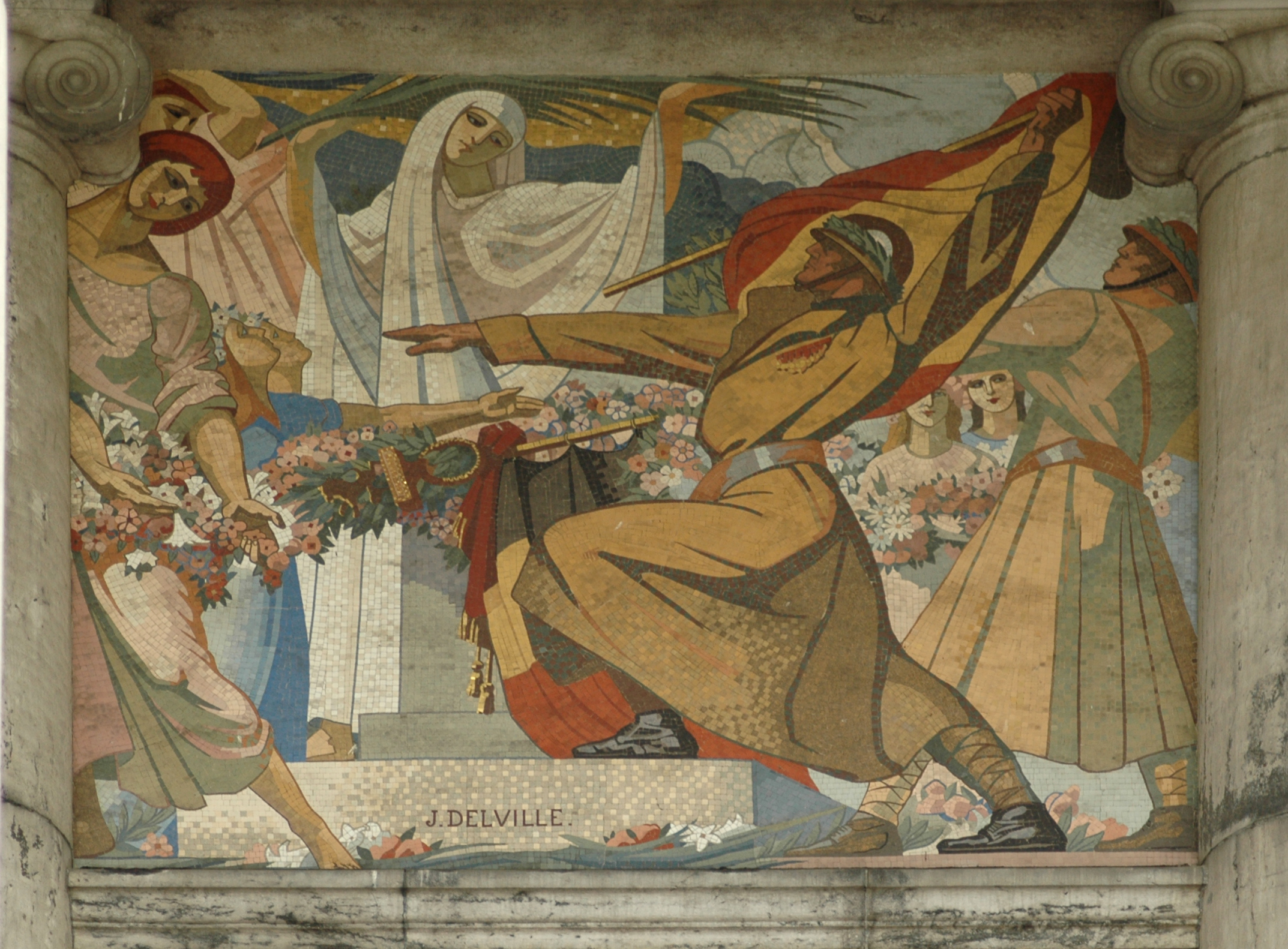
The Victory of the Fallen, Delville, 1920

The Trumpets of Victory, Delville, 1920

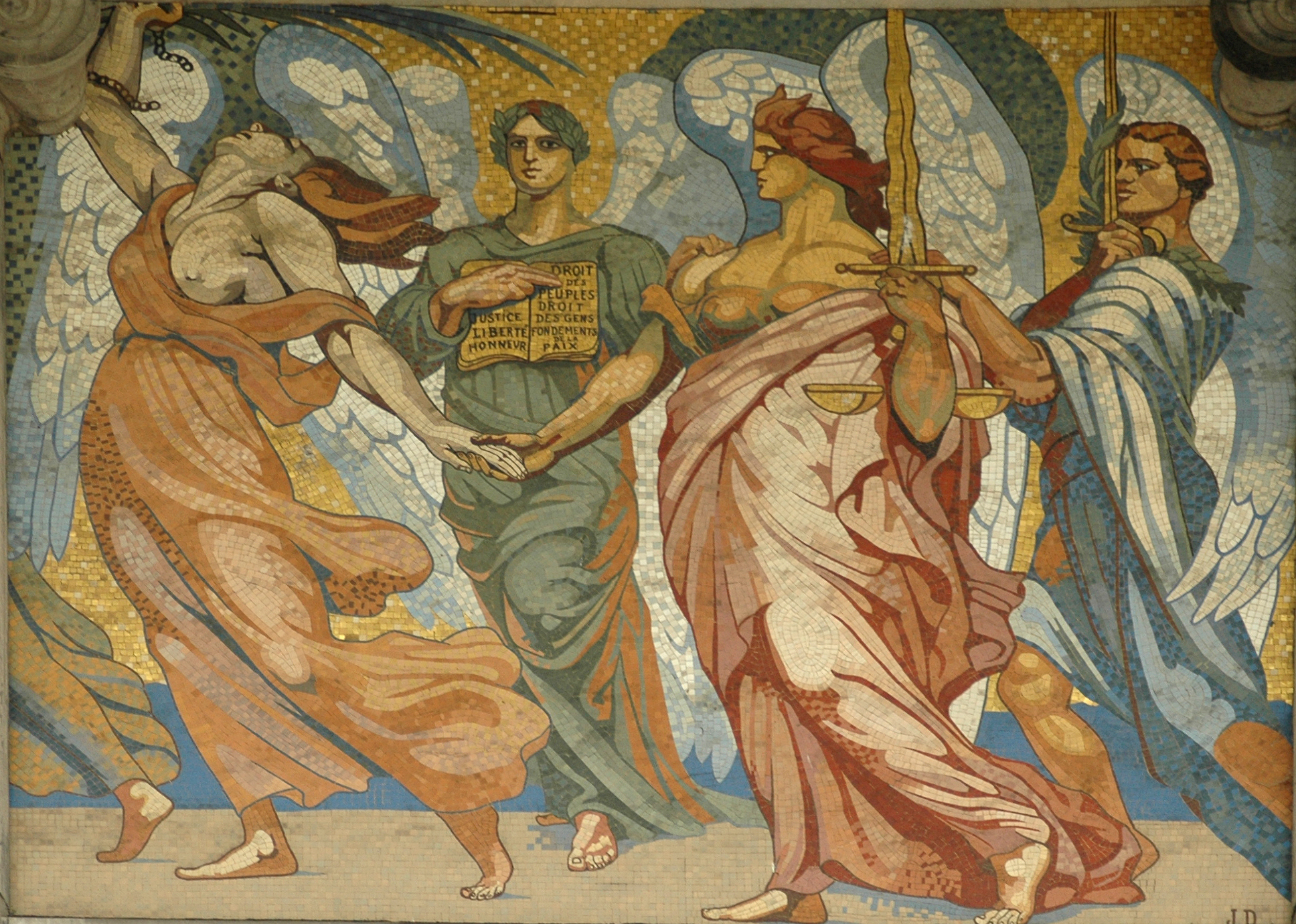
The Victory of Law and Justice, Delville, 1920

== Location and accessibility ==
The various buildings of the Cinquantenaire, of which the arch forms the centrepiece, host three museums: the Royal Museum of the Armed Forces and of Military History, the Art & History Museum and Autoworld automobile museum. The Temple of Human Passions by Victor Horta, a remainder from 1886, and the Great Mosque of Brussels from 1978, are located in the north-western corner of the park.

In front of the arch lies a large esplanade cutting through the Cinquantenaire Park. This esplanade has been used for several purposes, such as military parades and drive-in movies in the summer, as well as a filming location for films and music videos. It is also the starting point for the 20 km of Brussels, an annual run with 30,000 participants.

Lines 1 and 5 of the Brussels Metro, as well as the Belliard Tunnel from the Rue de la Loi/Wetstraat, pass underneath the park, the latter partly in an open section in front of the arch. The nearest metro stations are Schuman to the west of the park, and Merode immediately to the east.

== See also ==
- Neoclassical architecture in Belgium
- History of Brussels
- Culture of Belgium
- Belgium in the long nineteenth century
