= Joe Gruttola =

American BMX Flatland Freestyler

Cycling career
- Sport: Cycling
- Discipline: BMX freestyle
- Role: Rider

Professional team
- Haro Team: 1986-1988

Joe Gruttola is an American BMX Flatland Freestyler.

Gruttola started his freestyle career in 1986 during the initial AFA sanctioned freestyle contests on Long Island. Gruttola competed in several 1987 American Freestyle Association sponsored events held throughout the United States. He would go on to win and place in many of the AFA Masters series contests in the 14-15 expert and 16-18 expert flatland division. In 1987 he was sponsored by Haro, and is featured in the 1988 Haro Team Video alongside Matt Hoffman, Rick Moliterno and others.

== Accomplishments ==
Sponsored by Full Factory Haro, co sponsored by Vision Street Wear.

1986
AFA Masters

Round 4, 5th place 14-15 expert flatland.
Finals, 1st place 14-15 expert flatland.

1987
ABA Freestyle Nationals Round 2, 1st place 16 and over expert flatland.
AFA Masters

Round 1, 1st place 14-15 expert flatland.
Round 5, 1st place 16-18 expert flatland.
Finals, 3rd place 16-18 expert flatland,
Points Champion 16-18 expert flatland.

1988
AFA Masters

Round 1, 2nd place 16 expert flatland.
Round 3, 3rd place 17 expert flatland.
Round 5, 1st place 17 expert flatland.
Round 6, 2nd place 17 expert flatland.
Round 8, 4th place 17 expert flatland.
