= Flatland BMX =

Cycle Sport

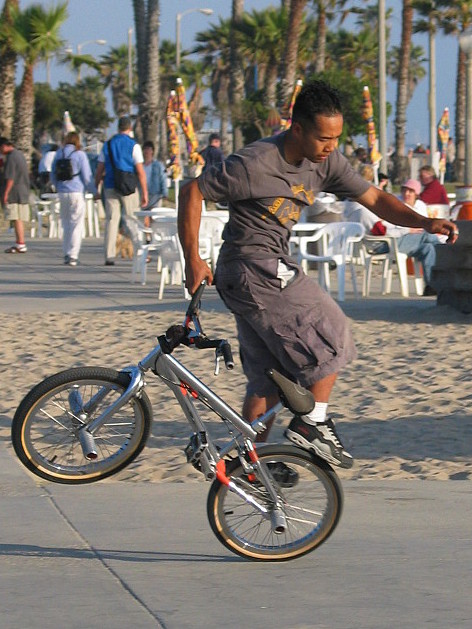
Flatland BMX rider, 'scuffing' the back wheel while performing a "lard yard", at Santa Monica beach

Flatland is a freestyle BMX riding style performed on smooth flat surfaces that do not include any ramps, jumps, or grindrails. It is sometimes described as a form of artistic cycling with a blend of breakdancing.

Flatland occupies a position somewhat removed from the rest of freestyle BMX. Enthusiasts are often spend several hours a day perfecting their techniques.

Flatland also differs from the other events in that the terrain used is nothing but a smooth, flat surface. Tricks are performed by spinning and balancing on the bike in a variety of unexpected positions. Riders almost always use either knurled/grip taped aluminum or plastic pegs to stand on to manipulate the bike into even more imaginative positions. Flatland bikes typically have a shorter wheelbase than other freestyle bikes. This shorter wheelbase requires less effort to make the bike spin or to position the bike on one wheel. One of the primary reasons flatlanders often ride only flatland is the decreased stability of using their shorter bikes on ramps, dirt and street.

A variety of options is commonly found on flatland bikes. The most unifying feature of flatland bikes is the use of four pegs, one on the end of each wheel axle. Flatlanders will choose to run a front brake (or a dual front brake; one front brake with two brake levers using one brake cable), front and rear brakes, or no brakes at all, depending on stylistic preference.

== History ==
Flatland originated from three pioneers: R. L. Osborn, Bob Haro, and Bob Morales. R. L. Osborn was a fan favorite in the mid-1980s, being the highest-paid BMX flatland professional ever after signing a contract with General Bicycles for around US$100,000. Bob Haro went on to become founder of Haro Bicycles. Bob Morales was the founder of the once elite American Freestyle Association. The AFA was the dominating league for both professional and amateur flatland and quarter pipe events. While there were several amateur AFA events the Masters series contest, held throughout the US was the biggest pro/am flatland/quarter pipe event of the time.

Flatland's roots can be dated back to the 1950s. Flatland has gone through many stylistic changes since its beginnings in the late 1970s. Riders once wore full protective gear and full face helmets, starred in feature-length films such as Rad (film), and performed in large-scale events such as NBA halftimes. Following the decline in popularity and subsequent recession in most action sports at the end of the 80s, flatland went "underground". It resurfaced in the late 90s with the return of media attention in the form of events such as the X Games. Flatland was dropped from the X Games and other large-scale events in the early 2000s, forcing the sport/artform to become more independently run and owned. Most flatland companies and events now exist outside of other BMX circles, although there is still, somewhat limited, coverage in mainstream BMX magazines and videos.
With the removal of flatland from events such as the XGames, many independent event organizers have stepped up and taken flatland to the masses through creative, independently organized events such as the Red Bull Circle Balance, Circle Cow, and BMX Masters events in Europe, the Elevation Flatland series and Voodoo Jams in the US, and smaller "jams" such as the Athens Jam and Hollywood Jams which take place in the US. These independent events and jams are what has helped keep flatland "alive" and thriving over the years.

== Decline ==
Extremely aggressive marketing is responsible for the decline of flatland in the US in the late 1980s. Many major sponsorships and BMX companies at this time were simply being pioneered from scratch. Teams were hired to scout out BMX racing events and set up their own mini shows in the parking lots. Sponsorship booths over-promoted the sale of helmets, pads, and other gear that is simply not required for being a successful flatland rider. Customers could see what was going on and once people caught on to this no one wanted to pay such a high price for protective gear when the only thing truly required to learn/ride flatland is shin guards,4 pegs and a BMX. Flatland only declined as a competitive sport and only appeared to fade out due to no media attention on television after the late 1980s. Instead flatland in the early 1990s took on a new type of popularity with the poorer to mid-class Americans as a pass-time activity done in mostly parking lots, garages, and driveways throughout the US.

== Flatland bikes ==
Although the flatland bicycle is similar to most other BMX bicycles, flatland is often performed with specially designed frames with geometry (head tube angle, top tube length, etc.) suited to the needs of flatlanders. Front and rear bolt-on pegs, a hollow compression bolt on the forks for the front brake cable, and a rear brake cable detangler or Gyro to allow the bars to rotate endlessly without tangling the brake cables. Also invented specifically for flatland riding is the rear hub mechanism known as a freecoaster, which allows the rear wheel to roll backward without engaging the hub and making the cranks rotate backward as they would on a normal freewheel or cassette style hub. Other technical bicycle setup specifics can include zero offset forks, narrow handlebars, very high pressure tires (100psi and higher), and a very small front sprocket (18-28 teeth).

== Style ==
A Flatland BMX rider practicing in Japan, 2017

In competition, talent and skill are judged by the ability to maintain coordination, and balance while performing a variety of difficult and elegant moves. There are usually several categories for judging purposes which can include:

- Number of touches: The number of times a trick is not completed and/or the number of touches of the foot to the ground
- Number of tricks completed in the allotted time
- Difficulty of the tricks, which can be very subjective, as flatland techniques have in many ways become as refined as those in figure skating or breakdancing
- Originality of the tricks performed, which again can be somewhat subjective
- Style and flow, or how smoothly and/or stylishly moves are performed during the contest run
- Showmanship: The ability to present your routine to the crowd. Hugo Gonzales and Dave Vanderspek, while not the top pros were known for their elaborate showmanship and antics.

Flatland is an involving, time-consuming discipline in which the rider learns different balance/counterbalance points and center-of-gravity in motion techniques through repetition and trial-and-error. Some tricks can be learned in hours, while others may take years to master.

Various riders emphasize different aspects of the discipline: the artistic nature of flatland and the originality of tricks, the number and difficulty of tricks, or the simple enjoyment of the activity. Only contest riders need to be concerned with the competitive side of the discipline, as there are many riders who prefer doing shows, taking parts in videos, or simply riding with their friends and enjoying themselves.

Riders usually pedal a few times for speed, and then perform various stunts often involving difficult and/or awkward stances on pegs, mounted to the axles of their front or back wheels. Pegs are aluminum or plastic tubes, which are bolted onto both sides of the front and back axles. When flatland riding first began, most riders would do one trick and then return to the pedals. However, by combining different body and bicycle positions into "combos" and "linking" them together, riders began to do several tricks in a row without stopping between each move. Flatland riding is now usually a combination of many different kinds of moves, often linked together non-stop as the rider goes through as many, as 10-12 consecutive moves, and position/direction changes, before returning to the pedals.

== Flatland tricks ==
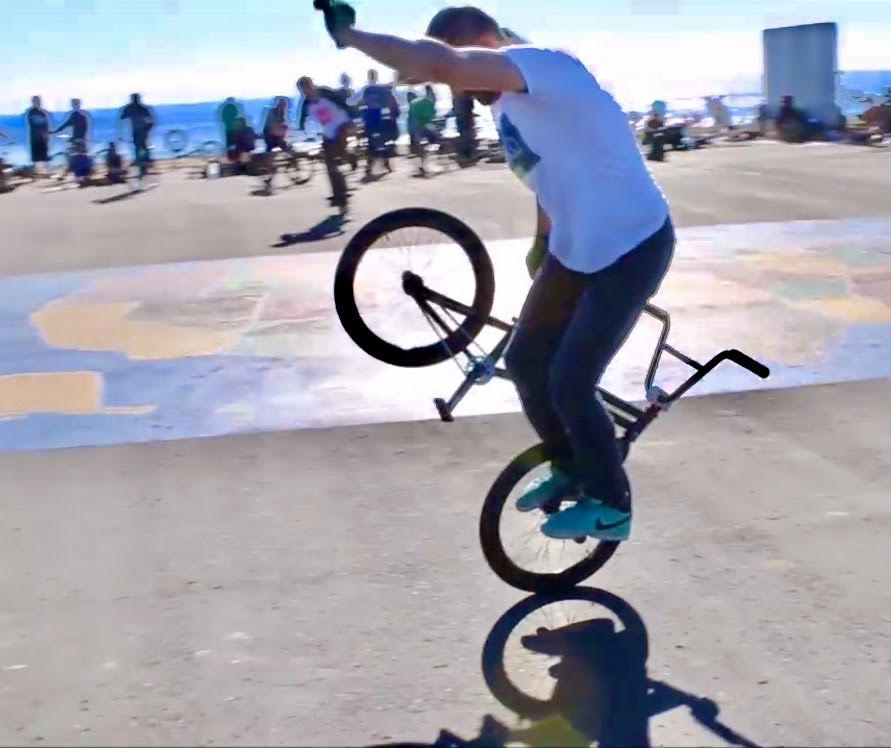
Joe Cicman

Flatland tricks are given names, usually by the first person to invent it. For example, the first flatland "bunnyhop tailwhip" was first landed in a Burger King parking lot by Bill Nitschke, and there named a "whopper". Terry Adams invented a trick following Hurricane Katrina (since Terry lives in Louisiana), and named his new trick "The Katrina".

The name may be modified (referencing whether it is rolled, scuffed, g-turned, stationary, etc.) or included in a list of other tricks, with "links" such as "bar-flip into" or "jump to", to indicate a combination, often shortened to "combo."

These names generally apply to popular positions, or combinations of tricks.

== Tricks and spins ==
- Endo: The original flatland trick. Done by either sharply applying the front brakes at low speed or running the front wheel into a curb causing the rear wheel to lift off of the ground above the front. An Alternate way to do this is by jamming either foot into the fork. Also used to gain momentum to lead into other tricks like the Decade or the Backside walkaround.
- Miami Hopper: The rider stands on the pedals and grasps the seat tip in right hand, and the front brake lever in left hand. The rider quickly applies the front brake and simultaneously rotates the handlebars 90 degrees counterclockwise towards the seat and pulls up sharply on the seat. This will cause the rear of the bike to rise up and seemingly flip over the front. If landed correctly, the front wheel will lay parallel to the ground and the right handlebar grip will be balancing on the ground leaving the rider perched above the rear wheel. From this position, the rider can make various poses, kick the bike out to the side and lay it down, or lean back sharply and reverse the trick and ride away. Note: The hands and handlebar directions would be reversed if the bike was set up with the front brake lever on the right hand side. (Uncommon set up for US riders)
- Cherry Picker: The rider places a foot on the rear tire behind the bottom bracket and swings their other leg over the head tube and rests the other foot on the seat tube. Then either using the handlebars for stability or clamping the legs tightly, the rider bounces up and down causing the entire bike to hop on the rear wheel.
- Boomerang: The rider applies the front brakes and jumps from either the pedals or rear dropouts while tucking the legs into the chest and spins around with the handlebars 360 degrees. *note* Can be done without brakes, also known as a Rolling Boomerang. A variant of the Rolling Boomerang exists known as the Stick Man, with the rider leaving the legs straight out and to the side while locking the handlebars level with the hips.
- Fork Glide: The rider stands on the front peg and spins 180 degrees. From here the rider can use their foot on the tire to move along. This trick is commonly used as a starting point to other tricks.
- Steamroller: Forward Fork Glide on the front wheel holding the seat, usually rode into with a Half Lash.
- Footjam Tailwhip: The rider uses the front brake to swing the frame 360 degrees around while keeping one foot on the front tire.
- Fire Hydrant: The rider performs a basic Fork Glide and then swings the frame back round towards them.
- G-Turn: Whipping the frame into a spinning Endo with feet on the pedals.
- Decade: Lifting the front wheel up and jumping over the head tube and landing with the left foot on the top tube to ride out.
- Rolaid: Rolling Decade. Brakeless. The Decade and Rolaid can be done in multiples.
- Backside Walkaround: The rider lifts the front wheel up while standing on the rear axle pegs. Using the outside leg, the rider brings that leg in a crossing pattern in between the bike and riders' body. The rider then swings the leg around and over the head tube and places that foot on the seat tube. In a very precarious position, the rider then brings around the other leg from behind and over the head tube ending on the other side of the bike in an almost backwards position. *note* Can be done one-handed, with only the right hand on the grip and the other hand thrown out similar to a bull rider.
- Whiplash: Rolling Tailwhip. Can be done without brakes. Can be done in multiples.
- Cliffhanger: A rolling Endo with either foot on the front pegs and the torso behind the seat for a balance point.
- Hang Five: Placing one foot on one of the front pegs and pulling the frame up until seat meets contact and a balance point is established; a rolling Endo. The foot not on the peg is used as a counterbalance.
- Hang Ten: Similar to the Hang Five, but with both feet on the front pegs.
- Hang Nothing: Similar to the Hang Five, but without either foot on the peg. Both feet are used as a counterbalance.
- Elbow Glide: Placing one foot on one of the front pegs with one side of the body and the opposite elbow tucked with the seat to control the balance point.
- Hitchhiker: Tilting the bike completely forward on the front wheel while rolling, standing both feet on the front pegs; holding the bike in front of the rider, by the underside of the backwheel or holding an axle peg.
- Backpacker: Related to the Hitchhiker, but with the body positioned forward with the bike behind the body.
- Cow maneuver or Smith Decade: Placing the frame up and tucking a rotation on the pegs backwards into the pedals first performed by Gerry Smith; this trick has many variants and can be performed without brakes (Chase Gouin).
- Surfer: Placing one foot on the seat and the other foot on the handlebars' crossbar while rolling; popular in some videos and commercials.
- Scurfer: Same as the Surfer, but with only one foot on the handlebars' crossbar.
- Death Truck: Rolling a back Peg Wheelie and pulling the body over the handlebars; one of the most feared tricks in flatland not because of its difficulty, but because of the potential tangled bail.
- Bar Ride: Standing up while both feet are on the grips of the bars or the crossbar and using only the torso and hands for a balance point while rolling.
- Backwards Rubber Ride: Similar to a bar ride in execution, but with the rider standing on the handlebars facing the rear of the bike and rolling backwards.
- Bar Hop: While standing up on the pedals, the rider jumps up and over the handlebar crossbar while tucking their knees into the chest. Upon landing the buttocks on the crossbar, one can scuff the front wheel and continue to roll or climb back over the handlebars.
- Backyard: A scuffing trick performed by a foot push and control on the tires, while facing away from the frame on the back pegs.
- Gerator (also "lardyard"): Similar to the backyard, but holding on to one handlegrip while scuffing and more off the side and back while scuffing in a circle.
- Megaspin: Spinning on the back tire in a circular motion.
- Front Yard: Front yards are one of the basis tricks for front wheel scuffing. They are pretty easy to learn, and then one can take them one handed and no-handed. Rolling very slowly, step over the bars with scuffing foot and rest it on the front tire. The other leg/foot is on the pedal. When ready, apply the brakes and put the foot firmly on the front tire getting ready to scuff. Move the other foot off the pedal and onto the front corresponding peg. Braking and moving the other foot need to happen at the same time while pushing a little bit forward on the bars to get the backend to come a little off the ground. Now start a scuffing pattern giving the tire a little kick forward, then hitting the brake and repeating, trying to keep the arms firm and hold the position locked out. When satisfied, give the tire a kick but and let the backend fall to the ground, step back to the pedal and pick the other leg back over the bars.
- Pogos: Stand on the back pegs and do and endo, then pick up the front wheel and hop.
- Lawn Mower/Can-Can Lawn Mower: Do an Endo, as the back wheel hit the ground, turn the handlebars towards the rider and kick the seat down with the right foot. The Can-Can Lawn Mower is when one kicks the leg out to the side instead of putting it on the seat.
- Flail: Do a Rolling Boomerang, halfway through, put the right foot on the front peg and the left foot on the back peg, then flip the bar and pivot the body around.
- Squeaker: Put the left foot on the front peg and the other foot on the pedal, grab the front brake, and put the foot on the tire. When the foot comes off the tire, grab the front brake.
- Pinky Squeak: A Tailwhip with a kick, can be done in multiples.
- Tomahawk/Framestand Tomahawk: Lift the leg over the bar, grab the brake, spin around, then grab the seat and start squeaking back. Do a Tomahawk, grab the brake and put the foot on the frame.
- Stick B (also "Dump Truck"): Do an endo, turn the handlebar put the left hand on the peg, take the other hand off the grip and put it on the peg and start scuffing.
- Steamboat: Steamroller with the leg over the bar, can be linked with Steamroller
  - Note: These tricks mentioned are a few within the art/sport of flatland. These tricks and others have variants and depend upon the style of the rider performing them. Also, these tricks can be linked or combined into sequences or routines that could not otherwise be titled as a single trick.

== Notable riders ==
- Terry Adams
- Mat Dagu (also known as Ahmad Shaiful Azis)
- Chad Degroot
- Joe Gruttola
- Kevin Jones
- Tim Knoll
- Martti Kuoppa

== See also ==
- BMX
- BMX bike
- Freestyle BMX
- Artistic cycling
- Glossary of cycling
