= Groot (disambiguation) =

Groot is a fictional character from comic books by Marvel Comics.

Groot may also refer to:

- Groot (Marvel Cinematic Universe), film adaptation
- Groot (surname), Dutch surname
- Hohgrat, mountain

== See also ==
- De Groot
