= Tim Knoll =

Freestyle BMX rider

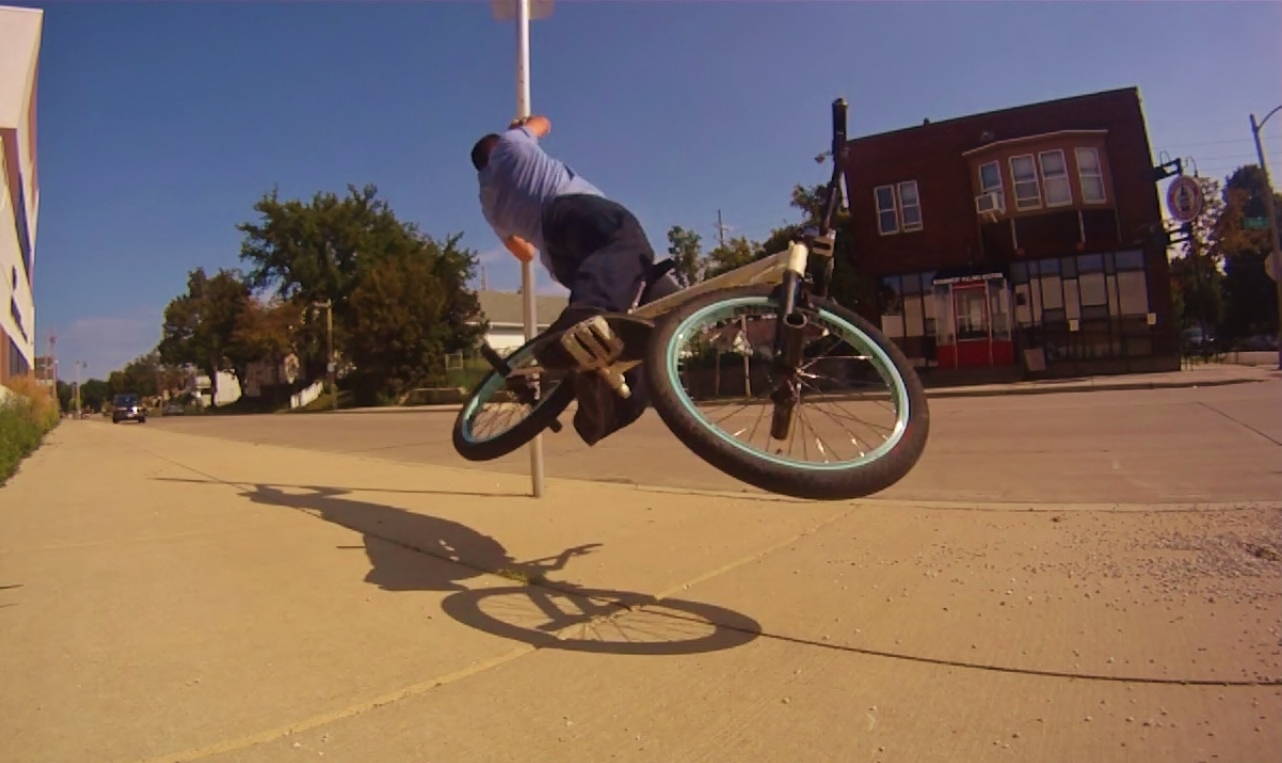
Tim Knoll's "poleswing" trick

Tim Knoll is a freestyle BMX rider based in Milwaukee, Wisconsin. Known for his unique style that combines flatland and street tricks with acrobatic maneuvers, Knoll uses different aspects of the urban environment as apparatuses to perform his tricks. He gained international recognition from a few online videos that have each amassed millions of views. After his Original Bike Tricks video went viral, several of his video clips have been featured on television shows throughout the world, most notably The Tonight Show. He performed on Star King (SBS) and set a Guinness World Record on Guinness China Night (CCTV-1). Knoll has been featured in online video ads for Ford, Genesis, Red Bull, GoPro, Contiki Tours, as well as a mobile-only campaign for Doritos Jacked 3D. An article on Red Bull's website describes him as one of the most creative riders in the world. He gave a TEDx Talk in 2016.
