= Mat Hoffman =

American BMX rider (born 1972)

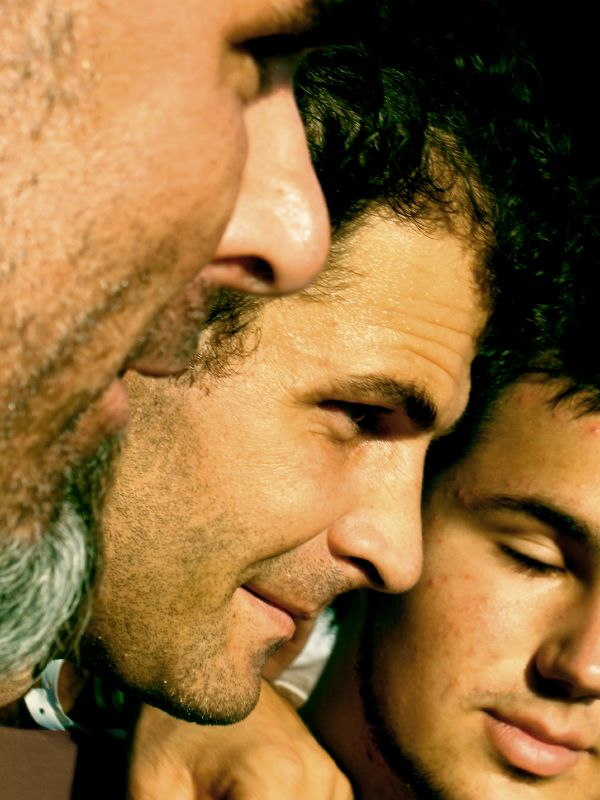
- Hoffman (center) in 2006
- Born: Mathew Hoffman; January 9, 1972 (age 54); Edmond, Oklahoma, U.S.
- Other name: The Condor
- Occupations: BMX rider, organizer
- Years active: 1986–present
- Height: 182 cm (6 ft 0 in)
- Spouse: Jaci Hoffman (m. 1993)
- Children: 2
- Website: mathoffman.com

Medal record

Summer X Games

Representing United States
Gold medal – first place	1995 Newport	BMX Vert
Gold medal – first place	1996 Newport	BMX Vert
Silver medal – second place	2002 Philadelphia	BMX Vert
Bronze medal – third place	1997 San Diego	BMX Vert
Bronze medal – third place	2000 San Francisco	BMX Vert
Bronze medal – third place	2001 Philadelphia	BMX Vert

Mathew Hoffman (born January 9, 1972) is an American professional BMX rider who is considered one of the best vert ramp riders in the history of the sport. He was nicknamed "The Condor" and ran the BMX Freestyle brand Hoffman BMX Bikes based in Oklahoma City, Oklahoma. He was a sponsored rider for Skyway and then Haro Bikes before starting his own brand.

== Early life ==
Mathew Hoffman was born on January 9, 1972, in Edmond, Oklahoma, to Joni (Geovanna Teresa Papa) and Matthew Hoffman. He has two sisters, Lina and Gina, and two brothers, Todd and Travis.

Hoffman started out racing motocross with his motorcycle being a Kawasaki KDX 80.1, and eventually moving through various other motorcycles such as Yamaha YZ 80 and a Honda CB 80.

In 1982 at the age of ten, Hoffman and his brothers built their first quarterpipe from plans in an issue of BMX Action Magazine. Hoffman began entering BMX freestyle competitions in 1985 around the state of Oklahoma as an amateur. Growing up Mat was a dedicated basketball, football player and wrestler, but around this time he gave up on those and committed completely to BMX.

When he was 11, he got his first real BMX bike, a red Mongoose. A few years later with a group of friends they started the Edmond Bike Shop Trick Team. Around this time his father and uncle built a new nine foot quarterpipe for the trick team that they would haul around to events and put on shows.

== Career ==
=== Independent beginnings ===
In the summer of 1985, a Mountain Dew commercial began airing that featured pro California riders Eddie Fiola, Ron Wilkerson and R.L. Osborn. Hoffman said, "Its flight lasted all summer, and Travis, Steve, and I would surf around channels trying to avoid the shows but find the advertisement. My mom saw how psyched we'd get and called the local Pepsi bottling and distribution center to talk about creating a local form of promotion in sync with the commercial. A few days later we set up our ramp in the Pepsi distributorship parking lot and did a show in full uniform for a couple of executives from the plant. They were stoked, and we were in. We painted a big Mountain Dew logo on our ramp, got jerseys and stickers, and they set us up with a sponsorship through Edmond Bike Shop to keep us flush with parts and inner tubes. In exchange for the Mountain Dew support, we'd do shows at random supermarkets that sold the soda."

In 1986, the Haro Freestyle Team came through Oklahoma on their tour with Dennis McCoy and Tony Murray. Hoffman said, "They let us ride their ramp with them before the demo, and I unleashed everything I had to impress the famous factory superstars. They paid me the ultimate honor, asking me to ride with them during their demo. This was the equivalent of an aspiring local guitarist being asked by Metallica to come on stage and jam. Afterward, Dennis took Steve Swope and me to dinner and announced that he wanted to bring me on the road for the rest of their tour. I was so blown away I could barely stammer out "sure," and during dinner I was already mentally packing my gear bag for the tour. Dennis made a phone call to tell the guys at Haro the good news. He came back with a weird look on his face that said the call hadn't gone well. Today, I understand how silly it must have sounded when he phoned in his request: "Hey, I found some random fourteen-year-old kid in Oklahoma who rules. Can we pick him up and take him on tour around the rest of the United States?"

Mat Hoffman first came to the attention of people outside of Edmond, Oklahoma, when a letter and photo appeared in the Street Talk section of Freestylin' Magazine's August 1986 issue. In the letter he mentions being sponsored by Mountain Dew and the image shows him pulling off a one footer over a nine foot quarter pipe.

In 1986 Hoffman entered two national freestyle competitions as an unsponsored rider. The first was the AFA Master Series Round 2 in his home state of Oklahoma in August. Mat was prepared to enter as an amateur but his father convinced him to enter as an expert for the competition. Mat was one of the only riders to wear a full face helmet and JT motocross body armor. Once he began riding the spectators and other riders understood why he had on the protection. He finished first in 14-15 expert ramp and stole the show. He had learned to ride BMX with a few friends and with no professionals for reference other than from magazine pictures. He remembers: "When I got to that contest I went 'woah, I guess I am going higher than everyone else'."

Hoffman entered his second national competition on June 29, 1986, at the General Bicycles/AFA Freestyle Championships at Madison Square Garden in New York City. He finished first in 14-15 expert ramp category riding a blue Haro Sport and was the rider everyone was talking about. In the November 1986 issue of Freestylin' Magazine coverage of the event, Hoffman received a two page photo spread because of his performance. After the competition he was solicited by over 15 sponsors/bike manufactures to ride for them. Hoffman said, "Before I'd caught my breath after my run, the team managers from Skyway and Haro had approached with sponsorship offers. Haro wanted to try me out on their B Team, and let me work my way up. Skyway didn't operate like that, I would be part of their factory squad and get to go on tour, get flown to contests, and draw a salary."

=== Skyway years ===
In July 1986, Hoffman signed a one-year sponsorship deal with Skyway Recreation. "I signed on the line with Skyway and was soon flown to their headquarters in Redland, California. The team manager had been hyping my skills, and the owners wanted to witness their new kid in action. During the show I slammed so hard I snapped my other collarbone and wound up in the hospital. Luckily, they decided to keep me on the team."

After healing his collarbone, Hoffman made his Skyway debut in August at the IBMXF World Freestyle Championships in Vancouver. This competition was held in conjunction with Expo 86 the World's Fair. The freestyle contest was sanctioned by the International BMX Federation and run by the Canadian Freestyle Association using AFA rules. The majority of the 72 participants were from the U.S. and Canada, with one rider from Switzerland and one from France. Skyway, Mongoose and Kuwahara sent full squads of combatants, and while most of the other major factory teams had a couple of riders in attendance, there were some serious absentees. Hoffman finishing second behind Kuwahara's Tim Rogers.

On December 13, 1986, Hoffman rode in his first 2-Hip King of Vert contest at Ron Wilkerson's The Enchanted Ramp in Encinitas, California. There were six pros (Wilkerson, Todd Anderson, Mike Dominguez, Eddie Fiola, Brian Blyther and Josh White and the expert division had riders such as Tim Rogers, Steve Broderson, Marc McGlynn and Hoffman. It was thought that the contest would be a battle between Rodgers and Broderson, "but they weren't on the same level as Matt Hoffman. Matt wasn't 15 yet, but he was by far the raddest guy in the class. He was popping off eight to nine-foot aerials, no-footed cancans, regular cancans, no handers and all sorts of other tricks. He was unbelievable. He was actually radder during practice than he was in his run (like he was at the Velodrome), but still rad enough in his run that there was no doubt who had won. If he stays in freestyle long enough, it's virtually a sure thing he'll be the raddest guy alive in a couple of years. He's kind of shy and quiet when you meet him, not at all what you'd expect from someone so radical."

While only 15 years old, Hoffman began construction on an indoor half pipe in his father's medical supply distribution warehouse. He dubbed it The Secret Ninja Ramp and it was made for year round training as opposed to shoveling the snow off his previous ramp. His father donated the space and Hoffman's Skyway salary paid for the materials.

=== Haro years ===
In 1988, at the age of 16, Hoffman signs a one-year deal to ride for Haro Bikes after the departure of Dennis McCoy and Joe Johnson from the Haro roster freeing up the budget. Hoffman said, "For years, I'd wanted to ride for Haro – the first company to create a freestyle bike – run by the guy who invented the sport. It was a pure respect thing. Adding to the appeal, Haro's roster of sponsored riders was the coolest in the world: Ron Wilkerson, Brian Blyther, Dave Nourie, Joe Johnson, Dennis McCoy... it was the dream team.

Around this time, a new manager entered the bike scene with ambitions of bringing mainstream-level sponsorship opportunities to riders. Despite limited experience in BMX, she began managing several riders, including Joe Johnson and Dennis McCoy. Rumors of major sponsorship deals led McCoy and Johnson to leave the Haro team, creating openings in Haro’s amateur and professional ranks and freeing up part of the team’s rider budget.

As events unfolded over the following months, the expected opportunities failed to materialize. It was difficult to watch two of the sport’s top riders paying their own travel expenses, wearing Adidas tracksuits, and doing demos at Chrysler dealerships to earn extra income while waiting for a rumored Pepsi/Huffy sponsorship deal that ultimately never happened.

But Dennis and Joe's lapse in judgment was my gain-I made a phone call to Rhino and secured a spot on the Haro team. I would remain classified as an am for at least the rest of the year, but I got a pay increase and was making about $50,000 in annual salary -approximately ten times what I earned with Skyway."

At the 1989 2-Hip King of Vert finals in Irvine, California, Hoffman competes in first contest as a professional while still competing as an amateur. The amateurs rode first and Hoffman placed first then turned pro after his run and took first in the pro class. He also won the highest air of the contest and also finished the year as 1988 #1 amateur. An article in Ride Magazine commented: "What's left to say about a guy who ignored all established limits and redefined vert riding – at age 15[?]". In 1989 he won the first contest he entered as a professional and took home a $2,200 check, after winning the amateur contest of the day, taking the year title in the amateur class.

==== First 900 ====
On March 25, 1989, in Kitchener, Ontario, Hoffman lands the first 900 ten years before Tony Hawk landed one at X Games V. It was only Hoffman's second pro contest and first after quitting Haro. Hoffman had only attempted the 900 once before.

In early 1990, nearly a year after quitting Haro and riding independently on a SE P.K. Ripper, Hoffman re-signs with Haro. Hoffman said, "I was sponsorless for about a year. It was a learning experience -I learned how to fix my parts really well."" But in 1991, a year later, Hoffman would leave Haro a second and last time before starting his own company Hoffman Bikes. "When Bob Haro left in 87, I was there 88 and 89, now it's Jim Fordes company and Jim has to make money and these people don't know where they're going with Haro, they don't know how to reinvent. Haro weren't about reinventing, they were just about growth, and I was about reinventing. I was the reason why Haro had a bash guard and had pegs coming out of the forks, they were my designs. I was trying to do new things for Haro, but I would design something and by the time it got to the table and back to me, it was not what I was saying. I was getting knocked out daily, often because of bad parts. Whenever it was about designing parts, I can't tell someone how to do it, I have to do it myself. I could have stayed at Haro and it would have been easier but I would never have got what I believed in, I'd always have to compromise. I never got into BMX to compromise. I got into BMX to dream and keep it pure whatever I dreamed about."

=== Hoffman Bikes ===
In late 1991 after leaving Haro, Mat Hoffman began the seeds of Hoffman Bikes. Linn Kasten the founder and engineer of Redline Bicycles helped Hoffman develop a frame and fork and made him five prototype Condor sets in his shop in California. Hoffman remembers, "I went to Linn's house where my crude drawings became intense technical discussions. We tuned the geometry in the drawing and discussed the dilemma of weight versus strength. I wanted a bulletproof bike, but it had to fly. There were incidents in the past where I'd broken three brand-new bikes in one day -and was sick of that crap. I wanted top quality, which meant using American made 4130 aircraft grade chrome-moly tubing, the best money can buy. I was also stoked that it was going to be built in America, which was a rarity for freestyle bikes. A couple of weeks later Linn's machine shop had built me five prototype Condor frames, one for Steve Swope, Rick Thorne, Dave Mirra, Davin Hallford, and me. Our mission was to try and break them. The Condor was good. It was quick, it was stiff, it had clean angles, but more than anything, it was built to last. (rode my prototype frame and fork set for seven months, trying everything in my power to bring it to its knees. The bike held up to flatbottom landings, rooftop drops, handrails, gaps, dirt, street, ditches, extreme weather conditions, name-calling, and giant ramps. I caused my body way more harm than my bike, and the rest of the prototypes held up, too. Midway through the testing phase, I made a couple of minor improvements and declared the design phase done. Time to see if the public would buy them."

In the summer of 1992, the first Hoffman Bikes production frames became available to the public. Although the prototypes were made by Kasten, Hoffman switched to SE Racing for manufacturing. Hoffman said, "Precision materials and craftsmanship came with a steep price tag, and I found out I couldn't afford to have Linn Kastan's shop do production. Mike Devitt of SE Racing saved the day. Mike was another old school BMX guy, and he'd been through the ups and downs of the industry with another legendary company, SE. Their machine shop could make a limited run of custom frame and fork sets. The condition was, I had to pay for half the batch up front, the other half on delivery "Make me two hundred of these," I told Devitt and sent off the schematic for the Condor with a down payment check for $18,000."

He developed the Bicycle Stunt (BS) series to give riders a place to compete and to showcase their talents. ESPN joined with Hoffman Promotions in 1995 to produce and televise the series each year.

The growth of Hoffman Promotions gave birth to the Hoffman Sports Association (H.S.A.), the organizing body for BMX Freestyle events worldwide, such as ESPN's X Games and all international X Games bicycle-stunt events.

Hoffman has produced, directed and hosted several TV series for ESPN including Kids in the Way, HBtv, and Mat's World. In February 2008, Hoffman produced and co-hosted Mat Hoffman's Evel Knievel Tribute with Johnny Knoxville, which aired on MTV and featured record-breaking stunts by Travis Pastrana, Trigger Gunn, Allan Cooke and Davin Halford.

On April 2, 2023, Hoffman hosted a BMX stunt show during the inaugural Thunder Ride and Bike Fest held by the Oklahoma City Thunder. Kenny Belaey, Terry Adams and Ryan Williams joined Hoffman.

== Achievements ==
Hoffman is responsible for building the sport for decades, providing support to the biggest names in the industry, including Dave Mirra, Jay Miron, Kevin Robinson, Chad Kagy, Seth Kimbrough, Taj Mihelich, Brad Simms, Anthony Napolitan, Mike Escamilla, Rick Thorne, Kevin Jones, Chase Gouin, Pete Augustin, Day Smith, and Art Thomason, among others.

Hoffman and his team were selected to take part in the closing ceremonies of the 1996 Summer Olympic Games in Atlanta in a production called "Sport as Art". In 1999, H.S.A. developed Mat Hoffman's Crazy Freakin' Bikers Series (CFB), which provides amateur and professional Freestyle bikers a venue in which they can compete. Not only does the H.S.A. promote, organize and host the series, but it also produces all the television programming for the CFB Series, which is aired on ESPN2.

The H.S.A. organizes BMX Freestyle portions of annual U.S. and international events, including the X Games and all international X Games qualifiers. The year 2005 marked the 14th consecutive year of competition production for Hoffman Promotions.

In 2001, Hoffman competed at the X Games, earning the bronze medal. He stunned the industry and fans, alike, when he set another record by successfully completing the first-ever No-handed 900 at the 2002 X Games, resulting in the silver medal.

Hoffman was the first person to ride an oversized ("Big") ramp in 1993 with his first High Air attempt off of a 24-foot quarter pipe. On one of his runs, he tore his spleen, and had he not gotten to a hospital within five minutes, he would have died. When Hoffman achieved 26.6 feet above the ramp in March 1999 to 2001, he had a team of four professional photographers, an elaborate scaffolding system to record the attempt at different angles and had an ABC Wide World of Sports camera crew on-site.

Hoffman is also credited with being the first person to perform a double peg grind down a handrail, as documented in the video Head First, released in 1991. The trick has gone on to be a foundation of modern-day street riding.

In 2005, Hoffman was elected president of the International BMX Freestyle Federation, the international governing body of BMX Freestyle. Also in 2005, the Mat Hoffman Action Sports Park opened in Oklahoma City, Oklahoma. It has since been recognized as one of the 10 best such parks in the nation.

In February 2018, Hoffman was inducted into the Oklahoma Sports Hall of Fame.

== Filmography ==
- Aggroman (BMX home video by Eddie Roman, 1989)
- Matt Hoffman's Head First (BMX home video by Eddie Roman, 1991, considered to be the greatest BMX video ever made)
- Colony of Summer (documentary, 1996)
- Keep Your Eyes Open, produced by Tamra Davis and starring Spike Jonze (2002)
- IMAX film Ultimate X (2002)
- XXX, a Rob Cohen film starring Vin Diesel (2002)
- Jackass: The Movie (2002)
- Jackass Number Two (2006)
- Jackass 2.5 (2007)
- Jackass Presents: Mat Hoffman's Tribute to Evel Knievel (2008)
- X Games 3D: The Movie (2009)
- Jackass 3D (2010)
- Jackass 3.5 (2011)
- Waiting for Lightning (documentary, 2012)
- Being Evel (documentary, 2015)

== Television ==
- Jackass (2 episodes, 2001)
- 2004 Kids' Choice Awards (2004)
- MTV Cribs (1 episode, 2004)
- Ned's Declassified School Survival Guide (2 episodes, 2004–2006)
- Extreme Makeover: Home Edition (2005)
- Wildboyz (2 episodes, 2005–2006)
- Jackassworld.com: 24 Hour Takeover (2008)
- Nitro Circus (3 episodes, 2009)
- A Tribute To Ryan Dunn (TV documentary, 2011)
- Epicly Later'd: Spike Jonze (TV documentary, 2022)

An ESPN 30 for 30 documentary entitled The Birth of Big Air, directed and produced by Jeff Tremaine, Johnny Knoxville, Spike Jonze and Hoffman himself, was released in July 2010.

Past projects include three shows produced by Hoffman – Mat Hoffman's Crazy Freakin' Stunt Show and Mat Hoffman's Aggro Circus at Universal Studios in Orlando, Florida, and Mat Hoffman's Danger Defying Daredevils at Six Flags Magic Mountain near Los Angeles, California.

The book The Ride of My Life documents Hoffman's story through 2001.

== Video games ==
Hoffman worked with Activision to produce the video games Mat Hoffman's Pro BMX (2001) and Mat Hoffman's Pro BMX 2 (2002), the latter released in conjunction with the Mat Hoffman's Pro BMX 2 Tour TV show, which aired on ESPN2 and is available on DVD and VHS.

Hoffman also appeared as an unlockable playable character in Tony Hawk's Pro Skater 4 (2002) and Tony Hawk's American Wasteland (2005), also produced by Activision.

== Music videos ==
- Weezer – Memories (2010)

== X Games competition history ==
GOLD (2) SILVER (1) BRONZE (3)
YEAR	X GAMES	EVENTS	RANK	MEDAL
1995	Extreme Games	BMX Vert	1st	Gold medal
1996	Summer X Games II	BMX Vert	1st	Gold medal
1997	Summer X Games III	BMX Vert	3rd	Bronze medal
1999	Summer X Games V	BMX Vert	7th	
2000	Summer X Games VI	BMX Vert	3rd	Bronze medal
2001	Summer X Games VII	BMX Vert	3rd	Bronze medal
2002	Summer X Games VIII	BMX Vert	2nd	Silver medal
2007	Summer X Games XIII	BMX Big Air	6th	
