= Kevin Jones (BMX rider) =

American freestyle BMX rider

Personal information
- Born: May 12, 1967 (age 59)

Cycling career
- Sport: Cycling
- Discipline: Freestyle BMX
- Role: Rider

Kevin Jones (born May 12, 1967) is a freestyle BMX rider. He was raised in York, Pennsylvania, and began riding BMX at age 11. In 1982, he started BMX racing, but he quit as he preferred dirt jumping.

In 1983, Jones formed a breakdancing group with fellow BMXers Mark Eaton, Mike Daily, Jamie McKulik, and Dale Mitzel, known as the Cardboard Lords. By April 1985, they had won several local competitions, including a York cable show called The Great York Talent Hunt. However, as breakdancing's popularity declined, Jones returned to BMX. Around this time, Daily introduced Jones to the Plywood Hoods freestyle team and the modern freestyle BMX. Jones acquired a similar bike, noting that components such as pegs and cable detangling rotors allowed for various tricks.

Jones was inducted into the BMX Hall of Fame in October 2022.

== Flatland career ==
In November 1986, Jones participated in the AFA Veladrome Finals as an expert. He performed new tricks, including the "Hang glider Boomerang", the "Chicken Hook Switch", and the "Insanity Roll". In the following months, Jones focused on inventing new tricks and continued to practice for the next competition in Austin.

In Austin, Texas, 1987, Jones entered his 3rd AFA Masters contest, debuting four of his own tricks: the Locomotive, the Trolley, the Standup Infinity Roll, and the Elephant Glide. Later that year at the velodrome in Carson, California, Jones debuted the Dump Truck trick.

Around this time, fellow Plywood Hood member and filmmaker Mark Eaton released the first of a series of freestyle BMX videos titled Dorkin' In York. The series captured flatland, ramps, and street riding. The series continued over the years, showcasing tricks from Jones and the Plywood Hoods, as well as coverage from major contests, some more private jams, and practice sessions. Eaton later released the entire series in a DVD boxset titled Dorkin' in York – The Complete DVD Collection.

In December 1988, Jones invented and performed the first "Hitch Hiker" trick, where the rider stands on the front pegs with the bike upside down, rolling on the front wheel, and holding the back tire. This was one of the first two-footed rolling tricks in flatland BMX.

In 1990, the Kudos granola bar company hired Jones to endorse its product on national television. That same year, Jones toured with the Wilkerson Airlines bike company. After these events, Jones became less active in the BMX scene. Aside from the Dorkin series, Jones had largely disappeared from public view.

In 1991, Jones rode with Chase Gouin, practicing to master every trick in both "switch" and "regular" modes on a quest to be able to link any trick into any other trick.

As of 2005, Jones continued to ride but did not re-enter the contest scene or tour for a major bike manufacturer.

In August 2006, it was announced that Jones would be creating a new version of the Big Daddy frame for Hoffman Bikes and rejoining the company's pro team. The new frame was called the Strowler.

Jones was inducted into the BMX Hall of Fame in October 2022.
