= Martti Kuoppa =

Martti Kuoppa is a Flatland BMX rider from Finland. He is widely recognized as one of the most skilled and most original riders in the history of the sport. He has invented and innovated many tricks on his quest for originality. He dominated the major contest scene between 2000 and 2002 as the winner of the BMX - flatland event at X Games VIII and has competed in and won a number of contests all over the world, such as the BMX Worlds in Germany in 2002. He has produced video parts and a solo DVD entitled Moments (Diversion TV). He was plagued by injury around 2005 due to practice of flatland. He has shared many online edits that show his continuing quest and hunger for originality. One project, Ground Tactics, provides a forum and contest for flatland riders around the world. At the heart of Ground Tactics is "hardcore flatland skills" and the promotion of originality and creativity. In 2012 Kuoppa announced his retirement from flatland riding to concentrate on other aspects of his life.

On October 25, 2015, Martti came out of retirement and won FlatArk, one of the biggest flatland BMX contests in recent years. The pro purse of this event was 5,000,000 JPY. This feat is one of his greatest accomplishments, given the competitors at this contest. Specifically, Martti was required to defeat the 2015 World Champion in order to advance to the final round of the competition.

Martti Kuoppa held two Guinness World Records for a time that he set in 2001: "Martti Kuoppa inscrit son nom au Guinness Book of Records with rolling no-footed on the front wheel of his bike for 100 meters and doing 59 pinky squeaks in a minute."

== Sources ==
- Martti Kuoppa Stem Lashes
- Martti Kuoppa Videos, Covers and Articles
- Transworld RideBMX Martti Kuoppa's New Link
- ESPN Action Sports BMX - Kuoppa and Jungle Rider
- GOT IT PEGGED FLATLANDERS' BIKES BEND TO THEIR WILL; 2001 ESPN X TRIALS
- Arm injuries and autographs
- Transworld: Martti Kuoppa Sets World Records
- BMX in the Guinness Book
- Longest distance wheelie on bicycle front wheel with feet off pedals - Currently set on Jan 28 2010 by Shane Badman (Australia)
- Most BMX pinky squeaks in one minute - Nov 24 2007 by Andreas Lindqvist (Sweden)
