= Dick de Groot =

Dutch-American painter (1920–2019)

Theodore Cornelius de Groot (December 15, 1920 – July 20, 2019), better known as Dick de Groot, was a Dutch-American painter.

He was born in Scheveningen, a beach suburb of The Hague in the Netherlands, in 1920. After the usual schooling that prepared him for the business world he decided to follow his old dream of being a painter. He studied five years at the Royal Academy of Fine Arts and took post-graduate classes in sculpture.

In 1959 de Groot came to America with his wife Hans and five children. He started painting gigantic faces, foaming glasses of beer and entire scenes up to eighty feet (24 m) long, for the advertising industry. A good year of this was enough and Dick went on his own, doing murals, portraits in oils or bronze, always on commission. A long period of involvement in business followed and he kept painting in spare time, without the pressure of having to make a living at it.

I refuse to paint "sure sellers", such as the cute, the corny, the romantic, the sentimental, the narrative. My favorite subject is the contemporary American urban scene, which I find exciting and uniquely suited to my taste. I like to use clues that give an illusion of space, or only a suggestion of it around the corner or beyond the hill. The opposites of mass and space, of volumes and voids intrigue me. They are the basis of my compositions. The urban landscape is rich in geometric planes that can be arranged in expressive combinations of color and light-dark values. I want to see each element in my work in harmony with the total. That includes clouds, traffic signs, telephone poles etc. I will change the subject to suit my purpose. Things are moved, added or left out in a process of translating reality into a painted and new reality, that may be subjectively interpreted.

He died in July 2019 at the age of 98.
