= Mat Dagu =

Ahmad Shaiful Azis, better known as Mat Dagu, is a Malaysian professional BMX rider. He has trained since the 1990s. He was selected to compete in the 2019 SEA Games in the Philippines.
