= The Sixties Unplugged =

2008 book by Gerard DeGroot

The Sixties Unplugged: A Kaleidoscopic History of a Disorderly Decade
- Author: Gerard DeGroot
- Language: English
- Subject: 1960s
- Genre: Non-fiction
- Publication date: 2008

The Sixties Unplugged: A Kaleidoscopic History of a Disorderly Decade is a 2008 book by Gerard DeGroot. In the book, DeGroot seeks to debunk the popular legend of the 1960s as a golden age of "peace, love and understanding", whose adherents worshiped at sacred sites in San Francisco, Amsterdam and New York City. He argues that the real winners from the 1960s were conservative populists like Richard Nixon and Ronald Reagan.

DeGroot questions the nostalgic perceptions of the decade, quoting heavily from notable figures of the day and providing contrasting commentary from latter day sources in addition to his own, often critical, voice.
