= Terry Adams (BMX rider) =

American cyclist (born 1983)

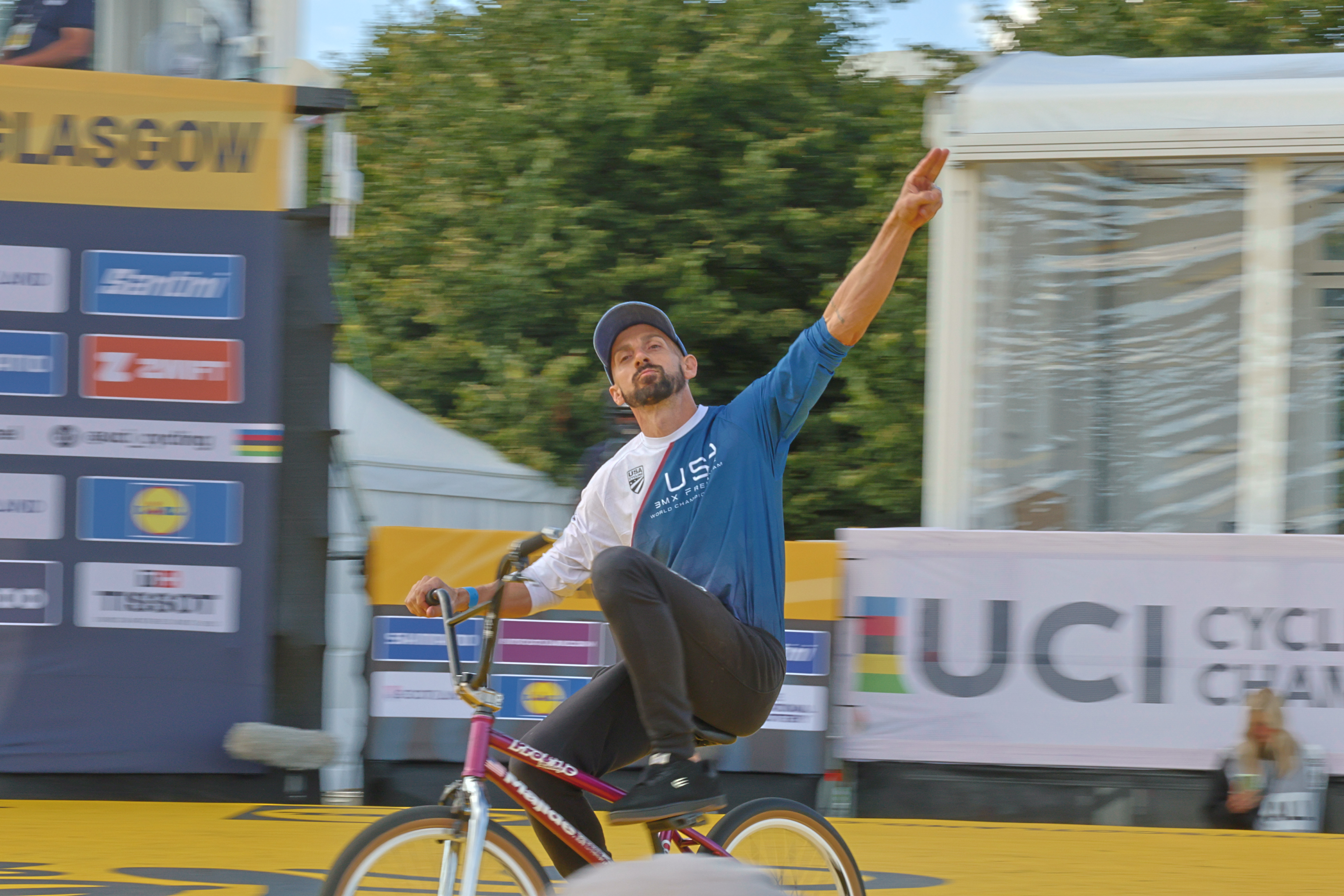
- Adams at the 2023 UCI BMX Freestyle World Championshipss

Personal information
- Nationality: American
- Born: September 9, 1983 (age 42) Hammond, Louisiana
- Occupation: BMX athlete

Sport
- Sport: Freestyle BMX, Dirt jumping, flatland BMX

Terry Adams (born August 9, 1983) is a professional flatland BMX bicyclist from Hammond, Louisiana. In 2024 author and filmmaker Billy Henrickle announced he had started working on Terry Adams memoirs and a documentary on Terry’s life and BMX career. The documentary titled “The Road Home” premiered in Terry’s hometown of Hammond, LA on September 20, 2025.

== Riding career ==
Adams started riding flatland BMX at the age of ten and turned pro at seventeen. He's been featured on the covers of several magazines throughout his career. In 2005 and 2008 he won Ride BMX magazine's NORA Cup award. In 2009 he appeared on The Ellen DeGeneres Show as well as an episode of Glee in 2011.

Terry Adams is a Red Bull Athlete.

== Pro Flatland Contest History ==
2001
22nd BS Round 3
2002
11th CFB Round 1
5th CFB Round 2
1st CFB Round 3
16th X Games
1st Flatland Fury
2003
10th Worlds
13th X Games
2004
1st Aspire Video Contest Round 2
4th Worlds
2nd Voodoo Jam
2005
1st Asian X Games
1st Urban Games
2006
13th Voodoo Jam
2007
3rd Circle of Balance
2nd Voodoo Jam
2010
1st Twilight Jam
