= Dirk de Groot =

Dutch footballer

Dirk de Groot (born 1943 in Amsterdam) is a Dutch retired football coach.

De Groot was born in the de Meer district of Amsterdam but became a football player at Catholic Volendam. He was later persuaded to join the football club in his neighborhood, AFC Ajax. The move to Ajax was recommended to him by his former trainer at Volemdam, Bram Appel. When de Groot was 27, he suffered a knee injury that ended his active football career.

He began training students as a hobby, without financial compensation. De Groot became an influential youth coach of later star players such as Frank Rijkaard and Dennis Bergkamp. His work with fellow trainer Sonny Silooy helped Ajax become A1 champions in the 2005/2006 season, with players such as Gregory van der Wiel and Jan Verthongron.

Dirk de Groot joined the Ajax membership council in 2010.
