= Chad Degroot =

American BMX rider (born 1974)

Personal information
- Nationality: American
- Born: March 23, 1974; Green Bay
- Occupation: BMX athlete

Sport
- Sport: Freestyle BMX, Dirt jumping
- Event: X Games

Chad Degroot (born March 23, 1974) is a freestyle BMX rider from Green Bay, Wisconsin. He's widely regarded as an influential rider because of his trick innovations that contributed to the development of flatland BMX.

== Career ==
Degroot started competing as a professional flatland rider in 1993. From 1990 to 2004, Chad and a few other riders from Wisconsin created and distributed 10 independent freestyle BMX videos known as the Baco series, which showcased Chad's inventive flatland combinations. Chad won the NORA Cup, the Number One Rider's Award, in 2002, 2003, and 2004. He has been sponsored by Standard, Schwinn, Haro Bikes, and he currently owns and operates his bike company, Deco. PowerBar started sponsoring Chad in 2010.

== Pro Flatland Contest History ==
1993
2nd BS Round 2
3rd BS Round 3
2nd BS Finals
1st KOC UK
1994
2nd BS Round 2
1995
3rd BS Round 1
3rd BS Round 3
1997
3rd BS Round 1
6th X Games
1998
1st BS Round 1
2nd BS Round 2
5th BS Round 2
7th X Games
1999
8th BS Round 1
10th BS Round 2
20th X Games
2000
2nd CFB Round 1
2001
8th BS Round 1
13th BS Round 2
6th X Games
2002
4th CFB Round 1
8th CFB Round 3
4th Backyard Jam UK
5th EXPN Round 2
