= Groot (surname) =

Groot (Legrand in French) is a Dutch surname. Groot (pronounced [ɣroːt]) means "big" in Dutch and was originally the name for a tall person. The name is most common in the province of North Holland. It may refer to:

- Ana María Groot (born 1952), Colombian historian, archaeologist, and anthropologist
- Anna Maria Groot (born 1952), Dutch model, Miss Europe of 1973
- Cees Groot (1932–1988), Dutch footballer, brother of Henk
- Chantal Groot (born 1982), Dutch swimmer
- Cor Groot (1899–1978), Dutch Olympic sailor
- Cornelia Groot (born 1988), Dutch team handball player
- Denise Groot (born 1990), Dutch pole vaulter
- Ed Groot (born 1957), Dutch journalist and politician
- Gerard Groot (1340–1384), Dutch Roman Catholic deacon, founder of the Brethren of the Common Life
- Henk Groot (1938–2022), Dutch footballer, brother of Cees
- Jacob Groot (1812–1893), Russian philologist
- Marike Groot (born 1968), Dutch singer
- Nycke Groot (born 1988), Dutch handball player
- Roger Groot (1942–2005), American law professor
- Simon Groot (1934–2025), Dutch agronomist
- Tjade Groot (born 1973), Dutch cricketer

== See also ==
- De Groot
