= Guillaume de Groot =

Belgian sculptor

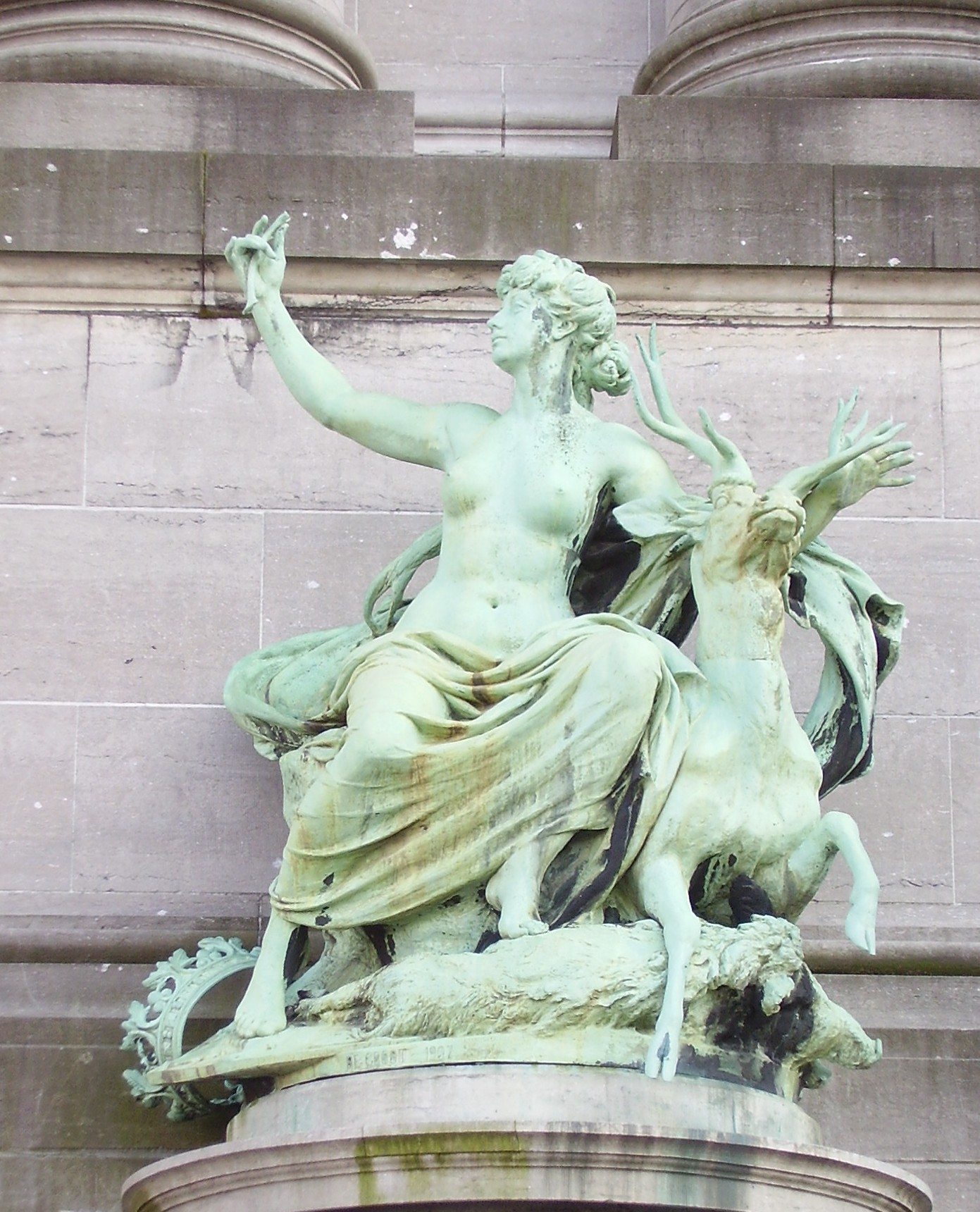
Province of Luxembourg at the Parc du Cinquantenaire/Jubelpark, Brussels

Guillaume de Groot (1839–1922) was a Belgian sculptor. Born in Brussels, he trained with sculptor Égide Mélot.

== Work ==
- Bronze figures of Namur and Luxembourg, on the triumphal arch at the Parc du Cinquantenaire/Jubelpark, Brussels
- Four reclining figures on the window pediments at the Bourse Palace, Brussels, for architect Léon Suys, c. 1870
- Figure of Music, one of four figures on the piers of the facade, as well as the gilded Genius of Art, atop the Royal Museums of Fine Arts of Belgium, Brussels, for architect Alphonse Balat, c. 1875
- Heroic figure of Labour for Tournai railway station, 1881
- Bronze statue of Charles Rogier, Place de la Liberté/Vrijheidsplein, Brussels, 1897
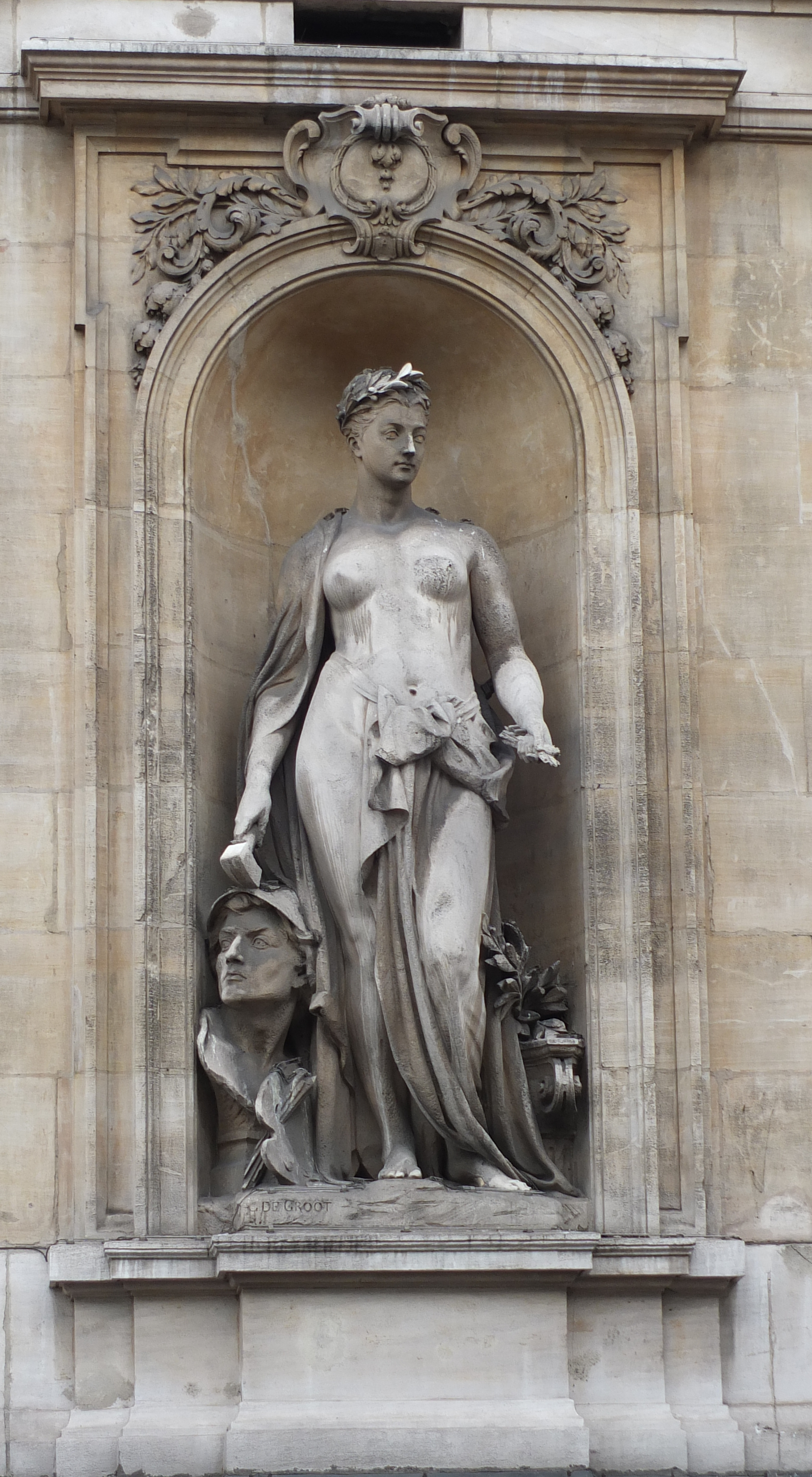
Les arts ("Art")

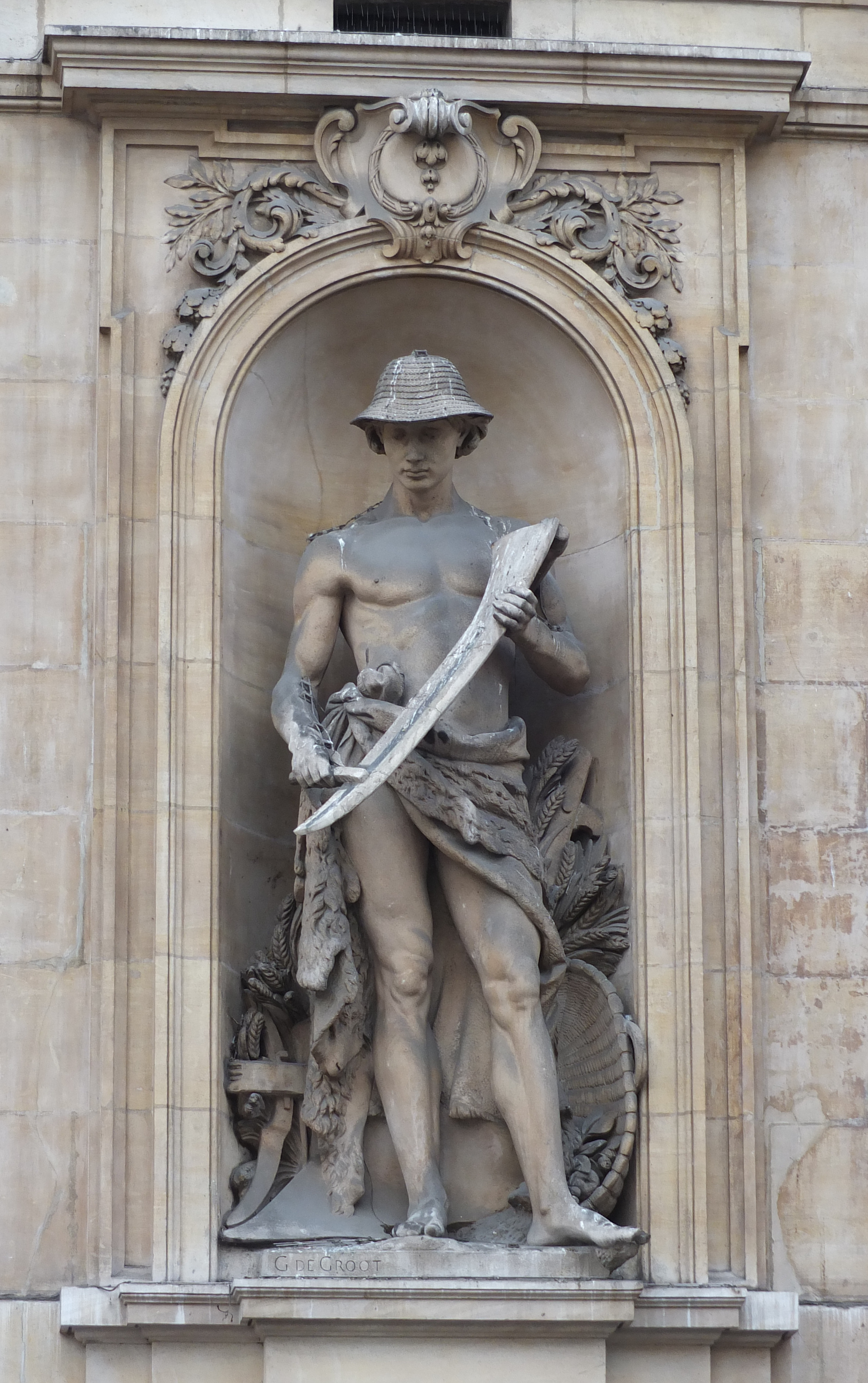
L'agriculture ("Agriculture")

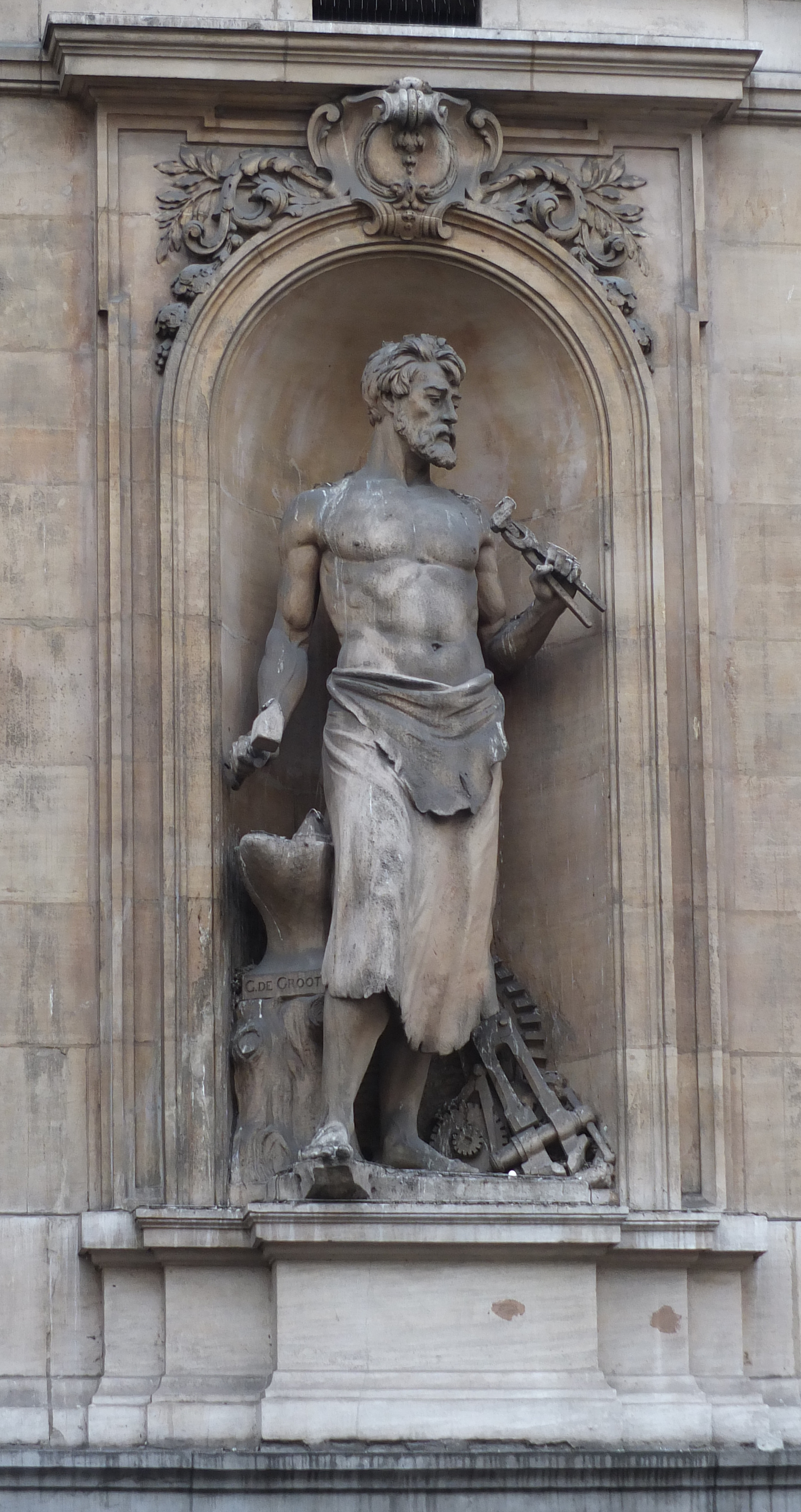
L'industrie ("Industry")

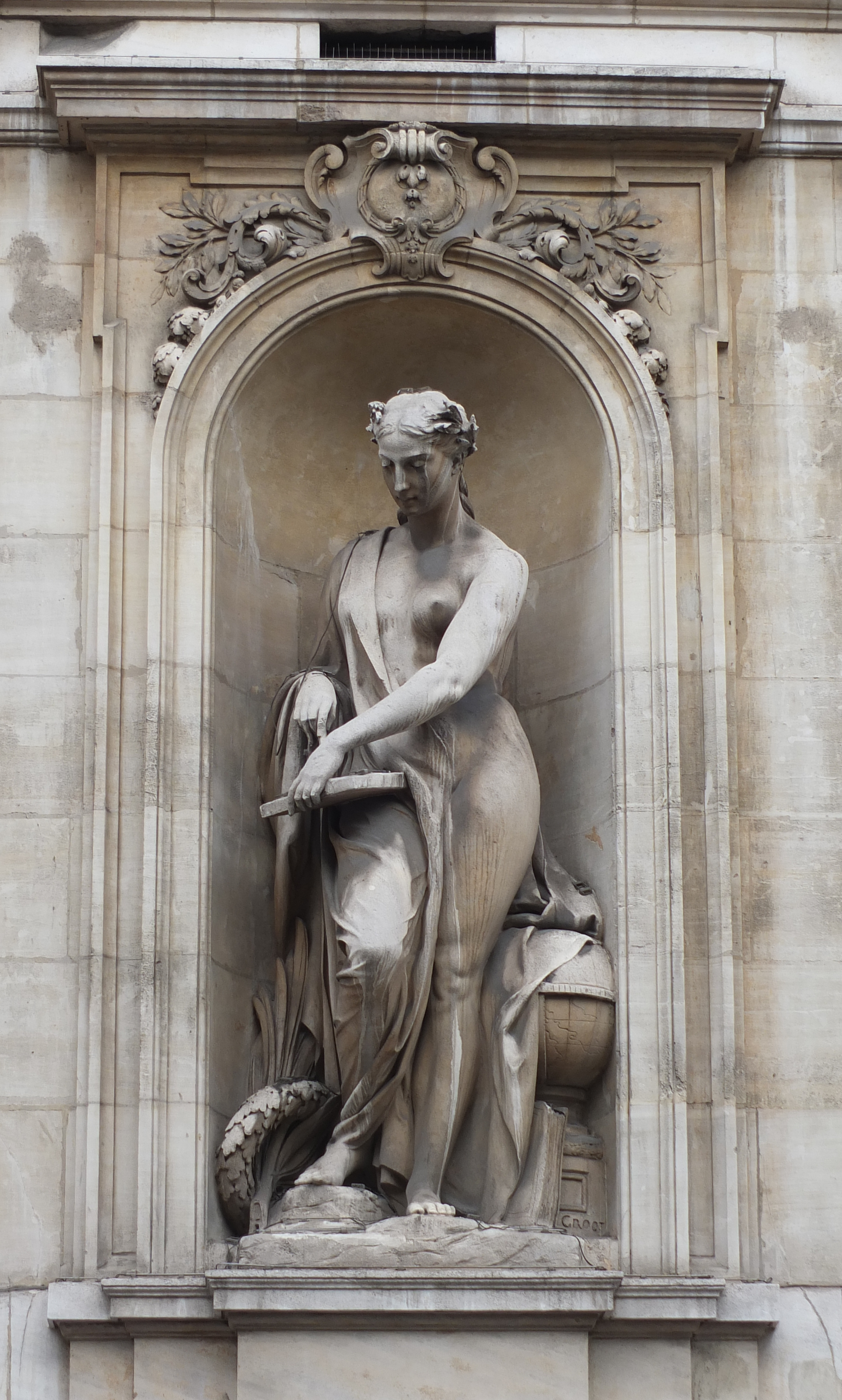
La science ("Science")
