= De Groote =

De Groote is a Dutch surname meaning "the big one". It is most common in Flanders and sometimes is concatenated as DeGroote or Degroote. People with this name include:

- Jan de Groote (1911–1989), Dutch farmer and politician
- Koenraad Degroote (born 1959), Belgian politician
- Melvin De Groote (1895–1963), American chemist and inventor with 925 patents
- Michael DeGroote (1933–2022), Canadian businessman and philanthropist
- Michel De Groote (born 1955), Belgian football defender
- Patrick De Groote (born 1958), Belgian politician
- fr:Paul De Groote (1905–1997), Belgian government minister
- Steven De Groote (1953–1989), South African classical pianist
- Thierry De Groote (born 1975), Belgian road bicycle racer
- Wouter Degroote (born 1978), Belgian footballer

== See also ==
- De Groote Peel National Park, National Park in the Peel, a region in the Southeast of the Netherlands
- DeGroote School of Business, faculty at McMaster University in Hamilton, Ontario, Canada
- Michael G. DeGroote School of Medicine, medical school of McMaster University in Hamilton, Ontario, Canada
