= Tony Grimaldi (businessman) =

Swedish businessman

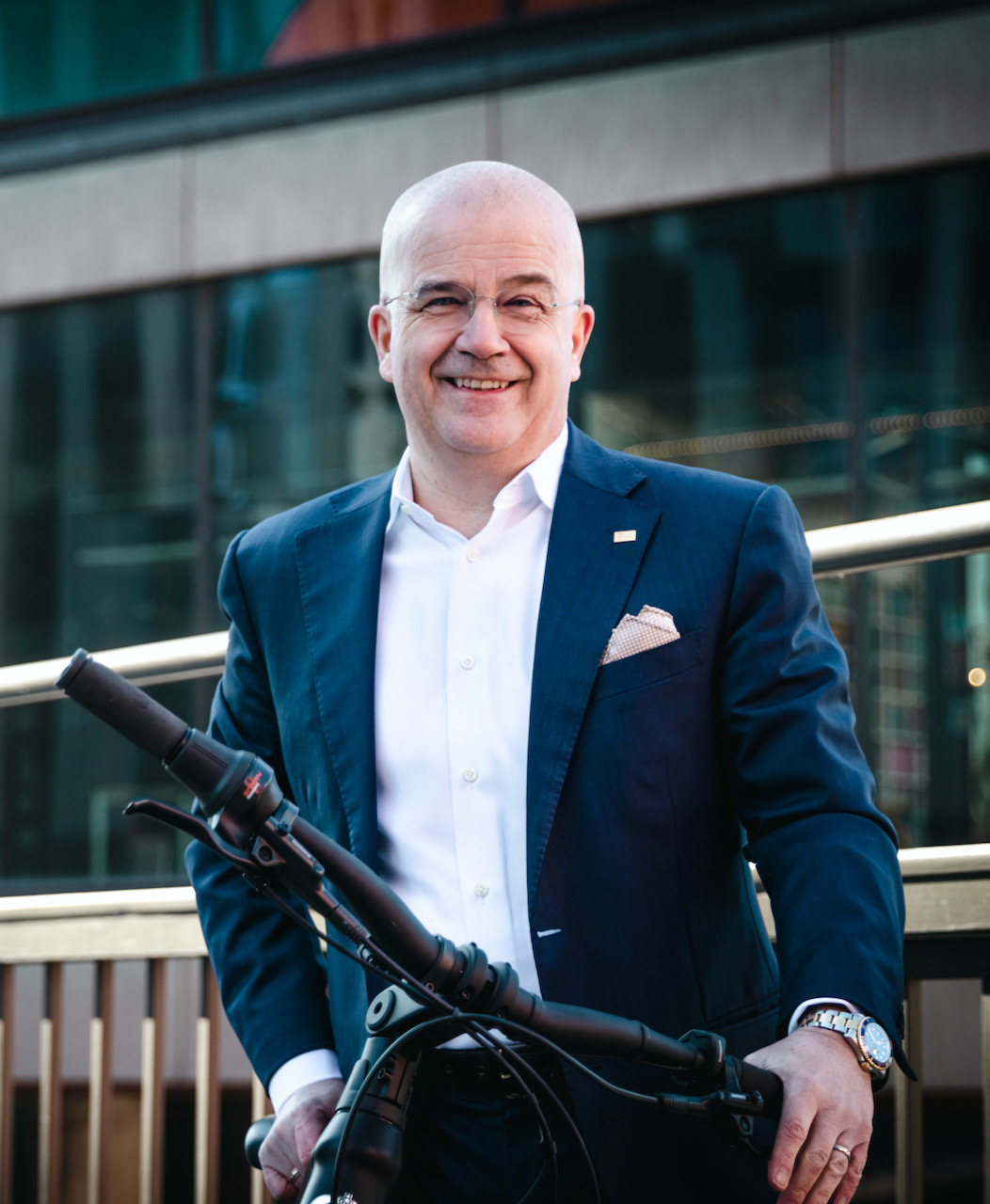
Tony Grimaldi

Tony Grimaldi (born 27 February 1966) in Köping, Sweden, is a Swedish engineer, business executive, and President and CEO of Cycleurope. Since 2018, Grimaldi has served as the Chairman of the Board of European Cycling Industries (ECI), headquartered in Brussels, Belgium.

== Biography ==
Tony Grimaldi received his Diploma in Science in Mechanical Engineering from KTH Royal Institute of Technology in 1990 and continued his studies at the Stockholm School of Economics, from which he graduated in 1996 with a Master of Business Administration.

Grimaldi began his CEO career at A.G. Johansons Metallfabrik in 1994. In 1996, he began his career within the Grimaldi Industri group, working initially as Operations Manager for several engineering companies. The following year, he became CEO and chairman of F.I.V.E. Bianchi S.p.A, Italy, where he worked until 2010. Under Grimaldi’s leadership, the Mercatone Uno–Bianchi cycling team was formed, winning the 1998 Giro d’Italia and the 1998 Tour de France with Italian rider Marco Pantani. That same year, Grimaldi and Bianchi introduced one of the first electrically assisted bicycles in Europe, in collaboration with Yamaha Motor Company. Grimaldi was also the initiator of Team Bianchi, which was formed in 2003 with German cyclist Jan Ullrich on the team.

Between 2006 and 2011, Grimaldi served as CEO of Cycleurope France SA, France, where he began a collaboration with the French postal service La Poste, which was in the process of replacing its smaller fossil fuel-powered delivery vehicles with electrically assisted bicycles. The French business underwent extensive restructuring and launched a line of electric bikes under the French brand Gitane.

Since 2010, Grimaldi has been President and CEO of Cycleurope, which is part of Grimaldi Industri AB. As CEO of Cycleurope, Grimaldi, together with En Svensk Klassiker, was involved in launching Skolklassikern in 2015. Since its inception, Skolklassikern has put over 200,000 children and adolescents in motion by promoting health projects.

In 2013, Grimaldi joined the Cycling Industry Club’s Advisory Board network to support the work of the European Cyclists’ Federation. Together with Kevin Mayne, the CEO of Cycling Industries Europe, Grimaldi developed the network, thus becoming Founding President, into Cycling Industries Europe in 2018, a trade association for companies working in the cycling sector working towards a modal shift to active mobility and cycling in line with European Union’s commitment to become the first climate neutral continent by 2050. CIE was a contributing party in enabling the European Cycling Declaration, an EU initiative with the goal of doubling cycling in Europe. The declaration was ratified by EU transport ministers on 3 April 2024. In 2025, a merger of CIE with CONEBI (The Confederation of the European Bicycle Industry) into ECI (European Cycling Industry) was carried out, in order to unite all European cycling organisations under the same umbrella. In connection with the merger, Tony Grimaldi was also elected as chairman of ECI. Furthermore, Tony Grimaldi currently serves as Board member of the World Federation of the Sporting Goods Industry (WFSGI), a non-profit organisation who represents the interest of the sporting goods industry while also being the sole world authoritative body for the sports industry, officially recognized by the International Olympic Committee.

Throughout his career, Tony Grimaldi’s core interest has been to improve public health in Europe through increased active mobility, something he described as the e-bike effect.

Grimaldi has been recognised for his efforts to create new Swedish jobs and green jobs by moving Cycleurope’s bicycle production from foreign markets to Cycleurope’s factories in Varberg, Sweden and Vansbro, Sweden.

== Board assignments ==
- World Federation of the Sporting Goods Industry (WFSGI) (Board member)
- European Cycling Industries (ECI), Brussels, Belgium (Founding President)
- SaltX Technology Holding AB (Board member 2018-2024)
- Advisory Board of European Cyclists Federation (CIC) (Chairman of the Board, 2014-2018)
- Grimaldi Industri AB (Board member)
- Swedish School of Sport and Health Sciences (Board member 2013-2022)

== Personal life ==
Grimaldi is the son of Salvatore Grimaldi, a Swedish entrepreneur and CEO of Grimaldi Industri AB.
