= Den Beste Sykkel =

Norwegian bicycle brand

- Founded: 1892
- Founder: Jonas Øglænd
- Headquarters: Sandnes, Norway
- Parent: Cycleurope
- Website: www.dbs.no

Den Beste Sykkel (lit. The Best Bike), better known as DBS, is a Norwegian bicycle brand, manufactured by Jonas Øglænd AS in Sandnes, Norway.

== History ==
The company was founded at Sandnes by Jonas Øglænd (1847–1931) in 1892 and operated under the brand name of Øglænd Cyklelager. At first it was an agent for the German manufacturer Hengstberg, later also the American brand The World. The bicycles were assembled in Norway. In addition to this, some bicycles were also assembled under the brands of Fram and Viking. Then, in 1906, the company started producing bicycles in its own factory.

The current brand name, which means "the best bicycle", was adopted in 1932 on the suggestion of the 12-year-old boy Knut Johansen in a competition. The next years were marked by expansion, and export started in 1949.

In recent years the company has suffered from competition with inexpensive bicycles from China and the Far East.

DBS was sold to Monark in 1989 and after several mergers, in 1996 became part of Swedish-based Cycleurope AB, the company behind brands such as Monark, Crescent, Peugeot, Cyclepro and Bianchi.
