= Marianne Bernadotte =

Member of the Swedish Royal Family (1924–2025)

- Princess Bernadotte, Countess of Wisborg
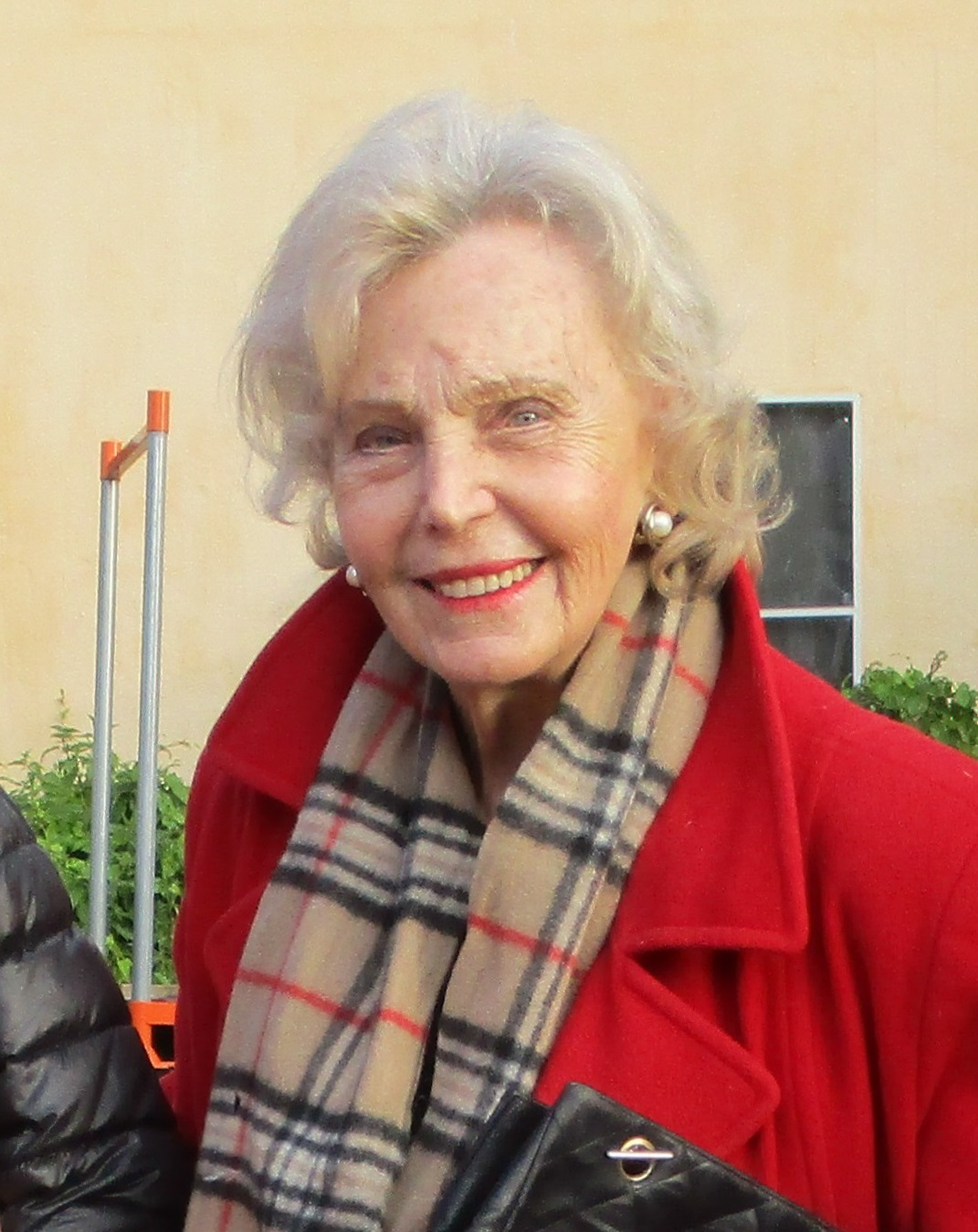
- Bernadotte in 2019
- Born: Gullan Marianne Lindberg; 15 July 1924; Helsingborg, Sweden
- Died: 16 May 2025 (aged 100); Stockholm, Sweden
- Spouses: Gabriel Tchang (m. 1947; div. 1957) Sigvard Bernadotte (m. 1961; died 2002)
- Issue: Robert Tchang; Richard Tchang; Marielle Tchang-Lagergren
- Father: Helge Lindberg
- Mother: Thyra Dahlman

Gullan Marianne, Princess Bernadotte, Countess of Wisborg (née Lindberg, later Tchang; 15 July 1924 – 16 May 2025), also known as Princess Marianne Bernadotte, was a Swedish actress, fashion icon, and philanthropist who in 1961 married Sigvard Bernadotte, the second son of Gustaf VI Adolf of Sweden and was officially included in the Swedish royal family.

Bernadotte was noted for her work supporting causes such as dyslexia, physical disabilities, and children's eye care and as a patron of the arts. She was awarded two honorary doctorates.

== Education and professional life ==
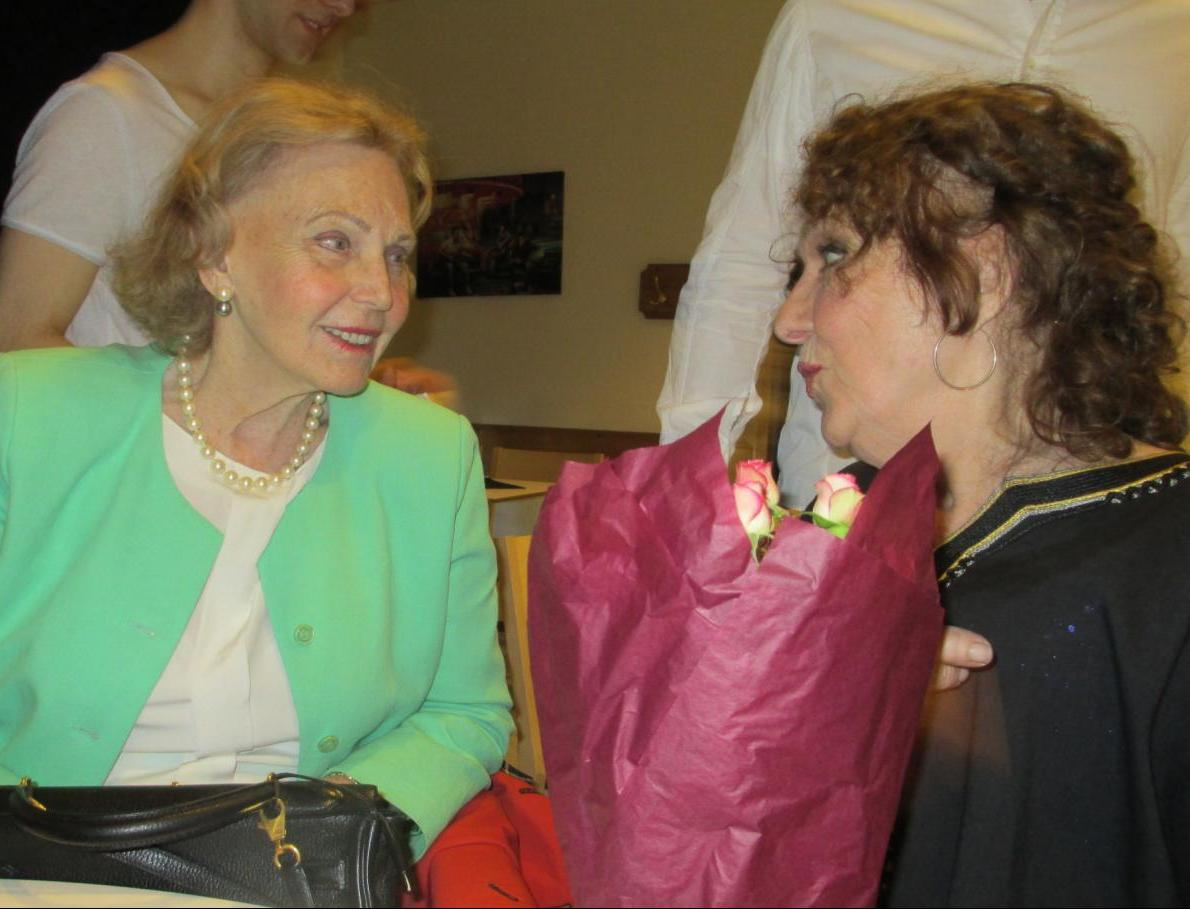
Bernadotte meets up in 2015 with her old colleague Gunvor Pontén from Stockholm's Royal Dramatic Theatre

Having performed in her teens at a noted open-air theatre (Fredriksdalsteatern) in her hometown, Bernadotte tried out for and was accepted by the Royal Dramatic Theatre's acting school the Royal Dramatic Training Academy and did their full drama course 1945-1948. Between semesters, she worked as a bus hostess on tours to Germany and France. After finishing her education, she was employed as actress Marianne Lindberg at the Royal Dramatic Theatre in Stockholm for eleven years, preferring challenging parts over glamorous ones. For her first of 25 parts on that stage, selected to act there as their only graduate that year, she played Annie in the Swedish version of Life With Father. Her directors included Olof Molander, Alf Sjöberg, Ingmar Bergman, Mimi Pollak, and Göran Gentele, and some of the actors in her plays were Jarl Kulle, Inga Tidblad, and Mai Zetterling. She also was in the motion picture Kulla Gulla in 1956 with Hugo Björne and appeared in two plays on Swedish television in 1957 and 1959. In her 1986 memoir, she described her acting experience, writing for example:

Along with your director and your fellow actors you find your way through to your part. You build up your own little world, a concentrate, where everyone invests of h-self to hold the pieces together and thus be able to offer the audience something whole.

The theatre was closed for renovation in 1956, and after leaving there Bernadotte was trained by the NK department store and took over their gift shop. A few years later, she took courses in Cultural Communication, French, and Art at Stockholm University, became the Swedish representative of Sotheby's and in 1970 studied gourmet cooking at Le Cordon Bleu in Paris. After her husband's reconciliation with her widowed father-in-law King Gustaf VI Adolf in the 1970s, she and the elderly Swedish king especially enjoyed cooking together.

In 1983, Marianne Bernadotte graduated as Bachelor of Arts in Art history at Stockholm University. Her academic papers included work on the glass artist and sculptor Edvin Öhrström.

In July 2014, she received good reviews after hosting the popular radio show Sommar on her 90th birthday.

== High fashion ==
With her new husband Sigvard, Bernadotte met Pierre Balmain in Paris in 1962. She became particularly close and lifelong friends with Balmain and with his successor Erik Mortensen, and they as well as several other French houses of haute couture often for publicity dressed the easily fitted Bernadotte in their latest work.

In 1985, Marianne Bernadotte was named one of the 10 best dressed women in the world, by the Chambre Syndicale de la Haute Couture in Paris alongside Gina Lollobrigida, Princess Ira von Fürstenberg, and Princess Gersende d'Orléans.

Bernadotte's taste in clothing is still appreciated and hailed by several of Sweden's top designers such as Pär Engsheden and Christer Lindarw. In 2017, Millesgården in Stockholm had a four-month exhibition called CHANEL BALMAIN DIOR MARIANNE BERNADOTTE - En stilikon with a large number of the most valuable and unique items in Bernadotte's high fashion wardrobe from the 1960s and on, mixed in with the museum's ancient nude and clothed statuary. The exhibition was opened by Bernadotte's grandniece Crown Princess Victoria who twenty years earlier also with Bernadotte had opened an exhibition on the late Sigvard Bernadotte's design at the National Museum of Fine Arts.

== Philanthropy ==
Adhering to the concept of Noblesse oblige, from the 1960s onwards, Bernadotte was deeply involved with concerns in the areas of physical handicaps, health, research and the arts.

One of her first involvements was publicity and funding work for the Swedish Permobil electric wheelchair designed by Per Uddén, who has credited her efforts in making it a field leader and "creating liberty for hundreds of thousands of people with mobility problems all over the world".

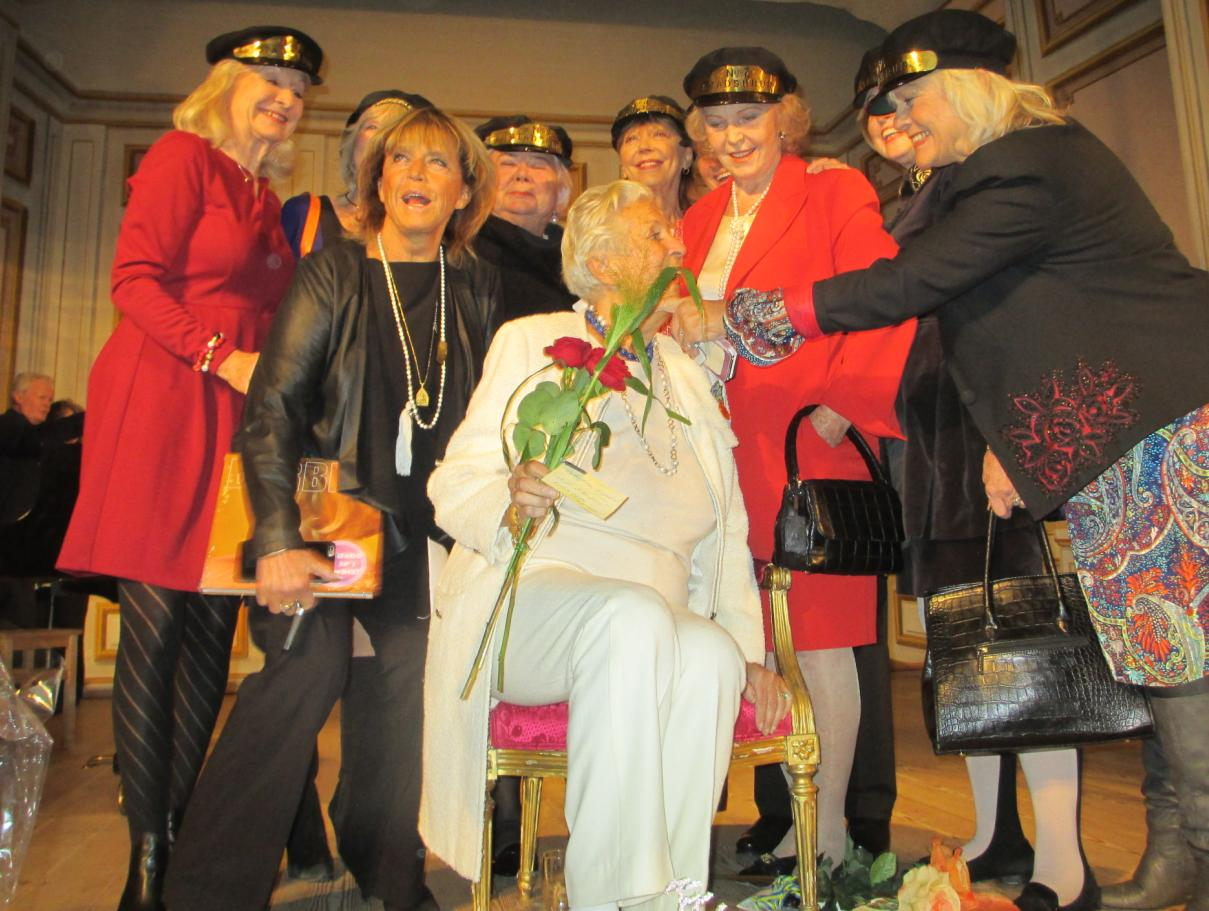
Bernadotte honors fellow Stadsbrudskåren member Kjerstin Dellert on her 90th birthday, along with other members Alexandra Charles, Lill-Babs, Lill Lindfors and Christina Schollin

In the 1980s, Bernadotte joined several professors in launching an academy to coordinate international dyslexia research and support young researchers. In 1982, for her husband's 75th birthday, he asked for no gifts other than financial contributions to the recently founded Marianne & Sigvard Bernadotte Arts Fund which awards annual scholarships to young students of music, theatre, design and art, enabling young artists to develop their talents early in their careers. Such honorees who have succeeded well include actors Rikard Wolff, Björn Kjellman, and Melinda Kinnaman, and designers Behnaz Aram and Sandra Backlund. Bernadotte personally introduced these talents every year at a well-attended Stockholm ceremony on 7 June, Sigvard's birthday, and handed over their scholarships.

In 1988, Professor Gunnar Lennerstrand wanted to start a Stockholm center for children's eye care. Bernadotte began fundraising efforts, procured valuable artwork from artist friends and was assisted by other prominent members of Stadsbrudskåren (Urban Women's Corps, which she belonged to since it was founded in 1965) for an auction at Bukowskis in 1990 which brought in SEK 1.2 million. Just before that she and Sigvard Bernadotte had founded the Sigvard & Marianne Bernadotte Research Foundation for Children’s Eye Care which gives grants to researchers and has led to documentation and treatment of eye problems in the prematurely born. Since 1992, over 20 million SEK have been awarded by the foundation and a prize in Bernadotte's name has also been given for clinical research. She also founded The International Research Foundation for Children’s Eye Care Inc. and The Marianne Bernadotte Scholarship Fund for Prominent Dyslexia Research and Education, and through these and other civic commitments actively supports public and voluntary service. The over 300 members of the Friendship Association of the Prince Sigvard Bernadotte and Princess Marianne Bernadotte Couple include top Swedish business people who also contribute considerably to these charities. In 1998, she was awarded an Honorary Doctorate of Medicine by that institute, and Marianne Bernadotte Center, founded in 2013, is slated to move into new facilities there from its current location at St. Eriks Hospital in Stockholm.

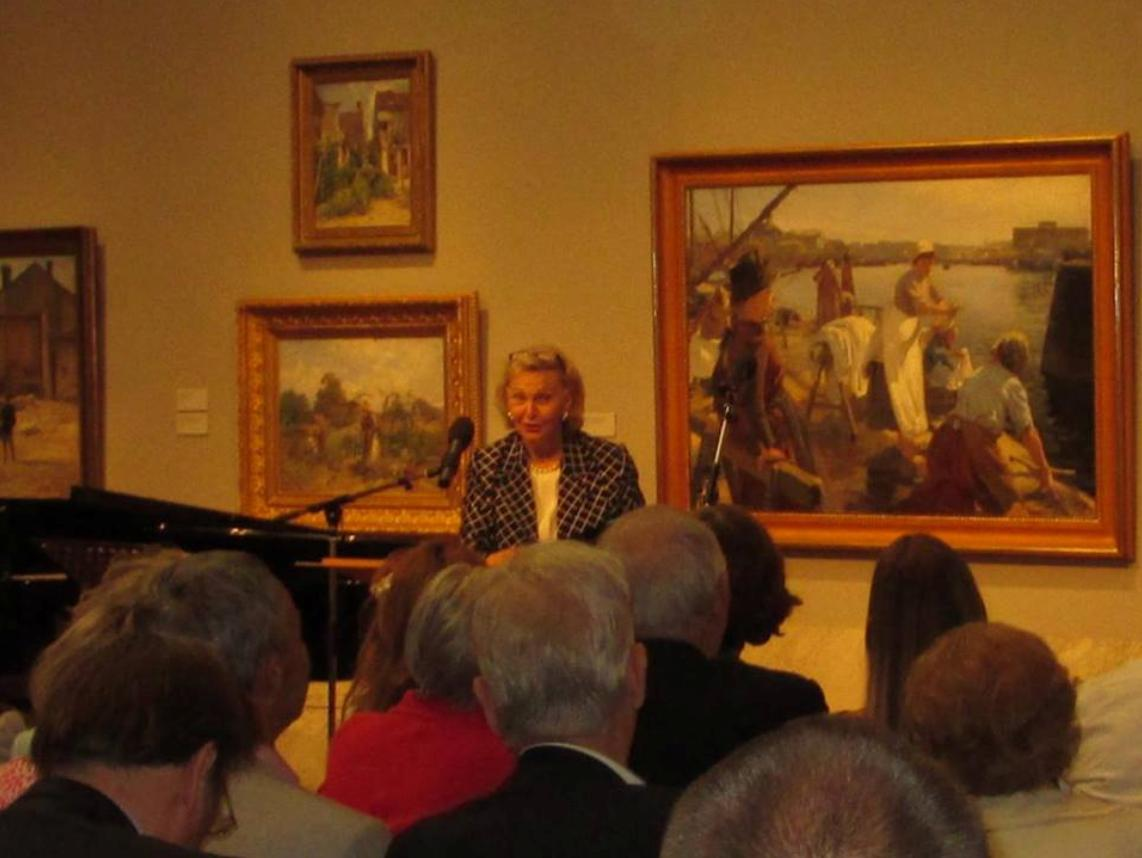
Princess Marianne Bernadotte awards her art scholarships at Waldemarsudde in 2016

Since Sigvard's death in 2002, the charities depended fully on Marianne Bernadotte's continuous commitment to them and her "forcefulness, imagination, initiative, endurance and charm" (Werkelid pp. 10–11).

As of 2006, she had an Honorary Doctorate from the University of Bologna's Institute of Psychology in recognition of her contributions to dyslexia research. She was also Honorary Chairman of The Swedish Dyslexia Foundation and Swedish Dyslexia Association and Honorary President of The International Rodin Remediation Academy (Stilikon ... p. 141).

The 20th anniversary award ceremony in 2012 was attended by their grandnephew Prince Carl Philip, Duke of Värmland, as well as Queen Noor of Jordan and former empress Farah of Iran.

Bernadotte took a similar initiative in establishing The Bernadotte Foundation for Children's Eyecare in New York, for which she personally recorded a video presentation in English as Princess Marianne Bernadotte in 2014 (using her late husband's title as more and more frequent internationally). That began with another charity auction, this time at Sotheby's, and fundraising banquets in several U.S. locations. At Karolinska Institutet in Stockholm, she created the Sigvard and Marianne Bernadotte Research Laboratories for Pediatric Ophthalmology. At age 92, she decided that the 2017 event instead should take place at Uppsala Castle, on the 110th anniversary of Sigvard's birth as a prince of Sweden and Duke of Upland (Bjers p. 31).

== Family and marriages ==
Bernadotte was born and grew up in Helsingborg, Sweden, the daughter of Helge Lindberg and his wife Thyra Dahlman. Her parents were divorced when she was a girl and she then lost touch with her father for many years, which she described as grievous, while also greatly admiring her strong mother for taking charge of her and her brother.

Her brother Rune suffered from dyslexia before it was an understood problem, and that plus her discovery much later, that members of the Swedish royal family also struggled with the affliction, led to her keen interest in the subject. The death of her second child as a baby, who went blind before expiring of vaccination complications, heightened her interest in children's eyesight and related problems involved in many dyslexia cases.

1892 Arms designed and recognized in Sweden for Counts and Countesses of Wisborg

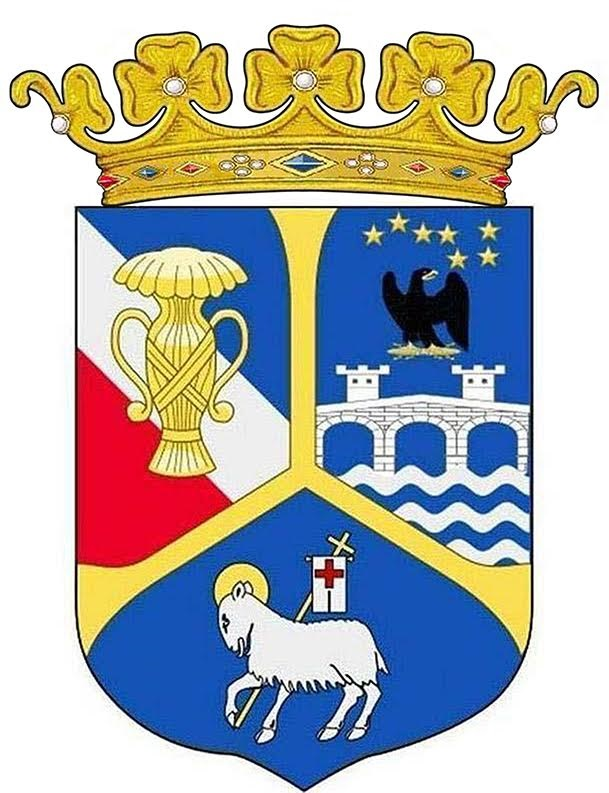
1951 Arms as per Luxembourg Government for Princes and Princesses Bernadotte

Her first marriage in 1947, while an actress employed at Dramaten, was to Gabriel "Toto" Tchang (1919–1980), the son of a former Chinese ambassador to Sweden Tchang Tsou Seng, from whom she was divorced in 1957. They had three children:

- Robert Gabriel Tchang (1948–2012)
- Richard Antoine Tchang (1950–1952)
- Marie Gabrielle "Marielle" Tchang Lagergren (born 1953)

She married, secondly, on 30 July 1961 in Stockholm, the former Swedish prince Sigvard Bernadotte (second son of King Gustaf VI Adolf and his first wife Princess Margaret of Connaught), whom she had met much earlier when he was designing scenography at Dramaten, and again in 1957 when seeing mutual friends in Båstad. On 2 July 1951, Sigvard (styled personally for himself and his wife as Prince and Princess Bernadotte), had been admitted into the nobility of Luxembourg and given the hereditary title Count of Wisborg for himself, his wife and his marital descendants, by Grand Duchess Charlotte.

Following the death of her sister-in-law Gunnila Bernadotte in 2016, Marianne Bernadotte became the last surviving aunt of King Carl XVI Gustaf of Sweden, Queen Margrethe II of Denmark, and Queen Anne-Marie of Greece. On 23 January 2022, she surpassed her late sister-in-law Princess Lilian, Duchess of Halland, as the longest-living member on record of the royal family and on 15 July 2024 she became the first official member of the royal family to turn 100 years old. She was also the last bearer of the personal Princess Bernadotte title.

She had a much younger half-sister, Ylva Lindberg, who married Indian-born Swedish hotelier Bicky Chakraborty, one of the richest men in Scandinavia.

She had several grandchildren and great-grandchildren.

== Death ==
Marianne Bernadotte died at a retirement home in Stockholm, on 16 May 2025, at the age of 100. Her grave is with that of Sigvard Bernadotte at the Royal Cemetery in Solna.

== Honours ==
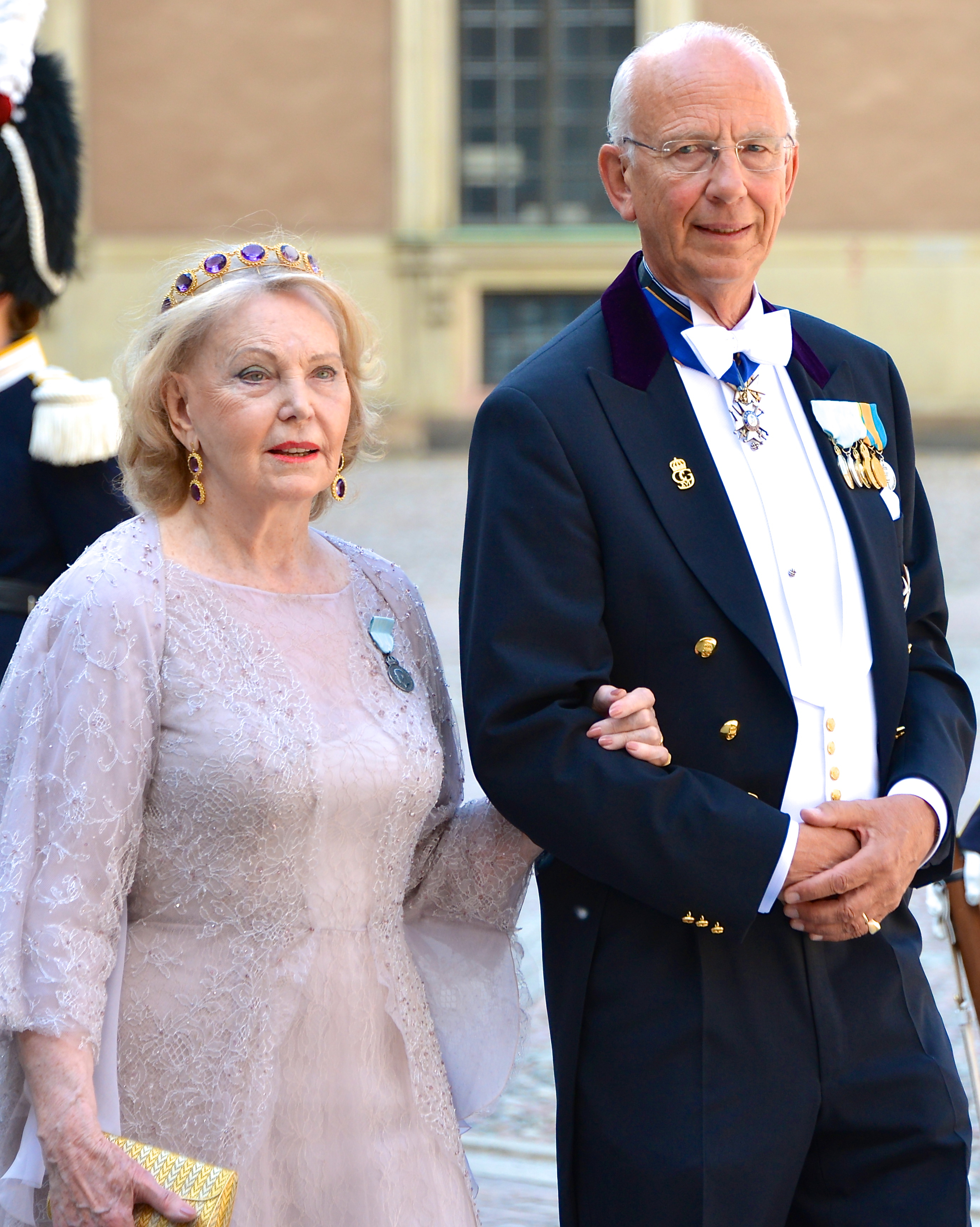
Bernadotte escorted to the 2013 wedding of her grandniece Madeleine of Sweden

- Sweden: Recipient of the 85th Birthday Medal of King Gustav VI Adolf
- Sweden: Recipient of the 50th Birthday Badge Medal of King Carl XVI Gustaf
- Sweden: Recipient of the Wedding Medal of Crown Princess Victoria to Daniel Westling
- Sweden: Recipient of the Ruby Jubilee Badge Medal of King Carl XVI Gustaf
- Sweden: Recipient of the 70th Birthday Badge Medal of King Carl XVI Gustaf
- Sweden: From 2018, she served as award presenter at the annual Stockholm Culture Awards ceremony at Riddarhuset in Stockholm.

== Comprehensive sources ==
- Stilikon & filantrop / Style Icon & Philanthropist Marianne Bernadotte by Carl Otto Werkelid, Tina Magnergård Bjers, Onita Wass & Cay Bond, Arvinius+Orfeus, Stockholm 2017 ISBN 978-91-87543-83-8 (Swedish & English)
- Sommar 15 July 2014, Sveriges Radio Stockholm, an hour's worth of autobiographical recollections by Marianne Bernadotte (Swedish)
- Glimtar och scener by Marianne Bernadotte, Norstedts, Stockholm 1986 ISBN 91-1-863442-7 (Swedish)
