= Øglænd =

Øglænd is a Norwegian surname. Notable people with the surname include:

- Finn Øglænd (born 1957), Norwegian author, poet, translator, and literature critic
- Jonas Øglænd (1847–1931), Norwegian merchant and industrial entrepreneur
