= Bianchi 8 HP =

1903 car produced by F.I.V. Edoardo Bianchi

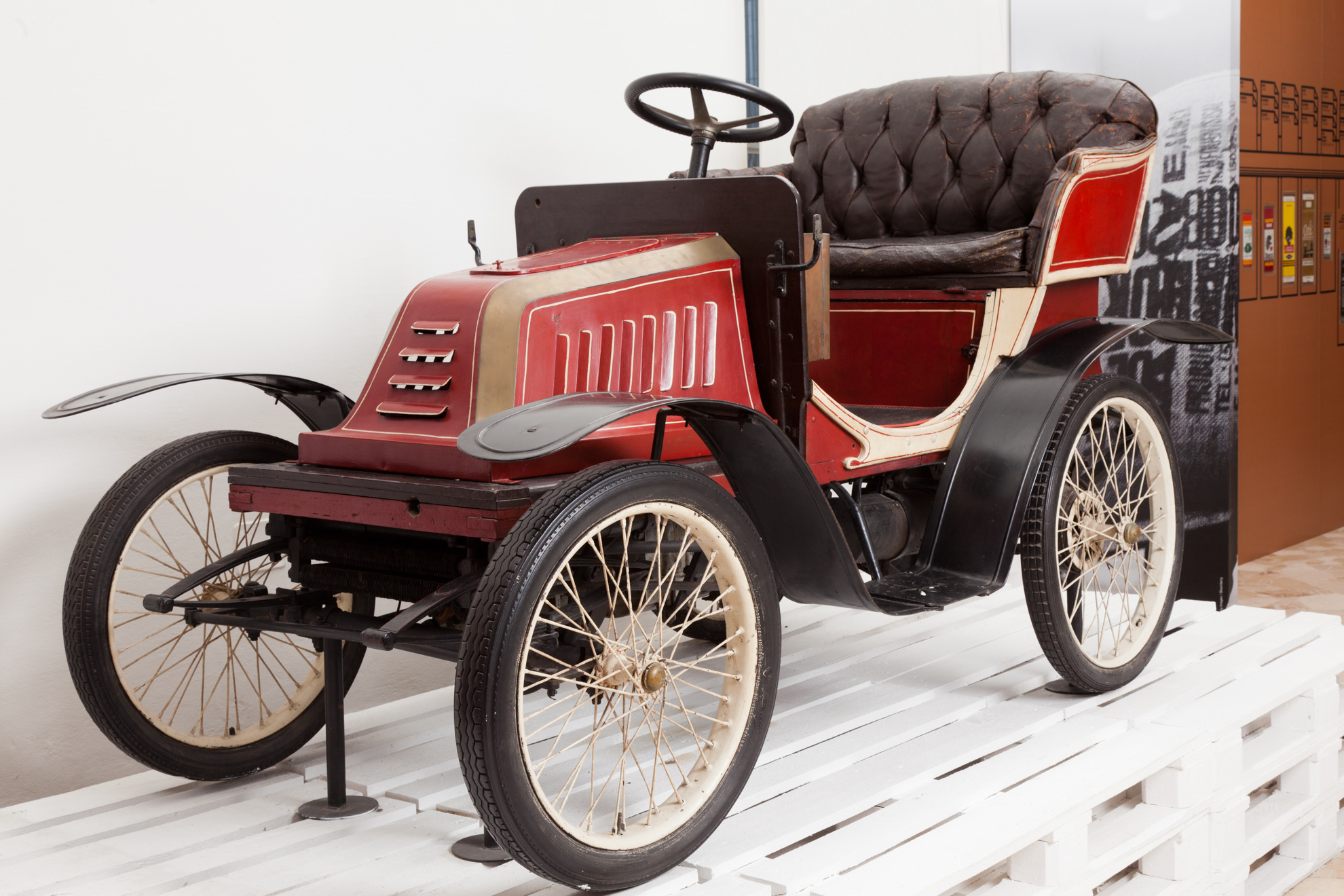
Vetturetta Bianchi 8 HP. Historical car preserved at the Museo nazionale della scienza e della tecnologia Leonardo da Vinci, in Milan.

The Bianchi 8 HP is a car produced by F.I.V. Edoardo Bianchi in 1903.

== Characteristics ==
The car's body was made of precious woods, using aluminium foils on a sturdy frame consisting of a rectangular structure made of steel tubes, with a second tubular frame positioned inside the first. The technical solution of a double chassis made sure that, in case of impact, the deformations of the first would not be transmitted to the second, safeguarding the mechanical parts, engine and transmission.

Other technical characteristics:

Chassis: Double chassis made of steel tubes.

Engine: De Dion Buton, single cylinder 942 cm^{3}.

Ignition: Crank ignition, directly on engine.

Settings: The levers on the steering column regulate the flow of fuel, oil and air into the carburetor.

Transmission: Cardan shaft drive fitting the rear axle.

Brakes: Drum brake only on rear wheels.

Cooling system: Water-cooling system with vane-based heat exchanger in the front of the car.

Transmission: Two-speed and reverse gear. As in modern cars there is a clutch pedal and a gear box.

Suspension system: The semi-elliptic leaf springs act directly on the axles.

Colouring: red body with golden finishings and black fenders.

== History ==
In 1901, Edoardo Bianchi designed the 8 HP. Bianchi was the founder of the popular Milanese bicycle company F.I.V. Edoardo Bianchi. In 1903, when Bianchi turned to car-building, these were among the first cars in the world to travel the streets of cities, which until then were only populated by carriages, wagons, pedestrians and a few horse-drawn or steam trams. These cars were built with precious materials, for wealthy clients. At the beginning of the 1900s, one would cost around 10,000 Italian lire, corresponding to ten years of a doctor's salary. The price included two days of driving school for inexperienced drivers, a wrench, a roll of duct tape, and an air pump. The most skillful Italian coach builders, cabinet-makers and carvers were employed to customize these small motorised coaches, respecting the taste of the individual owners.

Bianchi offered six different models between 4,5 and 12 HP.
