= Nymanbolagen =

Swedish bicycle/motorcycle manufacturer

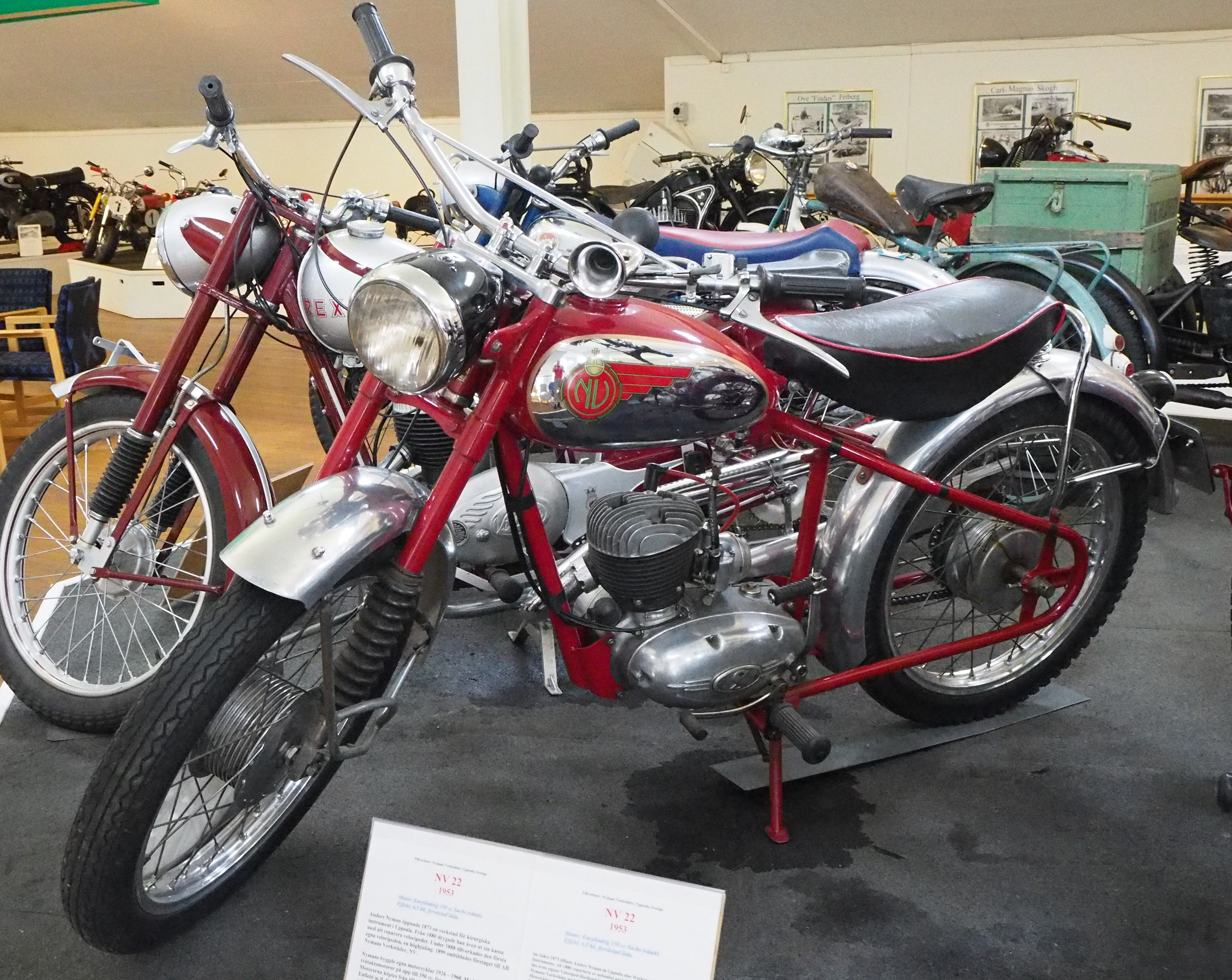
- Headquarters: Uppsala, Sweden

Nymanbolagen (aka Nymans AB or just Nymans) was a Swedish bicycle, moped, and motorcycle manufacturing company in Uppsala, Sweden.

In 1947 Nymans Verkstäder in Uppsala, Lindblads Verkstäder (Amerikansk Cycleimport) in Stockholm and some minor bicycle companies, formed Nymanbolagen AB, situated in Uppsala, Sweden.

Nymans also manufactured small two cycle outboard boat engines.

In 1961 Nymanbolagen merged with the bicycle company Monark AB in Varberg, Sweden into Monark-Crescentbolagen or MCB. Later all production took place in Varberg.

The factory in Varberg is now owned by Grimaldi Industri AB via its bicycle company Cycleurope, also producing Bianchi, Gitane, Puch and some other brands.

== Brands ==
- Lindblads/Nymanbolagen: Crescent, NV
- Monark/MCB: Monark, Crescent
