= Bicky Chakraborty =

Swedish hotelier (1943–2022)

Barun Chakraborty
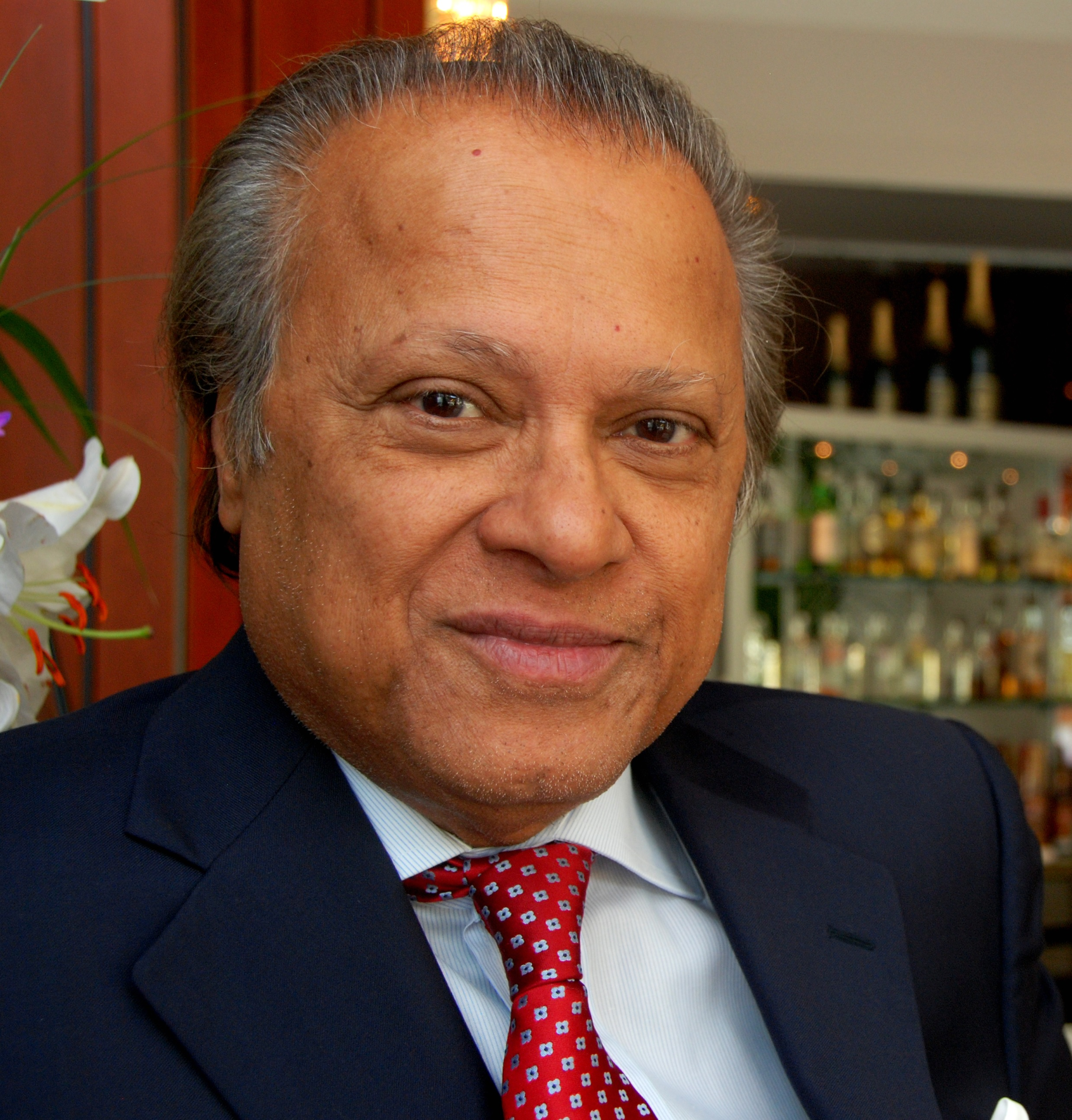
- Chakraborty in 2009
- Born: 28 August 1943; Calcutta, Bengal Presidency, British India
- Died: 26 August 2022 (aged 78)
- Education: Stockholm University
- Occupation: Hotelier
- Spouse: Ylva Lindberg
- Relatives: Countess Marianne Bernadotte af Wisborg (sister-in-law)
- Awards: H. M. The King's Medal; Royal Patriotic Society Business Medal; Pravasi Bharatiya Samman

Barun Kumar “Bicky” Chakraborty (28 August 1943 – 26 August 2022) was an Indian-born Swedish businessman. He was the president and founder of Elite Hotels of Sweden and The Bishop's Arms. He was counted as one of the richest men in Scandinavia.

== Biography ==
Chakraborty came to Sweden from Calcutta, India in 1966 to study Sociology at the Stockholm University. He saw that student dormitories were empty over the summer and began pushing the dorm Domus as a discount hotel to rent out those who were located near Stureplan in Stockholm. Chakraborty managed to acquire these properties from the student association in private hands and they became due plate in his hotel empire. Later he went on to buy the rundown city hotel (sv) and rehabilitate it. In 1980, he bought Hotel in London, a historic city hotel from 1858. At this time there were several run down city hotels around the country. Swedish hospitality was most focused on motels near urban areas. Chakraborty saw this opportunity to revive the ancient city hotel tradition, but in a more modern form. Bicky Chakraborty owned and operated the hotel chain Elite (sv), which covers several historically important city hotels in the country, including Hotel Knaust (sv) in Sundsvall, Hotel Mollberg (sv) in Helsingborg, Hotel Savoy (sv) in Malmö and the City Hotel in Västerås. The hotel business founded by Bicky Chakraborty is the only Swedish-owned hotel chain in Sweden.

== Awards and recognition ==
In 2008, Chakraborty was awarded the Royal Patriotic Society Business Medal, for having contributed to the development of Swedish industry, and was a recipient of H. M. The King's Medal in the 12th size. He was also the winner of the Pravasi Bharatiya Samman awarded by the Government of India. Chakraborty was also member of the Jönköping University Foundation.

== Personal life ==
Chakraborty married in 1973 Ylva Lindberg (b. 1949), then a student at the Stockholm School of Economics (Handelshögskolan i Stockholm) and the younger sister of Princess Marianne Bernadotte, who is 25 years her senior. They are the parents of a daughter, Caroline Chakraborty, and grandparents of three grandchildren.
