= Tempo (motorcycle manufacturer) =

Norwegian motorcycle and moped manufacturer

- Founded: 1931
- Defunct: 1994
- Headquarters: Sandnes, Norway
- Products: Motorcycles

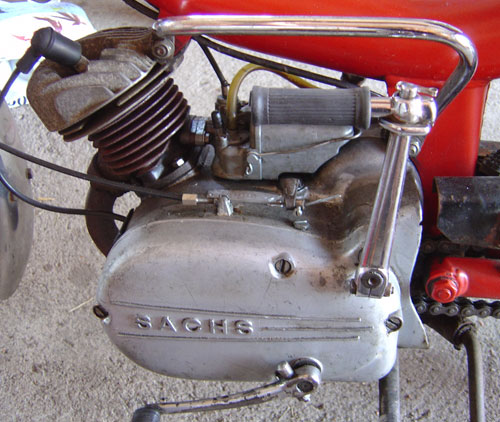
Sachs moped motor

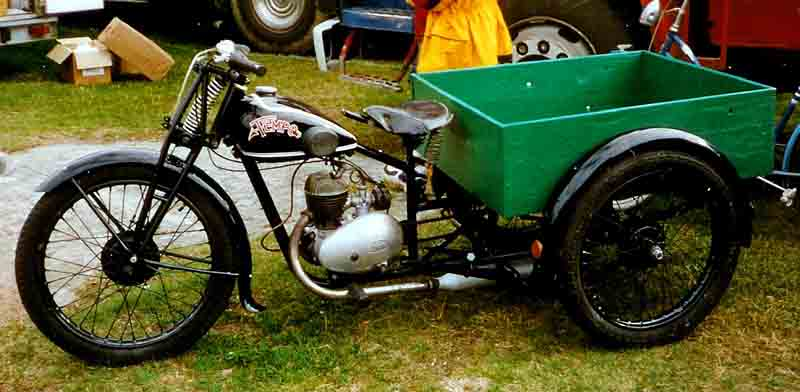
Tempo

Tempo was a Norwegian motorcycle and moped brand. Jonas Øglænd made the rolling chassis and most of the parts thereof, and Fichtel & Sachs AG made the engines for the majority of the models. After 1972 the company made mopeds only.

== The early years ==
In 1868 Jonas Øglænd started his business with mounting and selling bicycles. One of the brands was "The World", initially made in USA, starting licence production in Sandnes, Norway in 1906. In the early 30s the idea of putting an engine in the frame of one of these bicycles was born, and serial production of the motorized "The World" started in 1931 continuing to 1934. Øglænd also sold Ner-A-Car motorcycles in the 1920s. Engine kits for bicycles was also sold, but no complete motorcycle of in-house manufacture until 1931

== The first Tempo ==
The first motorcycle to carry the Tempo brand was the Sachs 98cc engined Standard, made from 1934 to 1939. In 1936 the models Sport and Luxus, and the 3 wheeled Transport joined the program, and in 1937 the Villiers, initially sporting a 98cc Villiers 9D engine.

== The first moped ==
The first Tempo moped ever manufactured was the bicycle-like 1951 Tempo Handy. It looked like a bicycle, but where the pedals normally would be it carried a Sachs 49 cc, 1 hp engine with pedals and two gears, shifted with the left side twist grip. It had a three-litre gasoline tank and weighed around 28 kilograms. To start the moped, one put the engine in neutral (the start gear) and used the pedals as a kick starter. To pedal the bike, e.g. in the event of running out of petrol, the clutch lever was kept depressed by means of a small locking device and the transmission put in first or second gear. The engine was stopped by pressing a small switch that grounded the magneto. This moped sold well and was very cheap, but eventually more luxuries were needed and from 1957 Tempo made the rear suspensioned Comfort and Swing (same construction, the latter utilizing a swingarm front fork hence the name.) mopeds using the same engine before introducing the Corvette in 1960. Upgraded versions of the Sachs hand-shifted pedal engine had 1,6 hp and 3 gears.

== Corvette era ==
The small and easy driven Corvette was a small underbone moped manufactured from 1960 until 1994 (from the early 1980s produced in Portugal). It had a 49-cubic-centimetre (3.0 cu in) Sachs engine, initially the same pedal engine as the earlier mopeds, later a foot-shifted 2.5 hp Sachs engine with three or four gears and fan cooling. A two-speed automatic version was designated Saxonette.

The combination of German engines and Norwegian frames was cheap and reliable, with few errors. Tempo-Lett mopeds were especially popular during the 1960s and the 1970s. Carrying a 5-litre gasoline tank, one filling of 4% petroil mix gives a considerable range. The engine is started by selecting neutral between first and 2. gear, then hitting the kickstarter. The Corvette was very reliable; one just tipped the gas dipper until the carb overflowed, a bit throttle and kick, and the Corvette would start.

The Tempo made mopeds were easy to acquire, as they were sold at grocery marts, bicycle and sports stores and some other places too. In rural places, a store or business could (and still can) have a broader range of goods and services than usually found in those of a city.

To circumvent regulations on produced units of one brand, CKD kits (on which there were no restrictions) were sold to dealers that put the bikes together and put their own brand on the tank. Some examples of such brands are Trygg, Svithun and Tambar-Sachs.

In Norway before 1987, a driver's licence for a moped was not required but the driver had to be 16 years old and "have the needed skills" to drive a moped. Later, youth between 16 and 20 years of age needed a moped pass. Since 2005 a drivers licence is mandatory but those being 20 years or older at the time the requirement was settled can obtain one without going through any formal training.

Although the Corvette sold well, its appeal was mostly its more practical sides rather than being a show off piece. Øglænd turned towards the younger and more sporty generation when they introduced the motorcycle like Tempo Panter in 1966. This moped was also a big success, initially with the same fan-cooled engine as the Corvette but eventually sporting an all new wind cooled Sachs 50 cc engine. The Corvette and Panter was the best known Tempo mopeds, but many other models were made over the years. Other examples of mopeds include, amongst others, the models Avanti, Victoria, Hercules, RE, RT and Tiger, the two latter sporting the trouble-prone Minarelli P4 engine.

== Motorcycles ==
Tempo also made motorcycles. The smallest one was actually a Corvette with a full effect version of the fan cooled 49 cc engine producing 4,3 hp. Sold as the Comet, this small motorcycle had a longer seat allowing two persons to ride. Similar versions of the Panter was sold asTrigger and Sprint, sporting a 5,2 hp full effect version of the wind cooled engine and somewhat different styling.

Some other examples:

- The World

1931–1934

98cc Sachs

Tank shifter and pedals.

First motorcycle produced by Øglænd.

- Standard

(98 cc with pedals made from 1934 to 1939 not to be confused with the 50s Standard)

1951–59

98, 125, 150 or 175cc Sachs

From 1953 with 2 seats.

- Villiers

1937–49

98, 125 or 150cc Villers engines.

Engine models used were 9D, 9DF, 10D, 10DF, 12D, and 30C .

- Sport

(1936-39 98 cc not to be confused with 60s model)

1959–66

125, 150 or 175cc Sachs.

- Luxus

1936–49

98cc

Kickstart and 11 liter chrome tank, twin exhaust from 1938

- CZ

1956 only

150 cc CZ engine.

- Swing

1957–59

125, 150 or 175 cc Sachs

First model with rear suspension and saddle for two instead of seats.

- Taifun

1960–68

125, 150 or 175 cc Sachs

Came in three versions : Taifun (color black only), Taifun Military (olive green with a slightly tuned 175cc Sachs engine, made for the Norwegian armed forces) and the "Blåtaifun" ("blue Taifun", sport model in blue only.)

- Cross

1958–66

125, 150 or 175 cc Sachs

Scrambler with raised suspension and upswept exhaust.

- Sprint

1967–72

50 or 100 cc Sachs

- Fighter

1969–72

100 or 125cc Sachs

Delivered in blue only

Last Tempo motorcycle produced, sold until 1973.

== The End of Tempo ==
Eventually, Tempo did not sell too well, due to the invasion of Japanese mopeds and motorcycles. Production of the Tempo Corvette and Panter in Norway ceased in 1983, but the Corvette was produced in Portugal until 1994, still sporting the fan cooled Sachs MLKAX engine. In an effort to survive in the 1980s and 1990s Tempo made mopeds with Minarelli engines, but they never sold as well as their Japanese counterparts partly due to having quality problems with the engines.

Today, the Tempo mopeds and motorcycles are in the focus of enthusiasts, and collected and restored around the country. Some models fetch sky high prices in the same range or higher than equivalent new bikes when sold among these enthusiasts.
