= Villa Geber =

Coordinates: 59.3319°N 18.1018°E

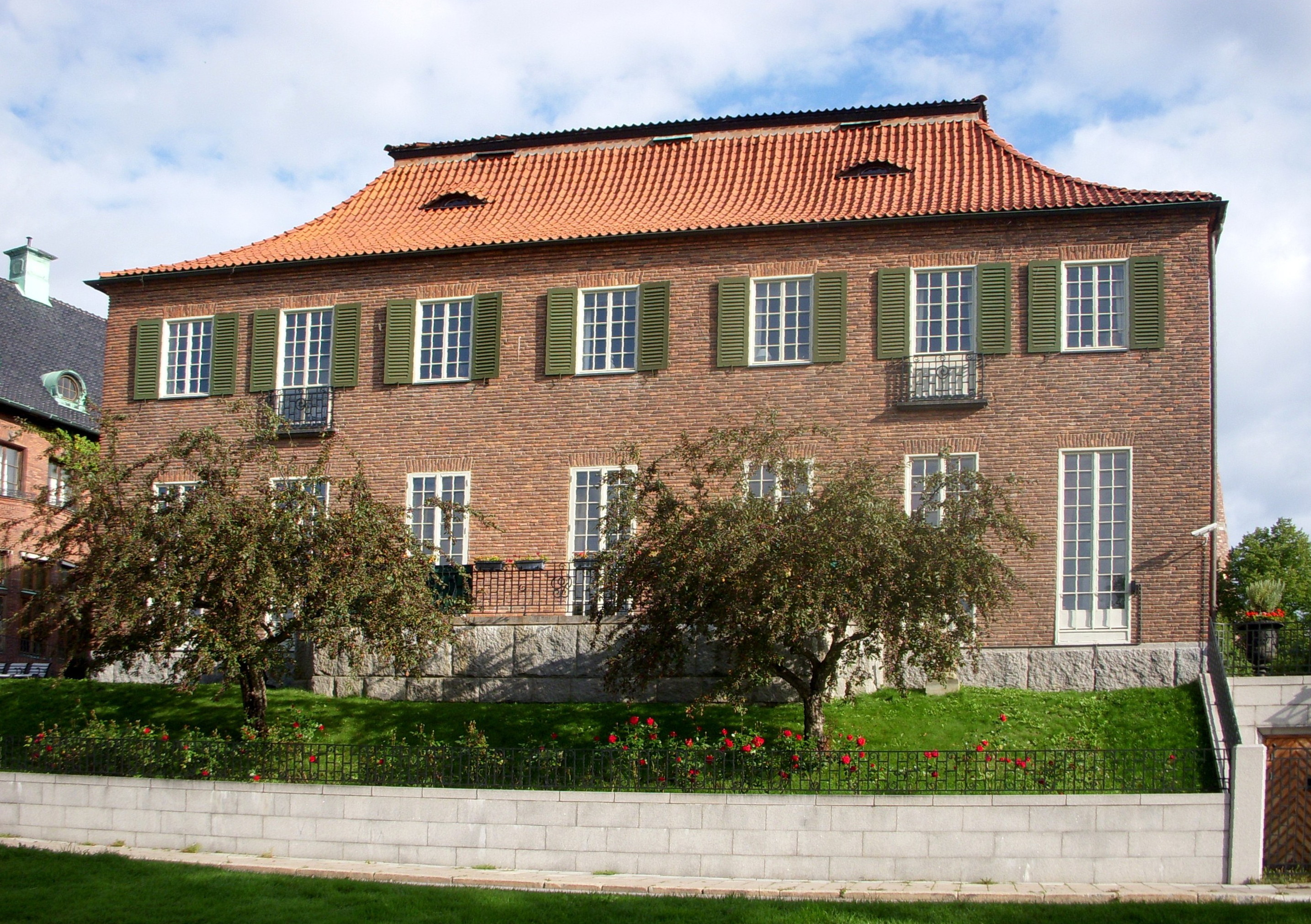
Villa Geber in 2008

Villa Geber is a property at Laboratoriegatan and Nobelgatan within Diplomatstaden in Stockholm, Sweden. It was designed by architect Ragnar Östberg and was built between 1911 and 1913, for banker Philip Geber.

== History ==
The villa was in the possession of consul general Karl Bergsten (1869–1953) during the 1920s until his death. Bergsten's daughter Elisabeth and her husband Sune Malmström moved there as well. After her husband died in 1961, Elisabeth continued to live there until her own death in 1998. Bergsten would later rename the property "Villa Dagmar" as a tribute to his wife. He owned an extensive art collection, which he displayed in the villa, with works by artists such as Titian, Rubens and Velázquez.

The villa was sold in 1999 for 35,000,000 (SEK) to the investor Claës Wachtmeister, who resold the property two years later for 69,860,000 (SEK) to the entrepreneur Salvatore Grimaldi and his wife Eva Swartz. The villa is today best known for being Sweden's second most expensive liveable property when it was sold to Grimaldi in 2000.

== Description ==
The villa has many similarities with Stockholm City Hall, which was built at the same time. Inspiration was taken from Venetian private palaces and Italian farms and medieval traditions. The main building has a manor-like 17th century inspired shape with Mansard roof, hip roof, and sided roof top. The facade is covered with red tile. The villa is 860 square meters.

The building tips to the north and it opens up to the seaside on the south, with several rooms with high paned French windows. From the north side, an opening leads to a stone-paved inner courtyard. It is a roofless miniature replica of the Blue Hall with a balcony and patterned marble floors.

== Historic images ==
Newly built Villa Geber, about 1914

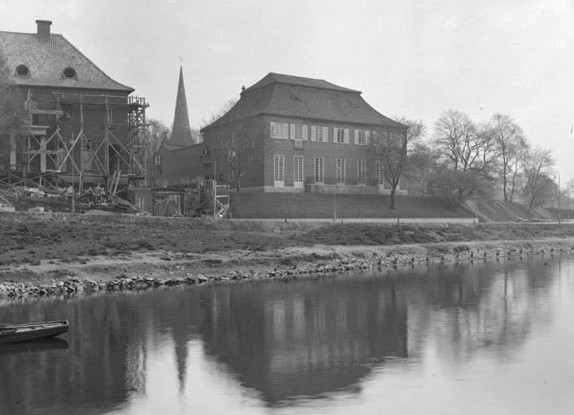
Facade towards Nobelgatan and Djurgårdsbrunnsviken

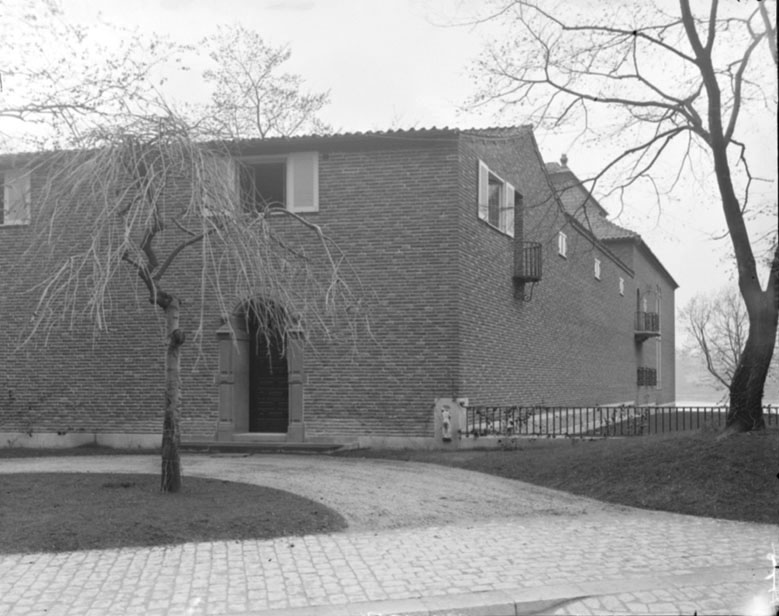
Entrance from Laboratoriegatan

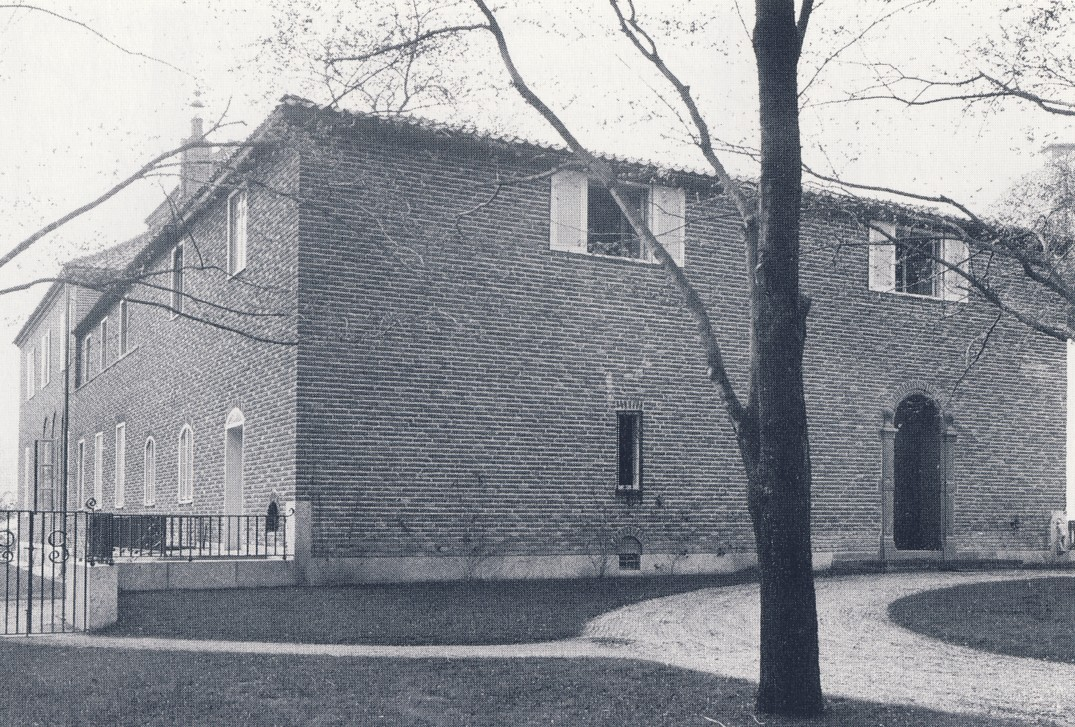
Entrance from Laboratoriegatan
