= Eva Swartz =

Swedish businessperson and civil servant (1956–2024)

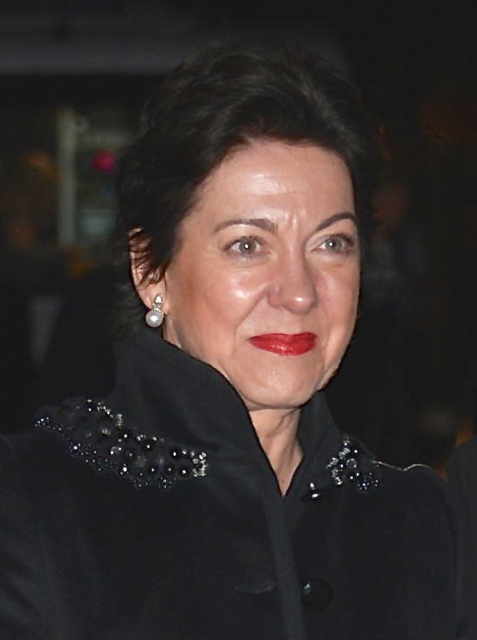
- Swartz in 2013
- Born: 15 April 1956; Engelbrekt Parish
- Died: 20 July 2024 (aged 68)
- Occupation: Film producer
- Awards: (2020)

Eva Birgitta Swartz Grimaldi (15 April 1956 – 20 July 2024) was a Swedish businesswoman.

== Biography ==
Swartz was born on 15 April 1956 in Stockholm, but grew up in Örebro. Her brother, Richard Swartz, is a writer and journalist; their great-grandfather, Carl Swartz, was Prime Minister of Sweden for a few months in 1917.

After university studies in foreign languages, predominantly Italian, Spanish and French, she was employed as an editor by the publishing house Coeckelberghs. From the late 1970s, Swartz worked for the Italian Cultural Institute in Stockholm, living in Trieste for some time in the 1980s.

Swartz began a career in the television industry in 1987, producing some of the first programmes for the commercial television channel TV3. For several years in the 1990s, she was CEO of the production company Meter Film & Television. In 1998, she started working as director of the entertainment and drama department at the television channel TV4. In 2002, she became programme director and deputy CEO at TV4.

Swartz became CEO of the publishing house Natur & Kultur in 2005. In 2007, she was appointed chairperson of an investigation into the future of Sweden's cultural politics by Lena Adelsohn Liljeroth, then Minister for Culture.

In 2012, Swartz left her position as CEO of Natur & Kultur. She continued to hold several leadership positions, for example as chairperson of the online pharmacy Apotea and the publishing house concern Norstedts Förlagsgrupp, and as a board member of Stockholm University and the Swedish Film Institute, among several other organizations and companies.

From 2005, Swartz was married to the Italian-born industrialist Salvatore Grimaldi. The couple lived in Villa Geber in Diplomatstaden, Stockholm. Swartz died after a long illness on 20 July 2024, at the age of 68.
