= Mel Pinto =

American businessman (1923–2021)

Mel Pinto (September 9, 1923 – March 28, 2021) was one of the first importers of European racing bikes into the United States in 1958 when he opened Mel Pinto Imports in northern Virginia and began selling Gitane bicycles on consignment. Later, Pinto was the first to import Shimano’s Dura-Ace components into the U.S.

In 1960, Pinto became a founding member of the Federation of Washington Area Bicycle Clubs, now known as the National Capital Velo Club, and in 1963 revived the moribund National Capital Open bicycle race in Washington, D.C., reestablishing it as an annual event on The Ellipse until the race's demise in 1988.

Pinto sold Mel Pinto Imports in 2009 and resided in Virginia outside of Washington, D.C. until his death in 2021.
