= Grimaldi Industri =

Swedish holding company

- Founded: 1970
- Founder: Salvatore Grimaldi
- Headquarters: Stockholm, Sweden
- Owner: Salvatore Grimaldi
- Website: www.grimaldi.se

Grimaldi Industri AB is a privately held holding company based in Stockholm, Sweden, which operates a range of businesses, primarily in the industrial, technology, and consumer goods sectors.

The group currently employs approximately 1,200 people globally and generates an annual revenue of around €350 million.

== Companies ==
- Cycleurope – A group of companies that manufacture bicycles and related items with the brands: Bianchi, Crescent, DBS, Everton, Gitane, Kildemoes, Koppla, Monark, Puch, Sjösala, Spectra, Tec
- Contento
- Grimaldis Mekaniska Verkstad
- Karlsson Spools
- Learnify
- Morgana
- Plockmatic International – develops and manufactures a range of document finishing
- Pricer
- 3nine

== Shareholders ==
Grimaldi is 100% owned by Salvatore Grimaldi.
