= Salvatore Grimaldi =

Swedish entrepreneur and speaker (born 1945)

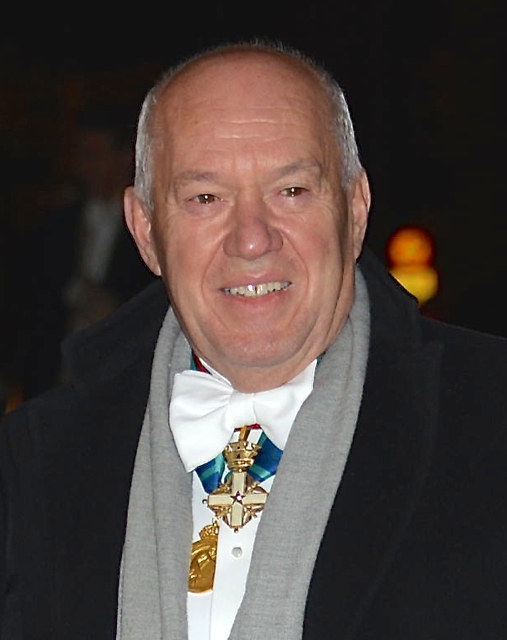
- Salvatore Grimaldi in 2013
- Born: 25 May 1945 (age 81); Taranto, Italy
- Occupation: Entrepreneur
- Years active: 1970-present

Salvatore Grimaldi (Italian: [salvaˈtoːre ɡriˈmaldi]; Swedish pronunciation: [salvaˈtôːrɛ ɡrɪˈmǎldɪ]; born 25 May 1945) is a Swedish entrepreneur and speaker. He is a former chairman of the business-owners association Företagarna and the CEO of Grimaldi Industri AB.

== Early life ==
Salvatore Grimaldi was born in Taranto, Italy, on 25 May 1945. He migrated from Italy to Västerås, Sweden, with his parents in the early 1950s. His mother came to Sweden to visit her brothers, who had found work at a company called ASEA. She found Sweden to be such a beautiful country that she decided to stay.

== Career ==
After working at Volvo, Grimaldi founded a grind mill in his own garage in Köping in 1970. In 1982, he started acquiring companies, including Bianchi, Monark, Crescent and Stiga. He then restructured these companies and sold off portions of the companies that did not contribute to his business objectives. Grimaldi ultimately acquired substantial wealth from these transactions.

== Personal life ==
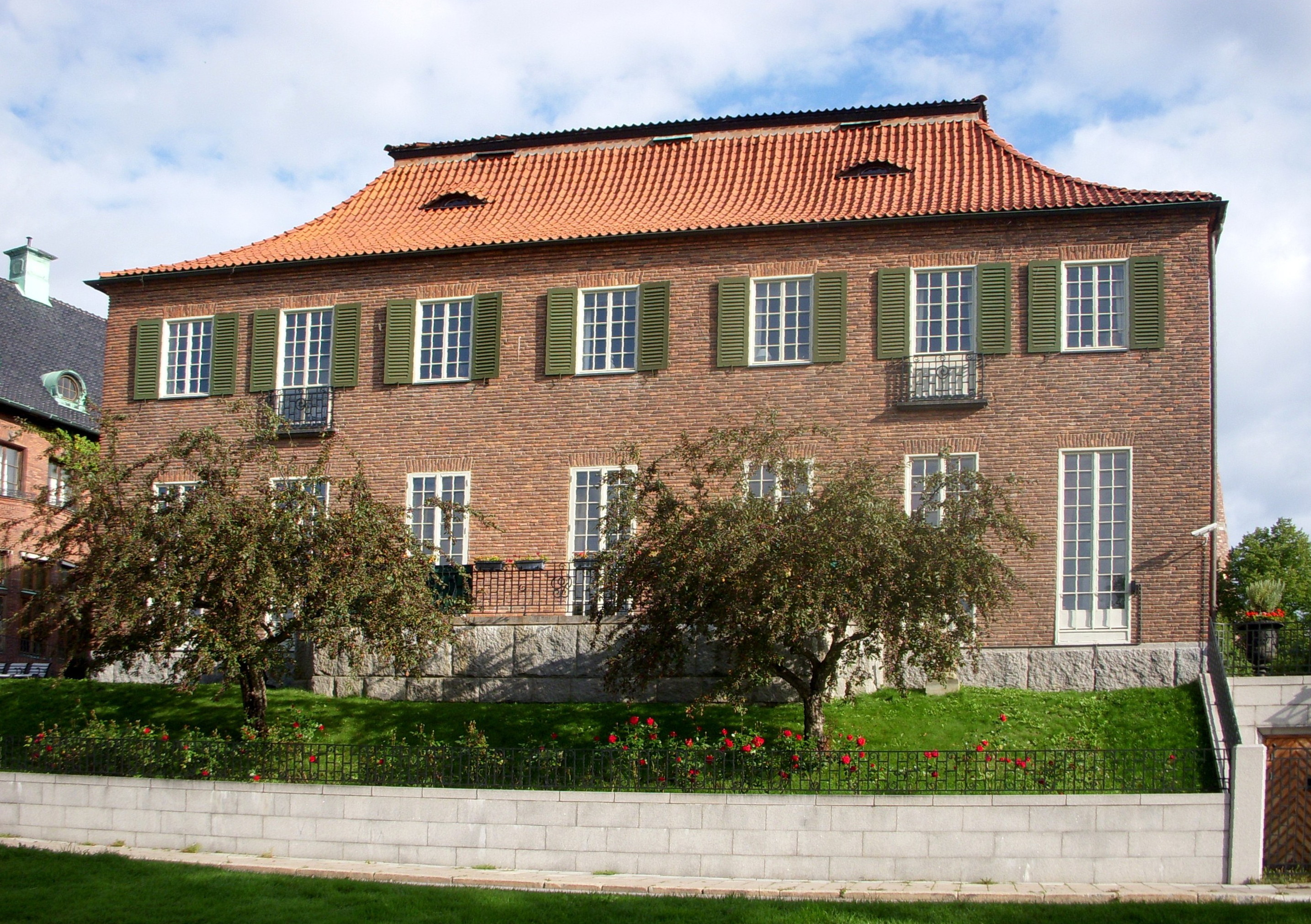
Villa Geber, Grimaldi's home since 2001

In 2001, Grimaldi received attention from local media when he bought Villa Geber in Diplomatstaden, Stockholm for around 70 million Swedish kronor. At the time, Villa Geber was one of the most expensive private homes in Sweden. On July 1, 2002, he presented an episode of the Sveriges Radio show Sommar i P1. Grimaldi was the chairman of Sweden's largest business owners organisation Företagarna between 2004 and 2006. He is also the chairman of Italienska Handelskammaren, Accademia Italiana della Cucina, Direct Försäkringsmäklarna Västerås. In 2004, Grimaldi was awarded an Honorary Doctorate at Mälardalens College. In 1988, he was awarded the Royal Patriotic Society's Business Medal for his entrepreneurship and his work contributing to important progress of Swedish businesses. In 2011, Network Europe named Grimaldi "[t]he richest immigrant in Sweden", noting that his assets were valued at 1.6 billion SEK.

== See also ==
- Grimaldi Industri
