= Jonas Øglænd =

Norwegian businessman (1847–1931)

- Born: 18 January 1847; Høyland Municipality, Norway
- Died: 6 October 1931 (aged 84)
- Occupation: Entrepreneur

Jonas Øglænd (18 January 1847 – 6 October 1931) was a Norwegian merchant and industrial entrepreneur.

He was born in Høyland Municipality, as the youngest of ten siblings at a small peasant farm. After he was confirmated, he moved to Sandnes to work for two of his older brothers who had business there.

He started a small business on his own in Sandnes in 1868. In the late 1890s his sons acquired the Scandinavian agency for the bicycle brand "The World". They eventually started producing their own bicycles, and the factory developed into the largest bicycle factory in Norway. Øglænd also started a cloth factory in 1926. After Øgland's death the family-owned factories went through further expansion. The bicycle brand D.B.S. was introduced in 1932, and the factory also produced the moped brand Tempo.
