= Gitane =

French bicycle manufacturer

- Product type: Bicycles
- Current owner: Re_Cycles France (Grimaldi Industri)
- Country: France
- Introduced: 1925; 101 years ago
- Related brands: Cycles Peugeot
- Website: www.cycles-gitane.fr

Gitane is a French manufacturer of bicycles based in Machecoul, France; the name "Gitane" means gypsy woman. The brand was synonymous with French bicycle racing from the 1960s through the mid-1980s, sponsoring riders such as Jacques Anquetil (1963–1965), Lucien Van Impe (1974–1976), Bernard Hinault (1975–1983), Laurent Fignon (1982–1988), and Greg LeMond (1981–1984). It is owned by Grimaldi Industri AB.

== History ==
Cycles Gitane have their roots in 1925, when Marcel Brunelière opened a smith and agricultural repair works at Machecoul in the Loire-Atlantique region of France. He began making parts for bicycles and the following year opened a further workshop to assemble bicycles for G.M.B and Marbru.

Brunelière began making his own bicycles in 1930, choosing the name Gitane (meaning "gypsy" [feminine]). He added light motorcycles in the 1950s. The name changed to Micmo in 1960 but continued to sell Gitane bicycles. Nearly a third of Micmo was owned by Renault, the car-maker, which had acquired 30 per cent of the shares in 1974. In 1976 it bought the rest.

Gitane bicycles were first imported into the U.S. in 1958 by Mel Pinto Imports of Virginia, and as such were among the first European racing bicycles to be regularly imported into that country.

The arrival of a new director-general at the head of Renault in 1985, Georges Besse, led the company to sell Micmo to raise capital. Micmo continued and then in 1992 joined Peugeot and the Spanish company, BH, to form the Cycleurope group to compete with growing competition from Asia. Later, BH sold Gitane/Peugeot and the rest of Cycleurope to the Swedish Monark conglomerate.

== Sponsorships ==
Gitane sponsored its first professionals in 1948. From 1953 to 1955 it equipped Jean Stablinski. In 1960 it helped back Rapha–Gitane–Dunlop and Rudi Altig. In 1963 and 1964, Gitane bicycles won the Tour de France, ridden by Jacques Anquetil.

Renault sponsored a professional team in the 1970s and, since it owned Micmo, the company behind Gitane, made Gitane the co-sponsor. Riders on Gitanes included Lucien Van Impe, Bernard Hinault, Laurent Fignon and Greg LeMond, all winners of the Tour de France.

Gitane then sponsored the Système U team led by Laurent Fignon, RMO led by Charly Mottet, and Toshiba–Look led by Jean-François Bernard.

Gitane sponsored mountain-bike teams in the 1990s.

Gitane returned to road cycling after several years' absence, backing Française des Jeux and BigMat–Auber 93. For 2010, Gitane sponsored the Saur–Sojasun team with its new line of Definitive Gitane "The One" ISP bicycles. Gitane bicycles are available in Europe only. The aluminum and steel Gitanes are still built in the factories in Machecoul (the original Gitane factory) and the Cycleurope facility at Romilly Sur Seine (the old Peugeot factory) in France, while all carbon bikes are built in Asia.
