= Bianchi (company) =

Italian bicycle manufacturer

Coordinates: 45.5469672°N 9.5988803°E

F.I.V. Edoardo Bianchi S.p.A.
- Industry: Manufacturing
- Founded: Milan, Italy, in 1885; 141 years ago
- Founder: Edoardo Bianchi
- Headquarters: Treviglio (Bergamo), Italy
- Area served: Worldwide
- Products: Bicycles, E-bike and related components
- Parent: Cycleurope Group
- Website: bianchi.com

F.I.V. Edoardo Bianchi S.p.A., commonly known as Bianchi ([ˈbjaŋki]), is the world's oldest bicycle manufacturing company in existence, having pioneered the use of equal-sized wheels with pneumatic rubber tires. The company was founded in Italy in 1885 and in addition to bicycles it produced motorcycles from 1897 to 1967. In 1955 the joint-venture Autobianchi was created together with Fiat and Pirelli for the manufacturing of cars – Autobianchi was subsequently sold to Fiat in 1969.

Throughout its modern era, Bianchi has been associated with the Italian Giro d'Italia and Tour de France winners, Fausto Coppi, Marco Pantani and Felice Gimondi.

Bianchi wordmark used until 2016.

== Bianchi bicycles ==
=== History ===
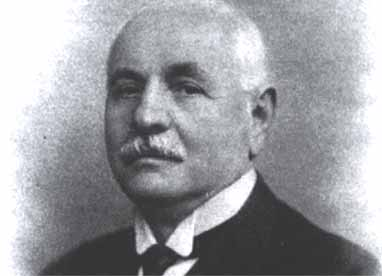
Edoardo Bianchi

Edoardo Bianchi, a 21-year-old medical instrument maker, started his bicycle-manufacturing business in a small shop at 7 Via Nirone, Milan in 1885. Bianchi pioneered the front-wheel caliper brake. One of his first developments was to make the front wheel smaller and use the chain invented by Frenchman Vincent to reduce pedal height. In doing so, he created a safe and modern bicycle. Compared to its predecessors, it was much easier to drive because it was easier to balance. He continued to improve the bicycle and developed a construction with wheels of almost the same size. In 1888, he made the first bicycle with Dunlop tires.

In 1888, Bianchi moved to a larger shop on Via Bertani. It came into contact with John Boyd Dunlop and Giovanni Battista Pirelli, whereupon pneumatic tires were introduced as bicycle tires.

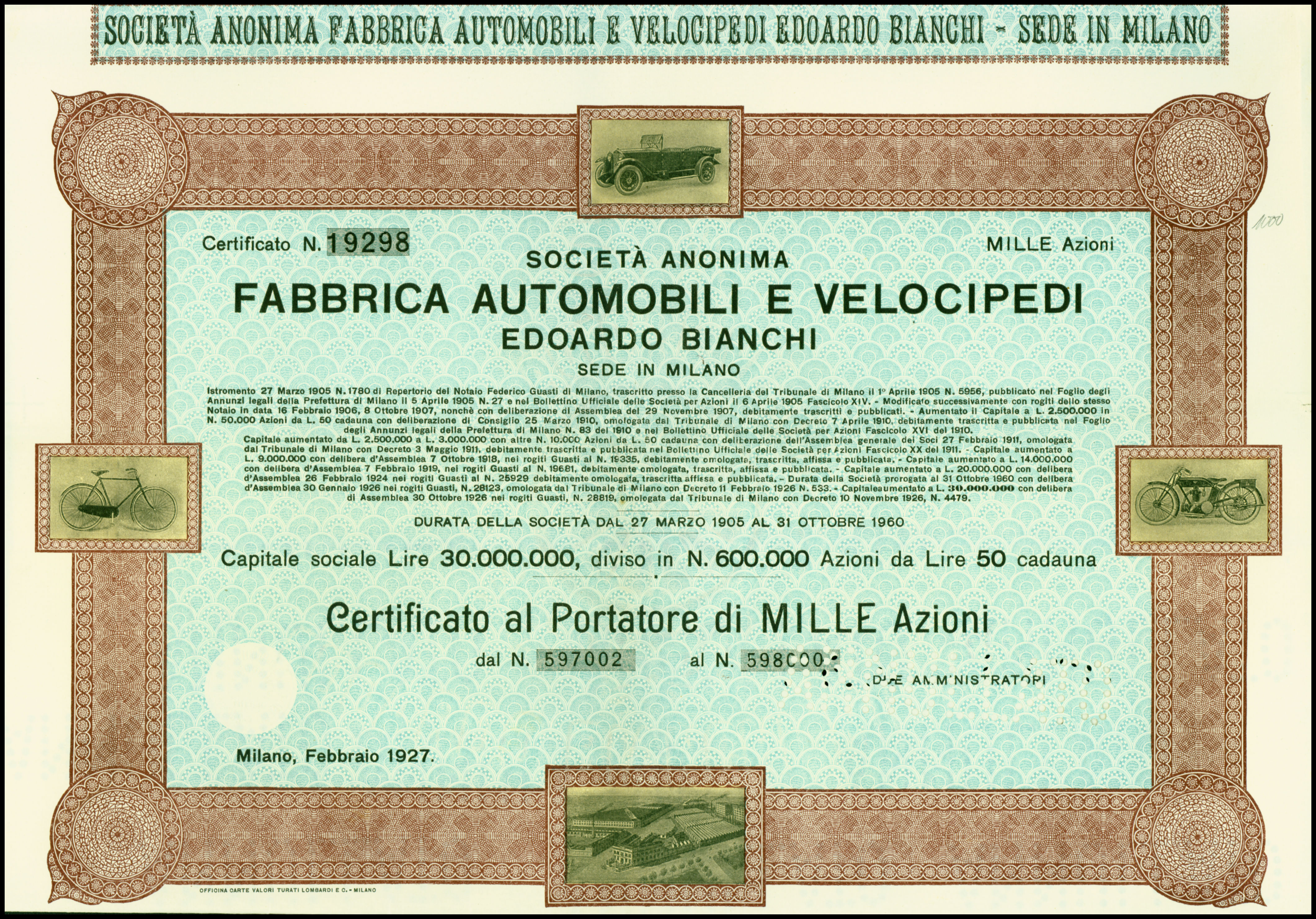
Share of the Fabbrica Automobili e Velocipedi Edoardo Bianchi from February 1927, unissued

As early as 1890, the next move to larger rooms on Via Borghetto was necessary. Series production began here. In 1895, he built the first women's bicycle for Queen Margaret of Italy. At the same time, he began using his bicycles at sporting events to test new technical developments.

In 1897, tests began on a bicycle with an auxiliary motor. A De Dion-Bouton built-in motor was mounted in front of the bicycle handlebars and drove the front wheel.

1899 followed a motor tricycle in the style of the De Dion Bouton motor tricycle, a quadricycle and the first real car.

Due to the increasing outflow figures, especially for bicycles, construction of a new plant on Via Nino Bixio began in 1900, which was occupied in 1902.

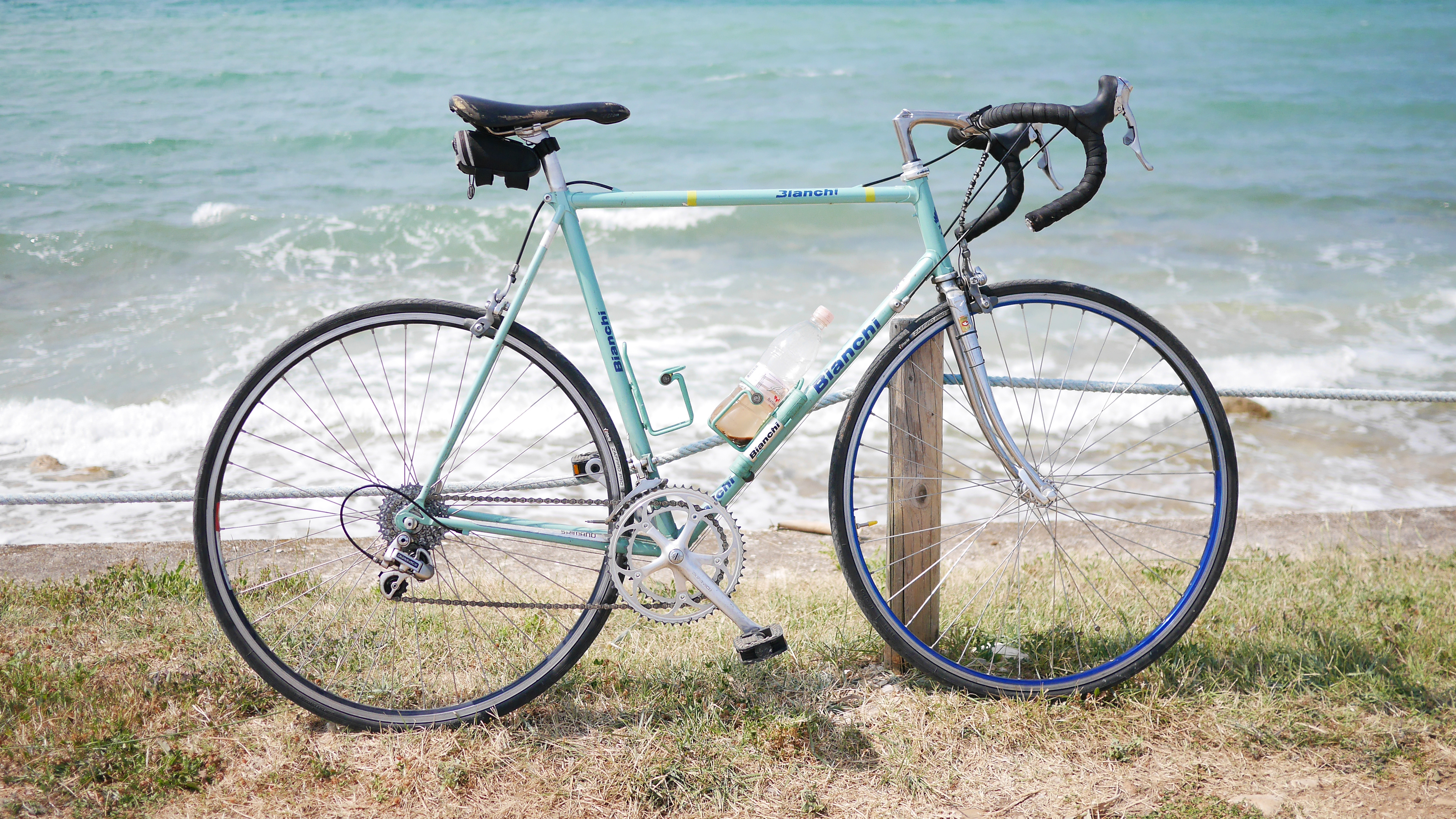
Bianchi from late 1980s with Cro-Mo frame and 2×8 Shimano Dura Ace

Since May 1997, the company has been part of Cycleurope Group, which is owned by the Swedish company of Grimaldi Industri AB.

Bianchi and Ferrari announced in July 2017, a partnership to produce a new range of 'high-end' models. The SF01 was their first collaboration bike.

Bianchi is currently led by CEO Bob Ippolito, who before joining Bianchi was the executive vice president and general manager of Pacific Cycle, headquartered in Madison, Wisconsin.

For several years, Bianchi has also been involved in the research of new alternative mobility systems through its Lif-E program, dedicated to smart electric mobility. In 2019, the company introduced the E-SUV (Electric Sports Utility Vehicle), an electric bike designed to move in full harmony with the environment. During 2021, Bianchi started a renovation project of the Treviglio factory, with the aim of bringing the production of carbon frames to Italy in the coming years, while also leading to an overall increase in the activity related to the assembly of bicycles. The project also includes the creation of a museum dedicated to the history of the company on site.

=== Bianchi USA ===
Bianchi USA is the United States division of Bianchi based in Hayward, California. It oversees the production of bicycles built in Taiwan and in Italy for the worldwide market.

=== Product lines ===
==== 2017 models ====
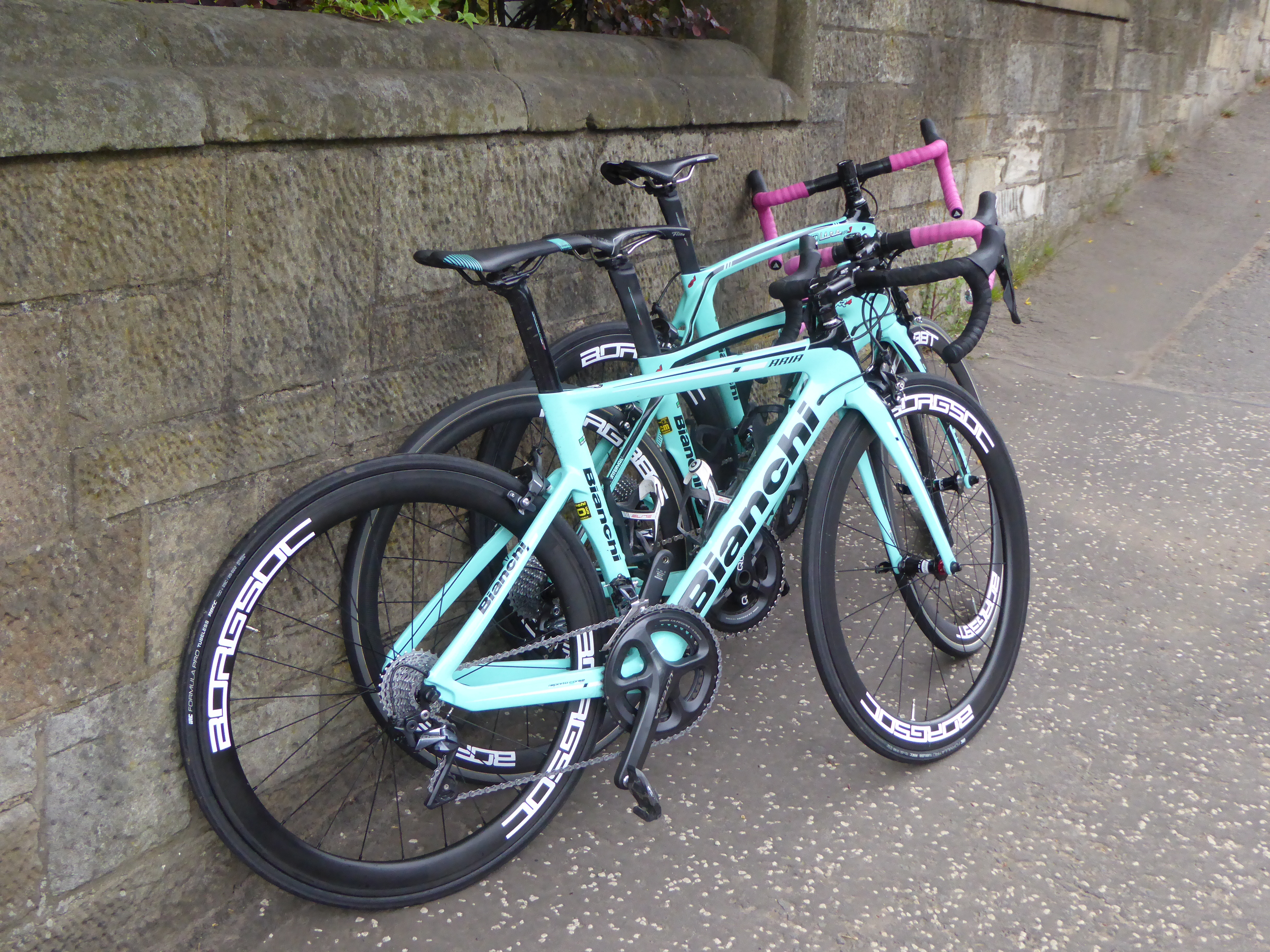
Bianchi road models in 2018

data from Bianchi website

Racing
Specialissima
Oltre XR4
Oltre XR3
Oltre XR1
Sempre
Freccia Celeste
Oltre XR2
Aria

Endurance racing

These models are also manufactured with women's-specific geometry under the name Dama Bianca ("Lady in White"), a reference to champion Bianchi rider Fausto Coppi's lover Giulia Occhini.

Infinito
Intenso
Intrepida
Vertigo
Impulso
Via Nirone 7

Triathlon and time-trial
Aquila
Aria
Pico Alu
Pico crono (carbon)

Cyclocross
Zolder
Zurigo

All road
Allroad
Vigorelli
Volpe
Lupo
Strada

Vintage

Manufactured according to a configuration and with materials common in the late 20th century

Eroica

== Racing and sponsorship ==
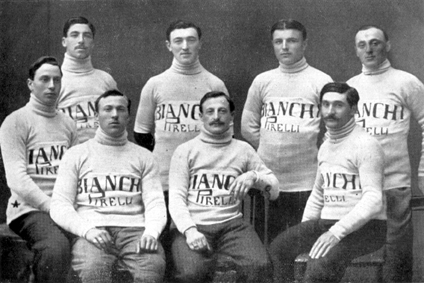
The Bianchi–Pirelli team of the 1911 Giro d'Italia

In 1899, Giovanni Tommaselli won the first international cycling victory for Bianchi at the world championship of track racing: the Grand Prix of Paris. During the existence of the Bianchi team in Italy in 1919–1920, Bianchi was also a co-sponsor of a French team that was called Peugeot–Bianchi–Pirelli which according to a historical cycling website, the team rode on Peugeot bikes.

The Bianchi reputation began when the company sponsored Giovanni Tommasello, the winner of the Grand Prix de Paris sprint competition in 1899. Fifteen years later it was making 45,000 bicycles, 1,500 motorcycles and 1,000 cars a year.

In 1935, Bianchi sponsored Costante Girardengo, one of the first Italian stars on the road, and its bicycle sales rose to 70,000 a year.

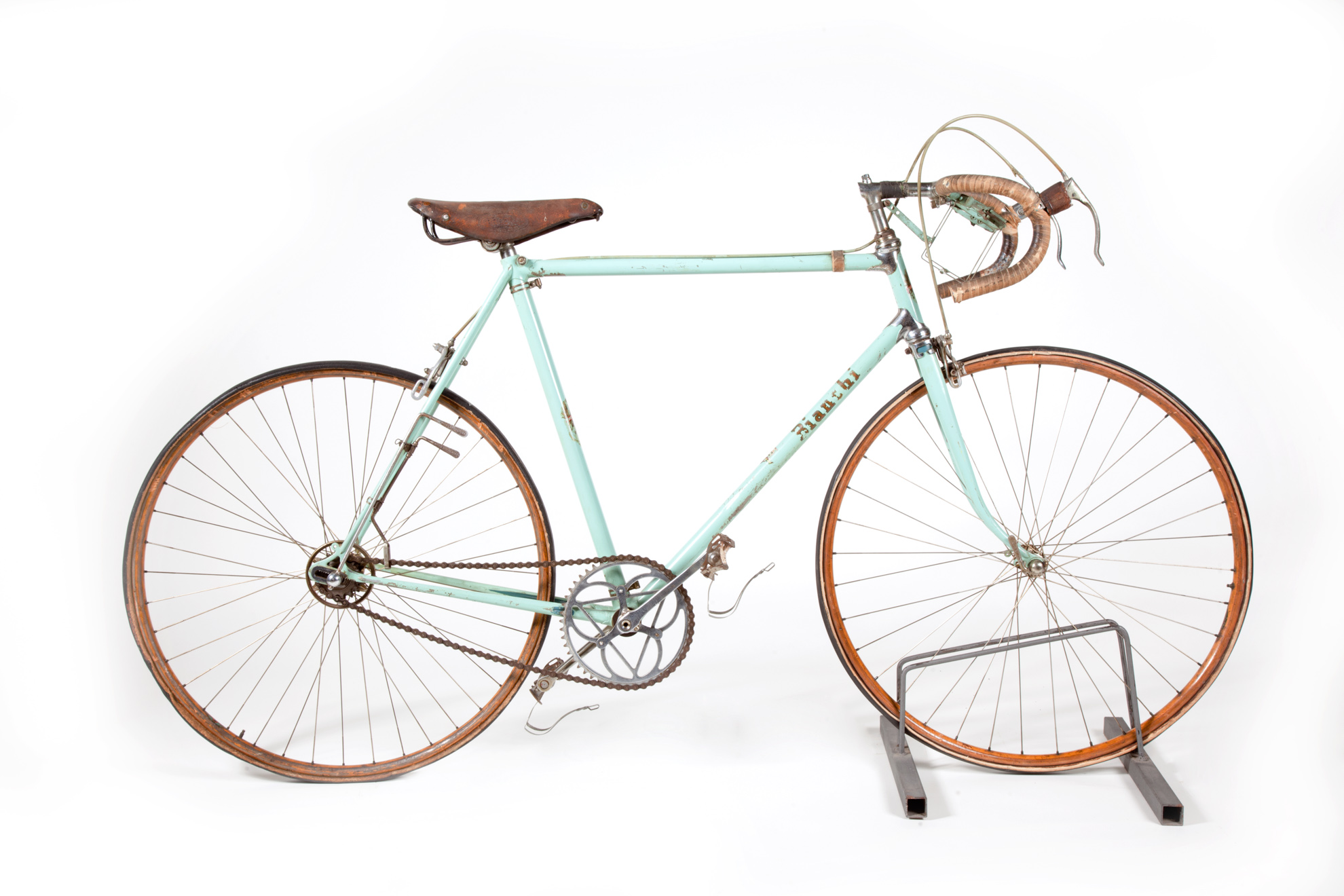
1950-1952 Bianchi bicycle used by Fausto Coppi. In the collections of Museo nazionale della scienza e della tecnologia Leonardo da Vinci of Milan.

In 1945, Fausto Coppi joined the team and would stay with the team until 1956 and 1958. It has been said that the team of the mid-1940s was built around Coppi. During this time the Tour de France was disputed by national teams and Coppi won the Tour in 1949 and 1952. Coppi won the Giro d'Italia for the team in 1947, 1949, 1952 and 1953. Coppi became the first cyclist in history to achieve the Giro-Tour double. For which it was suggested at the time that he was the greatest cyclist ever seen. During this time, the directeur sportifs were Giovanni Tragella and Franco Aguggini. In 1950 Fausto Coppi won the Paris–Roubaix on a Bianchi equipped with what was later named the Campagnolo Paris–Roubaix derailleur gear, for which Bianchi bicycles featured the necessary special drop-outs until 1954. He won the race by two and a half minutes on a bicycle equipped with Universal brakes, Bianchi steel handlebars and stem, a Regina chain and a four-speed freewheel with shaped teeth. It also had Nisi rims, Campagnolo hubs and Pirelli tyres. It was made for sale only in 57 and 59 cm, smaller than the bike that Coppi used. A variation known as the Campione Del Mondo followed Coppi's win in the 1953 world championship.

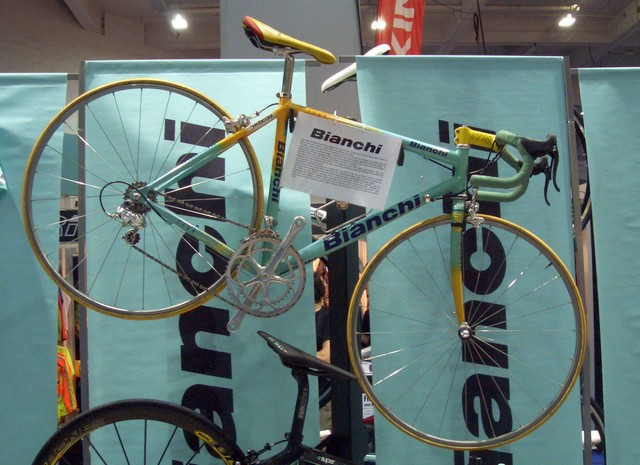
Bianchi used by Marco Pantani during the 1998 Tour de France

Riders of different eras have been associated with Bianchi including Felice Gimondi, who continues his association with the company. Recent riders include Danilo Di Luca, Mario Cipollini, Gianni Bugno, Laurent Fignon, Marco Pantani, Moreno Argentin and Jan Ullrich. The most demanding rider may have been Pantani. Sara Mercante, head of Bianchi's research and development, said: "Pantani had very specific ideas about what he wanted. He had 30 different frames a year from us—with different angles and weights on each one. He changed his bike after every ride. I'd go and meet him during the Giro d'Italia and the Tour and discuss improvements with him. He'd ask to have the geometry changed by, say, half a degree, just to make sure the bike was absolutely perfect. He'd want different angles for different races. He's ask us to tweak the length of the top tube by a millimetre or by half a degree. Pantani was quite obsessive."

Team Bianchi was a makeshift team that was put together from the remnants of the Coast team in time for the 2003 Tour de France. Team Coast had been unable to pay the salaries of their riders and Bianchi took over the team and the role of title sponsor. Coast had recently signed Jan Ullrich following his departure from Team Telekom after his drunk driving and amphetamine use. During the 2003 tour while riding for Bianchi, Ullrich placed second to Lance Armstrong by just 61 seconds, his closest ever margin in any of Armstrong's seven victorious years.

After the cycling season of 2003 ended, Bianchi became co-sponsor of the Alessio–Bianchi team and again they were a co-sponsor of the Liquigas-Bianchi team for the 2005 season. In 2005 Bianchi also became the co-sponsor of the Norwegian cycling team Team Maxbo Bianchi, a continental cycling team, with whom they co-sponsored until the end of the 2010 season.

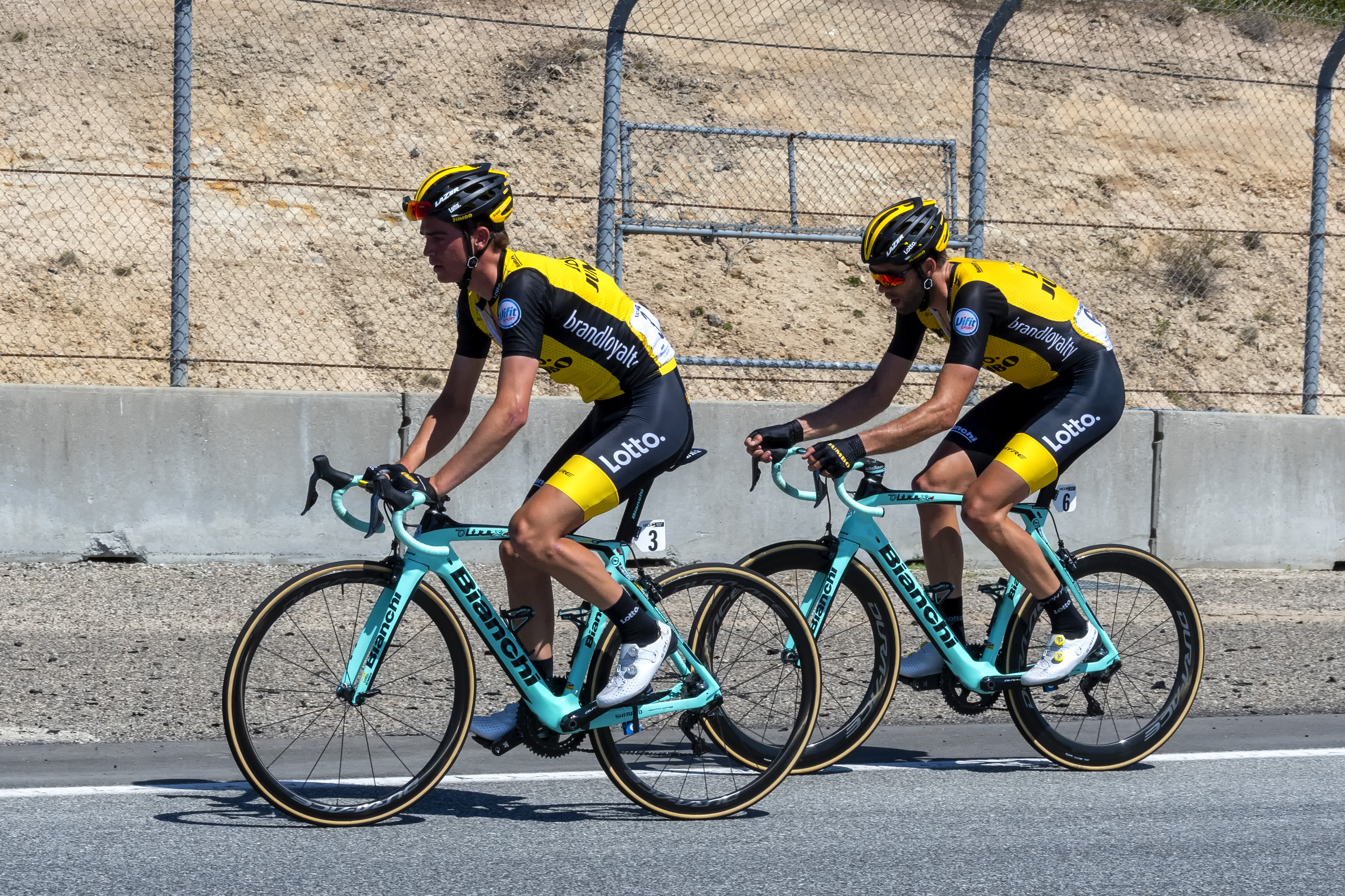
Sepp Kuss (left) and Maarten Wynants (right) of Team LottoNL-Jumbo riding Bianchi bicycles at the 2018 Tour of California

Until 2007, Bianchi was a cosponsor of the UCI ProTour team, Liquigas. In October 2011, for the 2012 season, it was announced that Bianchi had been signed to a two-year deal to co-sponsor and supply bikes to the UCI ProTeams Vacansoleil–DCM and Androni Giocattoli–Venezuela. These sponsorships continued in 2013 and for 2014, with Vacansoleil–DCM ceasing to exist, Bianchi again supplied Androni Giocattoli–Venezuela for a further year, and the then new Belkin Pro Cycling team. In 2015, the latter became LottoNL–Jumbo and Bianchi's only UCI Pro Continental sponsored road team. Bianchi supplied Team BikeExchange for the 2021 season Bianchi supplied Arkéa–Samsic for the 2023 season.

Bianchi became involved in sponsorship in Mountain biking in the early nineties. Bruno Zanchi won the first World Championship for Bianchi in 1991 in the downhill speciality. Two years later, Dario Acquaroli became World Champion in cross country for Bianchi. From 2000 to 2006, the Bianchi MTB (Bianchi-Motorex and Bianchi-Agos) team dominated the sport with José Antonio Hermida and multiple World Champion Julien Absalon. In 2007 the team was renamed Gewiss–Bianchi.

== Colour and logo ==
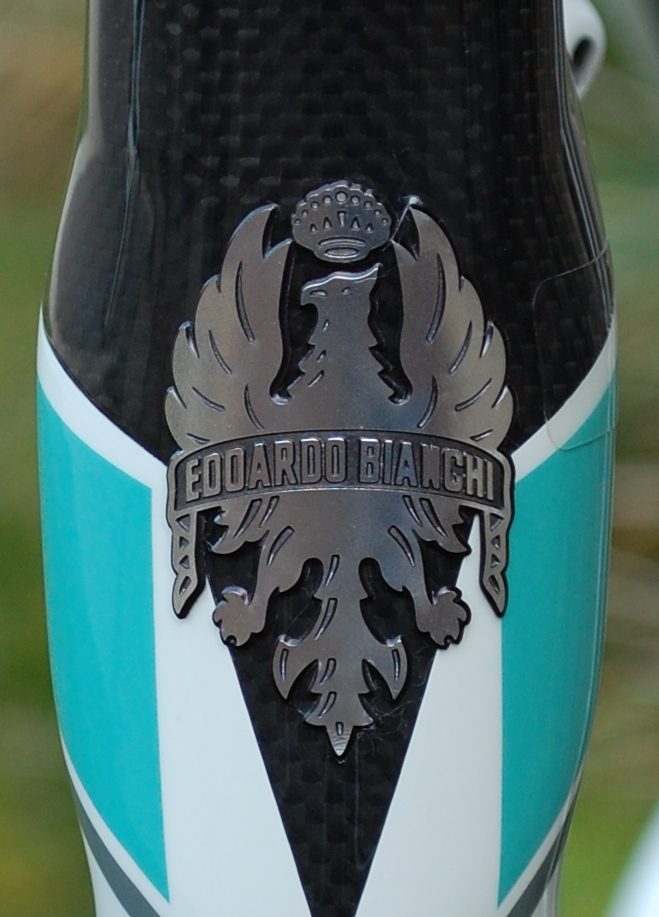
The Bianchi logo as seen on a Bianchi 928 C2C

Bianchi bicycles are traditionally painted Celeste, a turquoise also known as Bianchi Green, (and sometimes, incorrectly Tiffany Blue, a trademarked colour). Contradictory myths say Celeste is the colour of the Milan sky, the eye colour of a former queen of Italy for whom Edoardo Bianchi made a bicycle and that it was a mixture of surplus military paint. The shade has changed over the years, sometimes more blue, then more green.

The crowned eagle of the company logo is an adaptation of the former royal crest.

== Motor production ==
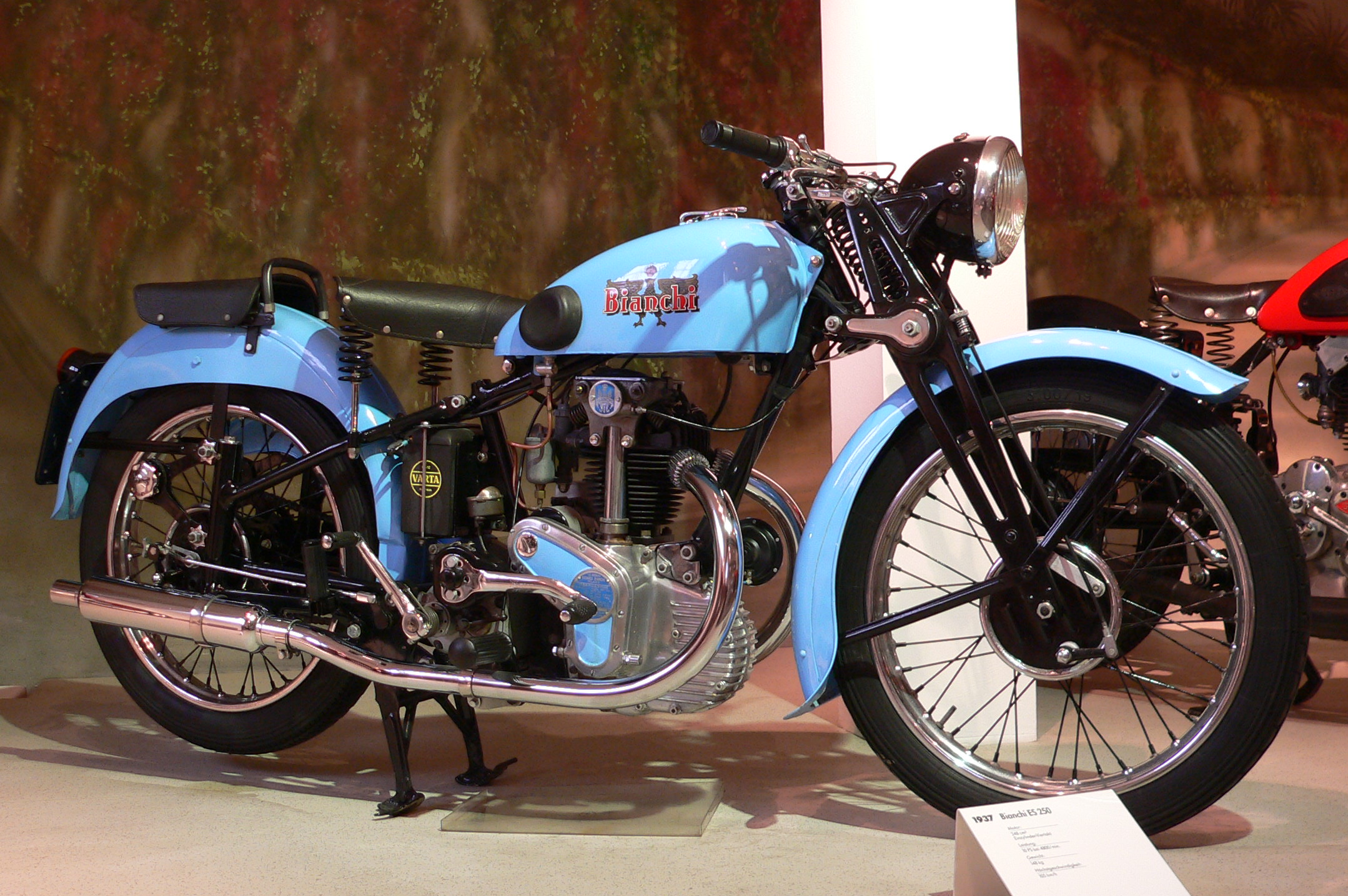
A Bianchi ES 250 motorcycle of 1937

Bianchi also took part in motorcycle races, where one of its first riders was Tazio Nuvolari, whom Ferdinand Porsche called "the greatest driver of the past, the present, and the future."

The company began making trucks in the 1930s and supplied the Italian army during World War II . It was that that brought the end of production shortly after peace returned because the factory had been so heavily bombed.

Bianchi continued with motorcycles, particularly the 125cc Bianchina and the Aquilotto, an auxiliary motor for a conventional bicycles. Bianchi took on Lino Tonti as its research engineer in 1959. It produced 250, 350 and 500cc machines and took part in grands prix in 1960. The company also produced a model for the Italian army and a civilian scooter, the Orsetto 80. Piaggio bought out Bianchi Motorcycles in 1967.

In 1955, Bianchi created a car brand, Autobianchi, in collaboration with Pirelli and Fiat. The three turned out only a handful of models, almost exclusively small cars, the biggest being the short-lived Autobianchi A111. Traditionally, Autobianchi motor vehicles cost more than equivalent Fiat models.

Fiat used Autobianchi to test new production concepts such as glass fibre and front-wheel drive. Eventually, Fiat bought out Autobianchi and integrated it with Lancia. Autobianchi are no longer in production beginning from 1995 when, everywhere except Italy, its Y10 hatchback was rebranded a Lancia.

== See also ==
- List of Italian companies
- Liquigas-Bianchi ProTour team
