= List of United States tornadoes in May 2009 =

This is a list of all tornadoes that were confirmed by local offices of the National Weather Service in the United States in May 2009.

== United States yearly total ==
Confirmed tornadoes by Enhanced Fujita rating
EFU	EF0	EF1	EF2	EF3	EF4	EF5	Total
0	695	348	82	20	2	0	1159

== May ==
Confirmed tornadoes by Enhanced Fujita rating
EFU	EF0	EF1	EF2	EF3	EF4	EF5	Total
0	115	65	18	2	0	0	202

Note: 2 tornadoes were confirmed in the final totals, but do not have a listed rating.

=== May 1 event ===
List of reported tornadoes - Friday, May 1, 2009
EF#	Location	County	Coord.	Time (UTC)	Path length	Damage
Tennessee
EF1	SE of Hohenwald	Lewis, Lawrence	35.43°N 87.50°W	1925	4.5 miles (7.2 km)	Several large campers were damaged or flipped injuring two people. Hundreds of trees were snapped or uprooted.
EF1	NW of Campbellsville	Giles	35.33°N 87.20°W	2005	1.1 miles (1.8 km)	Several outbuildings destroyed and minor roof damage to several homes
Texas
EF0	E of O'Brien	Haskell	33.37°N 99.86°W	2047	unknown	Brief tornado spotted by local law enforcement.
EF0	N of Rule	Haskell	33.25°N 99.90°W	2112	unknown	Brief tornado spotted by a storm chaser.
EF0	NW of Stamford	Haskell	33.02°N 99.83°W	2223	unknown	Tornado spotted in an open field.
Arkansas
EF0	WSW of Nail	Newton	35.80°N 93.35°W	0127	0.5 miles (0.80 km)	Tin was scattered and trees were downed.
EF0	S of Treat	Pope	35.60°N 93.12°W	0211	0.3 miles (0.48 km)	Damage limited to trees in the Ozark National Forest.
Sources: SPC Storm Reports for May 1, 2009, NWS Nashville, NWS Little Rock, NCDC Storm Data

=== May 2 event ===
List of reported tornadoes - Saturday, May 2, 2009
EF#	Location	County	Coord.	Time (UTC)	Path length	Damage
Mississippi
EF0	WNW of Eggville	Lee	34.34°N 88.57°W	1848	unknown	One mobile home was heavily damaged. Power lines and trees were knocked down.
EF0	N of Eggville	Lee	34.34°N 88.58°W	1850	unknown	Second tornado in the area knocked a few trees down.
EF0	Mantachie area	Itawamba	34.32°N 88.49°W	1900	2 miles (3.2 km)	One house sustained minor damage, a shed was demolished and numerous trees were broken.
EF0	SE of Fairview	Itawamba	34.37°N 88.32°W	1922	2 miles (3.2 km)	Many trees were damaged.
Texas
EF0	E of Greenville	Hunt	33.12°N 96.06°W	2104	3 miles (4.8 km)	Tornado observed by television crews with no damage.
EF0	SW of DeKalb	Bowie	33.51°N 94.62°W	2144	1 mile (1.6 km)	Damage limited to trees.
EF1	N of Douglassville	Cass	33.19°N 94.35°W	2251	2 miles (3.2 km)	Numerous trees snapped or uprooted with minor shingle damage to some homes.
EF0	SE of Leesburg	Camp	33.00°N 94.97°W	0156	2 miles (3.2 km)	Damage limited to trees that are snapped or uprooted.
Alabama
EF0	Luxapallila	Fayette	33.72°N 87.88°W	2220	0.1 miles (0.16 km)	Brief tornado touchdown in a wooded area with minimal damage.
EF0	Hightogy	Lamar	33.67°N 88.09°W	2227	2.5 miles (4.0 km)	Damage limited to trees.
Arkansas
EF1	NW of Fouke	Miller	33.26°N 93.89°W	2313	3.75 miles (6.04 km)	Damage mostly to trees and power lines though a porch was blown off a home. There were three people injured when a power pole fell on a car.
Sources: SPC Storm Reports for May 2, 2009, NWS Shreveport (PIS), NWS Memphis, NWS Birmingham (PIS), NCDC Storm Data

=== May 3 event (Southeast derecho) ===
List of reported tornadoes - Sunday, May 3, 2009
EF#	Location	County/Parish	Coord.	Time (UTC)	Path length	Damage
Texas
EF1	E of Pennington	Trinity	31.20°N 95.16°W	1144	2 miles (3.2 km)	A shed was destroyed and trailer was shifted off its foundation. Numerous trees were also snapped.
Mississippi
EF0	SW of Thomastown	Madison, Leake	32.84°N 89.74°W	1200	4 miles (6.4 km)	Damage limited to trees.
EF1	SW of Port Gibson	Claiborne	31.89°N 91.06°W	1455	4.4 miles (7.1 km)	Damage limited to trees, some of which were large.
EF1	N of Clem	Jefferson Davis, Covington, Simpson	31.75°N 89.79°W	1607	9 miles (14 km)	A travel trailer was destroyed while three chicken houses, a mobile home and a church were damaged. Trees were also uprooted or snapped.
EF1	S of Mount Olive	Covington, Smith	31.69°N 89.66°W	1612	20 miles (32 km)	Damage to numerous trees, street signs and several houses.
EF1	E of Taylorsville	Smith, Jasper	31.83°N 89.36°W	1630	5.2 miles (8.4 km)	One chicken house was destroyed and a second one was damaged. A mobile home and a shed had roof damaged and multiple trees were damaged.
EF1	NE of Stringer	Jasper	31.90°N 89.23°W	1641	0.6 miles (0.97 km)	Large pines were uprooted and snapped.
Louisiana
EF0	SE of Castor	Bienville	32.22°N 93.13°W	1238	1.75 miles (2.82 km)	Damage limited to trees and power lines.
EF0	W of Quitman	Bienville	32.36°N 92.81°W	1303	1.1 miles (1.8 km)	Damage limited to trees.
EF2	Dodson area	Winn	32.08°N 92.66°W	1340	1.5 miles (2.4 km)	18 homes were damaged, some of them being completely destroyed. One mobile home was rolled off its foundation and destroyed, another was moved off 30 feet from its location and wrapped against the frame of another home. Two people were injured.
EF0	N of Harrisonburg	Catahoula	31.80°N 91.79°W	1351	3 miles (4.8 km)	Damage limited to trees.
Alabama
EF1	Sunshine	Hale	32.56°N 87.55°W	1832	0.05 miles (0.080 km)	Very brief tornado with roof damage to a barn and another structure. Trees were damaged.
EF0	Brook Highland	Shelby	33.44°N 86.67°W	1854	0.45 miles (0.72 km)	20 homes had roof damage and numerous trees were uprooted, primarily on the Greystone Golf Course.
EF1	Dunavant	Shelby	33.49°N 86.58°W	1903	1.64 miles (2.64 km)	Damage limited to uprooted or snapped trees.
EF1	Stewart Crossroads	St. Clair	33.54°N 86.46°W	1915	1 mile (1.6 km)	Several trees fell including some on homes causing minor to moderate damage to at least 10 houses.
EF1	Wolf Creek	St. Clair	33.51°N 86.40°W	1927	16.6 miles (26.7 km)	Many trees and power lines were knocked down. Some of them fell on houses and outbuildings.
EF1	E of Morgan City	Marshall	34.46°N 86.56°W	2040	0.25 miles (0.40 km)	Damage to multiple trees, a trailer and a shed.
EF1	NE of Owens Crossroads	Madison	34.60°N 86.42°W	2300	1.6 miles (2.6 km)	Two homes were damaged along with numerous trees.
Tennessee
EF1	SW of Crossville	Cumberland	35.91°N 85.09°W	2222	3.2 miles (5.1 km)	Numerous trees uprooted or snapped some of them causing roof damage to some homes.
Virginia
EF0	SW of Indian Valley	Floyd	36.88°N 80.57°W	2302	1 mile (1.6 km)	Damage to numerous trees and a few structures including a shed that was flattened.
North Carolina
EF0	N of Mayodan	Rockingham	36.45°N 79.97°W	0038	1.3 miles (2.1 km)	Damage to trees and three structures.
Sources: SPC Storm Reports for May 3, 2009, NWS Birmingham, NWS Blacksburg, NWS Huntsville, NWS Jackson, MS (PIS), NWS Nashville, NWS Shreveport (PIS), NWS Jackson (Storm Summary), NCDC Storm Data

=== May 3 event (Utah) ===
List of reported tornadoes - Sunday, May 3, 2009
EF#	Location	County	Coord.	Time (UTC)	Path length	Damage
Utah
EF0	Willard area	Box Elder	41.41°N 112.04°W	0150	1 mile (1.6 km)	Damage to trees and siding while a snowmobile trailer was tossed.
Sources: SPC Storm Reports for May 3, 2009, NWS Salt Lake City, NCDC Storm DAta

=== May 4 event ===
List of reported tornadoes - Monday, May 4, 2009
EF#	Location	County/Parish	Coord.	Time (UTC)	Path length	Damage
Louisiana
EF1	Catahoula	St. Martin	30.21°N 91.72°W	1059	0.5 miles (0.80 km)	A mobile home and a camper trailer were destroyed with additional damage to several residences. Three people were injured, one seriously.
Mississippi
EF1	NNE of Poplarville	Pearl River	30.94°N 89.47°W	1135	2 miles (3.2 km)	A mobile home was moved from its blocks and a church lost its steeple. Several trees and power lines were damaged.
South Carolina
EF0	SSE of Cross Hill	Laurens	34.26°N 81.98°W	2140	2 miles (3.2 km)	Several trailers were damaged and moved, and an outbuilding was destroyed.
EF0	SE of Lebanon	Fairfield	34.40°N 81.20°W	2320	2 miles (3.2 km)	A few trees and power lines were damaged.
Virginia
EF0	SW of Camden Mills	Chesapeake city	36.70°N 76.27°W	2343	3 miles (4.8 km)	Minor shingle damage to some homes and several trees being downed.
Sources:NWS Lake Charles, NWS Greenville-Spartanburg, NWS Wakefield, NCDC Storm Data

=== May 5 event ===
List of reported tornadoes - Tuesday, May 5, 2009
EF#	Location	County	Coord.	Time (UTC)	Path length	Damage
North Carolina
EF0	N of Warsaw	Duplin	35.02°N 78.02°W	1928	200 yards (180 m)	One structure sustained minor damage.
EF0	N of Kenansville	Duplin	35.00°N 77.97°W	1934	unknown	Brief tornado with no damage.
EF0	E of Strabane	Lenoir	35.20°N 77.75°W	2005	100 yards (90 m)	Three tin roofs were peeled off turkey barns.
EF0	WNW of Micro	Johnston	35.58°N 78.25°W	2025	50 yards (50 m)	Brief tornado damaged four buildings and blew a boat into a car.
EF2	S of Bailey	Wilson	35.68°N 78.10°W	2044	3 miles (4.8 km)	Significant damage to at least eight homes, of which one had its upper floor destroyed. Several carports and garages were destroyed. One person was injured.
EF0	Calico	Craven	35.40°N 77.25°W	2125	unknown	Brief tornado with no damage.
EF1	Antioch area	Johnston, Nash	35.67°N 78.27°W	2126	7 miles (11 km)	Damage to several structures including mobile homes, houses and a fire department, mostly to roofs. One mobile home was blown off its foundation. Another mobile home was moved slightly from its foundation.
EF0	NW of Shelmerdine	Pitt	35.47°N 77.27°W	2130	0.5 miles (0.80 km)	One house sustained minor damage.
Sources:NWS Newport/Morehead City, NC, NWS Raleigh, Storm Reports for May 5, 2009, NCDC Storm Data

=== May 6 event (Southeast) ===
List of reported tornadoes - Wednesday, May 6, 2009
EF#	Location	County	Coord.	Time (UTC)	Path length	Damage
Arkansas
EF0	NW of Immanuel	Arkansas	34.40°N 91.32°W	0619	4.4 miles (7.1 km)	Damage limited to a few trees.
EF1	W of Marvell	Phillips	34.55°N 90.92°W	0703	100 yards (90 m)	A supply feed store was damaged along with trees and power lines.
EF1	NW of Monticello	Drew	33.67°N 91.82°W	0952	2.1 miles (3.4 km)	Tornado embedded in a large bow echo with damage to trees and power lines.
Mississippi
EF1	E of Lyon	Coahoma	34.22°N 90.50°W	0834	100 yards (90 m)	Roof damage to one home and damage to several trees.
EF1	SE of Weir	Choctaw	33.24°N 89.22°W	1212	8.5 miles (13.7 km)	A mobile home was destroyed by a tree, hundreds of trees were uprooted, five homes had light to moderate roof damage and a church and a mobile home had roof damage.
EF1	W of Brooksville	Noxubee	33.24°N 88.75°W	1247	3.5 miles (5.6 km)	A church was moved off its blocks, several camp cabins were damaged, a tractor-trailer was overturned and several homes had roof damage from trees. Two people were injured.
Alabama
EF1	S of Pickensville	Pickens	33.18°N 88.27°W	1320	1 mile (1.6 km)	Several trees were snapped and fell with some landing on trailers.
EF1	S of Caddo	Lawrence, Morgan	34.51°N 87.13°W	1325	4 miles (6.4 km)	Significant damage occurred to a mobile home and several trees were snapped and unrooted in the Caddo area.
EF1	Carrollton area	Pickens	33.27°N 88.10°W	1331	1.35 miles (2.17 km)	Several trees were blown down damaging some homes.
EF0	Decatur area	Morgan	34.59°N 86.98°W	1342	0.75 miles (1.21 km)	Several homes and vehicles were damaged by downed trees.
EF1	Barbee Creek area	Tuscaloosa	33.47°N 87.64°W	1348	0.48 miles (0.77 km)	Two homes had moderate damage and a pontoon boat was overturned.
EF1	Lake Arnedra	Tuscaloosa	33.29°N 87.70°W	1357	0.23 miles (0.37 km)	Two trees fell on houses, causing major damage to one of them.
EF2	Madison area	Limestone, Madison	34.70°N 86.75°W	1359	10.9 miles (17.5 km)	Three residential subdivisions were hit by the tornado. Significant roof damage to several homes with others sustaining lesser damage including blown windows and minor roof damage. One large garage was flattened. Significant tree damage reported with one tree falling on a mobile home.
EF0	Jasper area	Walker	33.83°N 87.23°W	1411	3.26 miles (5.25 km)	Damage to a bank drive-thru structure as well as 40 cars at two car dealerships which were mostly destroyed by debris.
EF1	Cordova area	Walker	33.76°N 87.19°W	1420	1.03 miles (1.66 km)	15 homes and several train cars were damaged by fallen trees.
EF0	Powellville area	Walker	33.91°N 87.10°W	1424	0.25 miles (0.40 km)	A carport was destroyed, a trampoline was carried 200 yards and several trees were snapped and uprooted.
EF0	Arkadelphia area	Blount	33.90°N 86.89°W	1445	0.95 miles (1.53 km)	Brief touchdown where several trees were uprooted.
EF1	W of Warrior	Jefferson	33.82°N 86.87°W	1450	unknown	Brief tornado with significant tree damage, a few of the trees landing on houses.
Virginia
EF0	SE of Galaxa	Grayson, Carroll	36.60°N 80.87°W	0225	1.8 miles (2.9 km)	Several trees were snapped or uprooted, one of them caused slight damage to a structure.
Sources:NWS Huntsville, NWS Memphis (PIS), NWS Little Rock (PIS), NWS Birmingham (PIS), NWS Blacksburg, NWS Jackson, Storm Reports for May 5, 2009, Storm Reports for May 6, 2009, NWS Storm Data

=== May 6 event (Northwest) ===
List of reported tornadoes - Wednesday, May 6, 2009
EF#	Location	County	Coord.	Time (UTC)	Path length	Damage
Oregon
EF1	SE of Adams	Umatilla	45.73°N 118.50°W	2355	1.6 miles (2.6 km)	A workshop lost most of its metal roof. 50 gallon drums were also thrown around.
EF0	Wallowa	Wallowa	45.54°N 117.52°W	0115	unknown	Brief tornado ripped off manhole covers.
Washington
EF1	N of Davenport	Lincoln	47.77°N 118.13°W	0328	3 miles (4.8 km)	Two structures were damaged by the tornado. Many trees were also damaged.
Sources:Storm Reports for May 6, 2009, NWS Storm Data

=== May 7 event ===
List of reported tornadoes - Thursday, May 7, 2009
EF#	Location	County	Coord.	Time (UTC)	Path length	Damage
North Carolina
EF0	Vanceboro	Craven	35.30°N 77.16°W	2225	unknown	Brief tornado touchdown near West Craven High School with no damage.
EF0	SW of Vanceboro	Craven	35.30°N 77.17°W	2227	100 yards (90 m)	Second tornado in the area with minor damage to several mobile homes and houses.
EF0	SE of Midway Park	Onslow	34.71°N 77.33°W	2300	unknown	Brief tornado near the Camp Lejeune main gate with no damage.
Missouri
EF0	W of Lock Springs	Daviess	39.85°N 93.80°W	0101	unknown	Brief tornado with damage limited to trees.
Sources:NWS Kansas City, NWS Newport/Morehead City, NCDC Storm Data

=== May 8 event ===
List of reported tornadoes - Friday, May 8, 2009
EF#	Location	County	Coord.	Time (UTC)	Path length	Damage
Missouri
EF1	E of Pilgrim	Dade	37.48°N 93.37°W	1253	2 miles (3.2 km)	Intermittent tornado path with damage to trees and outbuildings.
EF1	Republic area	Greene	37.12°N 93.48°W	1305	4 miles (6.4 km)	50 structures were damaged with two buildings uninhabitable.
EF1	SE of Willard	Greene	37.26°N 93.38°W	1314	1.1 miles (1.8 km)	A few outbuildings were destroyed and one house sustained heavy damage.
EF1	NW of Brighton	Polk	37.48°N 93.37°W	1316	8.5 miles (13.7 km)	Several outbuildings and barns were damaged or destroyed with heavy damage to some frame homes.
EF0	Ebenezer area	Greene	37.33°N 93.31°W	1321	4 miles (6.4 km)	Several outbuildings were damaged, along with many trees.
EF1	E of Swan	Taney, Christian, Douglas	36.79°N 93.00°W	1325	12 miles (19 km)	Three houses was heavily damaged, along with many outbuildings by a large wedge tornado. Severe damage to trees.
EF1	E of Fordland	Webster	37.16°N 92.92°W	1338	4 miles (6.4 km)	A dairy farm lost its roof, a truck was lofted over a fence and an outbuilding was destroyed.
EF2	W of Goodhope	Douglas	36.91°N 92.84°W	1339	2.5 miles (4.0 km)	One home lost its roof and several trees were snapped with treetops carried over 1/4 mile.
EF2	N of Merritt	Douglas	36.92°N 92.87°W	1339	2.5 miles (4.0 km)	Two homes and several outbuildings were damaged with numerous trees snapped and debarked by a large wedge tornado.
EF2	W of Charity	Dallas	37.51°N 93.05°W	1341	4 miles (6.4 km)	1 death - Three frame homes and numerous outbuildings were destroyed. One other person were injured.
EF1	N of Ava	Douglas	37.00°N 92.67°W	1348	1 mile (1.6 km)	A barn was destroyed and minor home damage was reported.
EF1	SW of Wasola	Ozark	36.76°N 92.61°W	1348	2 miles (3.2 km)	Seven outbuildings were destroyed with three homes damaged as well as intense tree damage.
EF1	NW of Hartville	Wright	37.30°N 92.55°W	1407	3.5 miles (5.6 km)	Several outbuildings were destroyed and numerous trees were uprooted.
EF0	ESE of Mountain Grove	Texas	37.12°N 92.19°W	1419	3.5 miles (5.6 km)	Several outbuildings were damaged and numerous trees were uprooted.
EF2	SE of Lebanon	Laclede	37.62°N 92.59°W	1425	2.2 miles (3.5 km)	Four homes and several outbuildings were damaged, and a mobile home was destroyed.
EF3	NW of Pomona	Howell	36.88°N 91.93°W	1428	2.2 miles (3.5 km)	One house, one mobile home, one travel trailer, two outbuildings and an auto shop were destroyed. Cars were tossed 40 to 50 yards away and two school buses were blown over.
EF1	W of Peace Valley	Howell	36.89°N 91.79°W	1435	11 miles (18 km)	A few homes and numerous trees were damaged.
EF2	W of Mountain View to SE of Summersville	Howell, Texas, Shannon	37.00°N 91.85°W	1435	28 miles (45 km)	A farm house was lifted and moved injuring two people. Two auto shops and several homes and outbuildings were damaged or destroyed. Many trees were snapped or uprooted with $13 million in tree damage.
EF1	ESE of Hazelton	Texas	37.50°N 91.95°W	1440	3.5 miles (5.6 km)	One barn was destroyed and one mobile home lost its roof.
EF1	N of Ellington	Reynolds	37.31°N 90.99°W	1515	2 miles (3.2 km)	2 homes had roof damage with significant tree damage.
EF0	McBride area	Perry	37.82°N 89.84°W	1620	2.2 miles (3.5 km)	Damage limited to trees. Tornado caught on tape.
EF0	N of Fredericktown	Madison	37.61°N 90.26°W	1705	0.5 miles (0.80 km)	Brief tornado damaged a few trees.
EF1	W of Cornwall	Madison	37.52°N 90.22°W	1710	0.5 miles (0.80 km)	Brief tornado damaged a few trees.
Illinois
EF1	WSW of Du Quoin	Jackson	37.95°N 89.40°W	1630	3 miles (4.8 km)	Structural damage to two barns, shingle damage to homes, power poles blown over and dozens of trees snapped or uprooted.
EF0	SSW of Raddle	Jackson	37.83°N 89.21°W	1651	unknown	Brief tornado remained in open fields.
EF0	S of Elkville	Jackson	37.75°N 89.58°W	1812	unknown	An office trailer at a coal company was blown off its foundation.
EF0	N of Royalton	Franklin	37.89°N 89.11°W	1818	unknown	Brief tornado touchdown that was photographed with no damage.
EF1	N of Thompsonville	Franklin, Williamson	37.89°N 88.74°W	1945	5 miles (8.0 km)	Damage to many trees in rural areas.
EF0	N of Little York	Warren	41.05°N 90.75°W	0114	unknown	Brief tornado separate from the main derecho with no damage.
Iowa
EF0	NE of Gillett Grove	Clay	43.05°N 94.97°W	1840	unknown	Brief tornado remained in a plowed field.
Kentucky
EF1	E of Hiseville	Barren, Metcalfe	37.11°N 85.80°W	2004	6 miles (9.7 km)	Three outbuildings were destroyed and one home and a pole barn were damaged.
EF3	Richmond area	Garrard, Madison	37.68°N 84.37°W	2055	22 miles (35 km)	2 deaths - Severe damage along the path with over 150 houses damaged, some of which were destroyed. The two fatalities took place in a mobile home which was thrown into a nearby pond. The Bluegrass Army Depot was also damaged. 15 others were injured, some seriously.
EF0	NW of Irvine	Estill	37.75°N 84.04°W	2118	0.25 miles (0.40 km)	Two structures had metal roofing torn off. Several trees were knocked down including one that damaged the porch of a home.
Tennessee
EF0	NW of Etowah	McMinn	35.35°N 84.53°W	2102	0.1 miles (0.16 km)	Brief tornado with damage to several trees.
EF1	SE of Jamestown	Fentress	36.40°N 84.90°W	2115	3 miles (4.8 km)	One mobile home was destroyed and several other buildings were damaged, some of which were by falling trees.
EF2	SE of Huntsville	Scott	36.35°N 84.42°W	2158	4.5 miles (7.2 km)	Seven homes were damaged and a free standing cellphone tower collapsed and was twisted by the tornado.
EF2	SW of Tazewell	Claiborne	36.45°N 83.57°W	2315	2.2 miles (3.5 km)	Two large barns were destroyed and one home lost its roof.
EF1	NE of Thorn Hill	Grainger, Hancock	36.40°N 83.34°W	2336	3.5 miles (5.6 km)	Heavy damage to barns and outbuildings with roof damage to homes and numerous downed trees.
EF0	S of Gray	Washington	36.40°N 82.48°W	0045	unknown	Tornado touchdown reported/confirmed by law enforcement. No damage reported.
Virginia
EF0	N of Clintwood	Dickenson	37.18°N 82.46°W	0100	0.75 miles (1.21 km)	Trees were uprooted, one of them fell on a mobile home. Minor roof damage to two homes.
EF2	SE of Pound	Wise	37.07°N 82.55°W	0145	1.7 miles (2.7 km)	Two trailers and several outbuildings were destroyed. A third trailer was damaged.
EF0	NW of Lebanon	Russell	36.90°N 82.08°W	0225	0.1 miles (0.16 km)	Brief tornado with no damage.
EF2	NE of Lebanon	Russell	36.93°N 81.95°W	0227	1.1 miles (1.8 km)	One barn was destroyed, one home had moderate damage and 100 trees were snapped or uprooted.
North Carolina
EF2	NW of Ennice	Alleghany	36.56°N 81.03°W	0344	5 miles (8.0 km)	A mobile home was destroyed where four people were injured. Five houses and several outbuildings were damaged and cement silos were toppled. There were two additional injuries.
EF1	SW of Ennice	Alleghany	36.55°N 81.00°W	0346	0.25 miles (0.40 km)	Three outbuildings were destroyed and one home and a pole barn were damaged.
Sources:NWS Springfield (Summary), NWS Springfield, NWS Louisville #1, NWS Louisville #2, NWS Blacksburg, NWS Paducah, NWS St. Louis, NWS Morristown, NWS Charleston, WV (PIS), NWS Jackson, KY, Storm Reports for May 8, 2009, NCDC Storm Data

=== May 9 event ===
List of reported tornadoes - Saturday, May 9, 2009
EF#	Location	County	Coord.	Time (UTC)	Path length	Damage
Arkansas
EF0	E of Ashdown	Little River	33.68°N 94.10°W	1910	2.4 miles (3.9 km)	Trees were snapped or uprooted.
EF0	ENE of McNab	Hempstead	33.69°N 93.75°W	1930	5.8 miles (9.3 km)	Trees were snapped or uprooted.
Vermont
EF1	Washington area	Orange	44.11°N 72.43°W	2104	0.5 miles (0.80 km)	A barn was destroyed and the roof of an apartment was removed. Trees were snapped and uprooted. Second earliest tornado in Vermont since 1950.
Massachusetts
EF0	Sunderland area	Franklin	42.47°N 72.58°W	2305	0.75 miles (1.21 km)	A tobacco barn was blown onto a road and there was tree damage.
Sources: NWS Burlington, VT (PIS), NWS Boston, Storm Reports for May 9, 2009, NCDC Storm Data

=== May 10 event ===
List of reported tornadoes - Sunday, May 10, 2009
EF#	Location	County/Parish	Coord.	Time (UTC)	Path length	Damage
Louisiana
EF0	WNW of Goldonna	Natchitoches	32.04°N 92.95°W	2044	2.2 miles (3.5 km)	Several trees were uprooted.
Mississippi
EF1	SW of Holly Bluff	Sharkey	32.74°N 90.81°W	2240	3 miles (4.8 km)	Hardwood and softwood trees were snapped or uprooted.
Sources: NWS Jackson, MS, Storm Reports for May 10, 2009, NCDC Storm Data

=== May 12 event ===
List of reported tornadoes - Tuesday, May 12, 2009
EF#	Location	County	Coord.	Time (UTC)	Path length	Damage
Florida
EF0	Lakeland	Polk	28.07°N 81.90°W	2100	80 yards (70 m)	Damage to trees and a carport though debris caused window and fence damage.
South Dakota
EF0	W of Red Elm	Ziebach	45.07°N 101.92°W	2328	unknown	Tornado photographed with no damage.
EF1	N of Dupree	Ziebach	45.05°N 101.69°W	2340	8 miles (13 km)	Several mobile homes, barns and grain bins were damaged and a communications tower was toppled.
Nebraska
EF0	S of Mullen	Hooker	41.82°N 101.18°W	0021	4 miles (6.4 km)	Damage to a wind mill, outbuilding, radio tower, a metal windbreak and a pick-up
Sources: NWS North Platte, NWS Tampa, NWS Rapid City, NCDC Storm Data

=== May 13 event (Midwest) ===
List of reported tornadoes - Wednesday, May 13, 2009
EF#	Location	County	Coord.	Time (UTC)	Path length	Damage
Missouri
EF1	N of Milan	Sullivan	40.21°N 93.10°W	2210	4 miles (6.4 km)	1 death - A mobile home was destroyed, killing its occupant.
EF1	Novinger area	Adair	40.23°N 92.71°W	2243	8 miles (13 km)	A mobile home and an outbuilding were destroyed. Additional damage to one home and other buildings as well as several power lines/poles and trees.
EF2	Kirksville area	Adair	40.21°N 92.58°W	2309	6 miles (9.7 km)	2 deaths - Over 200 buildings were damaged in the northern part of Kirksville, including 10 houses that were destroyed by the tornado and 15 others that sustained severe damage. Two car dealerships were also heavily damaged. Six others were injured.
EF0	NE of Kenwood	Knox	40.20°N 92.17°W	2333	9.5 miles (15.3 km)	Several outbuildings were damaged, seven power poles were snapped and heavy tree damage.
EF0	N of Knox City	Knox	40.18°N 92.04°W	2349	3.8 miles (6.1 km)	Two outbuildings were heavily damaged.
EF1	Bismarck area	Saint Francois	37.76°N 90.62°W	0611	1 mile (1.6 km)	Roof torn off of a preschool building. Additional minor roof damage.
Kansas
EF0	NE of Burlington	Coffey	38.28°N 95.62°W	2252	unknown	Brief touchdown in an open field with no damage.
EF0	SW of Harris	Coffey	38.26°N 95.52°W	2300	unknown	Brief touchdown in an open field with no damage.
EF0	SE of Cambridge	Cowley	37.30°N 96.63°W	2355	1 mile (1.6 km)	Tornado remained in open country.
EF1	N of Redfield	Bourbon	37.95°N 95.07°W	0020	8 miles (13 km)	Intermittent path with damage to five hay barns, several outbuildings and numerous trees.
EF0	S of Chetopa	Labette	37.00°N 95.07°W	0249	unknown	Brief touchdown in an open field with no damage.
Oklahoma
EF0	S of Nardin	Kay	36.67°N 94.45°W	2354	unknown	Captured live on KFOR-TV live stream. The storm remained stationary over open land. No damage to structures.
EF1	S of Billings	Noble	36.50°N 97.44°W	0020	5 miles (8.0 km)	Damage to trees and power lines.
EF2	SE of Gracemont	Caddo	35.07°N 98.24°W	0226	7 miles (11 km)	Numerous houses and businesses sustained damage, some of which was severe. A strip plaza was also damaged.
EF0	Lake Stanley Draper	Cleveland	35.36°N 97.39°W	0341	unknown	A boat dock and several structures were damaged.
Illinois
EF1	W of Pana	Christian	39.39°N 89.15°W	0504	0.75 miles (1.21 km)	A pole barn was heavily damaged. Damage to a house and a barn.
EF0	S of Tower Hill	Shelby	39.36°N 88.96°W	0512	0.5 miles (0.80 km)	Minor damage to roofs of homes with some porches blown off. Heavy damage to a shed.
EF0	SW of Shelbyville	Shelby	39.39°N 88.79°W	0522	1.25 miles (2.01 km)	Two sheds and a carport were destroyed. Porches were torn off of homes.
EF0	SE of Homer	Vermilion	40.01°N 87.92°W	0523	100 yards (90 m)	A machinery shed was destroyed with damage to two others. Transmission power poles were snapped.
EF0	Gillespie area	Macoupin	39.11°N 89.84°W	0538	2 miles (3.2 km)	Several homes and outbuildings and a high school were damaged.
Sources: 05/13/09 Storm reports, NWS Norman, OK, NWS Topeka, NWS Kansas City, NWS Lincoln, IL, NWS St. Louis, NWS Springfield, NCDC Storm Data

=== May 13 event (Florida) ===
List of reported tornadoes - Wednesday, May 13, 2009
EF#	Location	County	Coord.	Time (UTC)	Path length	Damage
Florida
EF0	Temple Terrace area	Hillsborough	28.02°N 82.35°W	2333	1 mile (1.6 km)	Several trees were downed including one on a home. Shutters were ripped off the front of a home.
Sources: NWS Tampa, NCDC Storm Data

=== May 14 event ===
List of reported tornadoes - Thursday, May 14, 2009
EF#	Location	County	Coord.	Time (UTC)	Path length	Damage
Texas
EF0	SSW of Idabel	Red River	33.77°N 94.91°W	0815	1 mile (1.6 km)	Metal roofing removed from a barn.
EF0	NW of New Boston	Bowie	33.58°N 94.57°W	0858	0.75 miles (1.21 km)	Damage to several trees.
Indiana
EF2	E of Haubstatdt	Gibson	38.20°N 87.57°W	0825	10.5 miles (16.9 km)	Significant damage at the Haubstadt raceway with a grain bin silo destroyed, roof damage to several machinery buildings and one car frame being moved 100 feet. One barn and several homes had roof damage.
Arkansas
EF0	SE of Ashdown	Little River	33.63°N 94.08°W	0920	2 miles (3.2 km)	Damage to several trees.
Louisiana
EF0	SSW of Denge	Calcasieu	30.16°N 93.32°W	1545	unknown	Brief tornado reported by the public with no damage.
Sources: NWS Paducah, Storm Reports for May 13, 2009, Storm Data

=== May 15 event ===
List of reported tornadoes - Friday, May 15, 2009
EF#	Location	County	Coord.	Time (UTC)	Path length	Damage
Texas
EF0	W of Miami	Roberts	35.70°N 100.85°W	2145	0.25 miles (0.40 km)	Tornado remained in open country with no damage reported.
EF0	WSW of Miami	Roberts	35.62°N 100.85°W	2147	0.5 miles (0.80 km)	Tornado remained in open country with no damage reported.
EF0	NE of Pampa	Gray	35.57°N 100.91°W	2202	1 mile (1.6 km)	Tornado remained in open country with no damage reported.
EF2	E of Pampa	Gray	35.54°N 100.89°W	2209	3 miles (4.8 km)	Large multiple-vortex tornado severely damaged a house, a semi-trailer and a mobile home. The driver of the semi-trailer was injured.
EF1	Lefors area	Gray	35.45°N 100.86°W	2225	6 miles (9.7 km)	Several houses and other structures sustained damage, and widespread tree damage was reported in the community.
Missouri
EF0	SW of Paris	Monroe	39.40°N 92.07°W	2147	120 yards (110 m)	Brief tornado touchdown in an open field.
EF0	W of Santa Fe	Monroe	39.40°N 91.91°W	2200	0.25 miles (0.40 km)	One power pole was bent and a few trees were damaged.
Kansas
EF0	SE of Cheney	Reno	37.75°N 97.79°W	2157	1 mile (1.6 km)	Tornado touched down over Cheney Lake.
EF0	WSW of Goddard	Sedgwick	37.65°N 97.60°W	2231	unknown	Brief tornado touchdown with no damage.
EF0	SW of Norwich	Kingman	37.42°N 97.90°W	2258	2 miles (3.2 km)	Tornado remained in an open field.
EF0	SE of Conway Springs	Sumner	37.35°N 97.60°W	2325	unknown	Brief tornado touchdown with no damage.
Sources: NWS Amarillo, NWS St. Louis (PIS), Storm Reports for May 15, 2009, NCDC Storm Data

=== May 16 event ===
List of reported tornadoes - Saturday, May 16, 2009
EF#	Location	County	Coord.	Time (UTC)	Path length	Damage
New York
EF0	Cuyler	Cortland	42.72°N 75.90°W	2024	0.4 miles (0.64 km)	Brief tornado uprooted trees and damaged two sheds.
EF2	Georgetown area	Madison	42.75°N 75.77°W	2034	6.5 miles (10.5 km)	Several farms were heavily damaged, including barns, sheds and outbuildings destroyed and at least two houses were damaged. One person was injured.
EF0	N of Waverly	Tioga	42.07°N 76.30°W	2100	0.25 miles (0.40 km)	Brief tornado reported with minimal damage.
Louisiana
EF0	Metairie	Jefferson	30.01°N 90.18°W	0220	0.75 miles (1.21 km)	Waterspout over Lake Pontchartrain moved onshore with intermittent damage to a few homes and businesses as well as several trees and fences.
Sources: NWS Binghamton, Storm Reports for May 16, 2009, NWS New Orleans, NCDC Storm Data

=== May 19 event (Colorado) ===
List of reported tornadoes - Tuesday, May 19, 2009
EF#	Location	County	Coord.	Time (UTC)	Path length	Damage
Colorado
EF0	N of Cameo	Mesa	39.18°N 108.32°W	2122	unknown	Brief tornado remained on plateaus near Mount Garfield.
Sources: NCDC Storm Data

=== May 19 event (Florida) ===
List of reported tornadoes - Tuesday, May 19, 2009
EF#	Location	County	Coord.	Time (UTC)	Path length	Damage
Florida
EF0	ESE of Casselberry	Seminole	28.66°N 81.32°W	0342	1.5 miles (2.4 km)	see section of this tornado
Sources: Storm Reports for May 19, 2009, NCDC Storm Data

=== May 22 event (Florida) ===
List of reported tornadoes - Friday, May 22, 2009
EF#	Location	County	Coord.	Time (UTC)	Path length	Damage
Florida
EF0	Clearwater	Pinellas	27.96°N 82.79°W	1645	1 mile (1.6 km)	see section of this tornado.
Sources: NCDC Storm Data

=== May 22 event (Arizona) ===
List of reported tornadoes - Friday, May 22, 2009
EF#	Location	County	Coord.	Time (UTC)	Path length	Damage
Arizona
EF0	NNW of Cosnino	Coconino	35.27°N 111.52°W	1922	1 mile (1.6 km)	Brief narrow tornado reported by the sheriff office.
EF0	S of Sunset Crater	Coconino	35.27°N 111.50°W	2100	1 mile (1.6 km)	Brief narrow tornado reported by the public.
EF0	NE of Rice	Apache	35.06°N 111.52°W	2130	1 mile (1.6 km)	Tornado sighted over the Petrified Forest National Park by visitors.
Sources: NCDC Storm Data

=== May 23 event ===
List of reported tornadoes - Saturday, May 23, 2009
EF#	Location	County	Coord.	Time (UTC)	Path length	Damage
Alabama
EF0	ESE of Mountain Creek	Autauga	32.70°N 86.43°W	1855	0.33 miles (0.53 km)	Several hardwood/softwood trees uprooted. One outbuilding had roof damage.
EF0	WNW of Bartletts Ferry	Lee	32.67°N 85.14°W	2159	1 mile (1.6 km)	Damage to several outbuildings and 150 trees.
Nebraska
EF0	E of Maxwell	Lincoln	41.07°N 100.48°W	2027	unknown	Brief landspout tornado with no damage.
Sources: Storm Reports for May 23, 2009, NCDC Storm Data

=== May 24 event (Northeast) ===
List of reported tornadoes - Sunday, May 24, 2009
EF#	Location	County	Coord.	Time (UTC)	Path length	Damage
Maine
EF1	NE of Eagle Lake	Aroostook	47.07°N 68.54°W	1815	3.1 miles (5.0 km)	Several homes and vehicles with damage with one home having moderate damage. One building was destroyed and hundreds of trees were damaged.
Sources: Storm Reports for May 24, 2009, NWS Caribou, NCDC Storm Data

=== May 24 event (South/Southwest) ===
List of reported tornadoes - Sunday, May 24, 2009
EF#	Location	County	Coord.	Time (UTC)	Path length	Damage
Utah
EF0	W of Milford	Beaver	38.39°N 113.10°W	1830	unknown	Brief tornado with no damage.
Texas
EF0	ENE of Petersburg	Hale	33.87°N 101.37°W	1928	unknown	Brief tornado with no damage.
EF1	NNE of Ben Bolt	Jim Wells	27.67°N 98.06°W	2012	0.2 miles (0.32 km)	A mobile home was destroyed and another lost its roof. Several trees were also damaged.
EF0	N of Dougherty	Floyd	34.05°N 101.07°W	1928	unknown	Brief tornado with no damage.
Colorado
EF0	W of Adams City	Adams	39.82°N 104.90°W	2012	unknown	Brief tornado with no damage.
EF0	NW of Acequia	Douglas	39.52°N 105.01°W	2142	unknown	Brief tornado hit a picnic table at a sheriff training facility.
Tennessee
EF0	E of Midway	Dyer, Pemiscot (MO)	36.05°N 89.67°W	2225	5 miles (8.0 km)	Tornado crossed the Mississippi River but caused no damage.
Sources: NWS Salt Lake City, NCDC Storm Data

=== May 25 event ===
List of reported tornadoes - Monday, May 25, 2009
EF#	Location	County	Coord.	Time (UTC)	Path length	Damage
Colorado
EF0	N of Stratton	Kit Carson	39.33°N 102.60°W	1820	unknown	Brief tornado reported by law enforcement with no damage.
Kansas
EF0	NW of Horace	Greeley	38.60°N 101.92°W	1945	unknown	Brief tornado reported by law enforcement with no damage.
Sources: NCDC Storm Data

=== May 27 event ===
List of reported tornadoes - Wednesday, May 27, 2009
EF#	Location	County	Coord.	Time (UTC)	Path length	Damage
Ohio
EF0	N of Neptune	Mercer	40.62°N 84.46°W	2110	1 mile (1.6 km)	Brief tornado remained in a field.
Sources: NCDC Storm Data

=== May 30 event ===
List of reported tornadoes - Saturday, May 30, 2009
EF#	Location	County	Coord.	Time (UTC)	Path length	Damage
Ohio
EF0	Bethel	Clermont	38.96°N 84.08°W	0044	0.5 miles (0.80 km)	Tornado confirmed by videotape but no damage reported.
EF0	S of Wilmington	Clinton	38.96°N 84.08°W	0048	0.35 miles (0.56 km)	Tornado sighted at the NWS Wilmington office but no damage reported.
EF0	SE of Wilmington	Clinton	39.40°N 83.79°W	0050	125 yards (110 m)	Second tornado touchdown later confirmed in the Wilmington area. The roof of a barn was partially destroyed with metal siding blown off and walls of the structure being damaged. A shed was blown off its foundation and trees were uprooted
Sources: NWS Wilmington OH, NCDC Storm Data

=== May 31 event ===
List of reported tornadoes - Sunday, May 31, 2009
EF#	Location	County	Coord.	Time (UTC)	Path length	Damage
Maine
EF0	SE of Oxbow	Aroostook	46.35°N 68.36°W	2100	1 mile (1.6 km)	Dozens of trees were sheared off.
EF0	Westfield to Easton	Aroostook	46.54°N 68.01°W	2129	13.1 miles (21.1 km)	Outbuildings were destroyed and hundreds of trees were sheared off or uprooted. The roof of a dairy barn was destroyed.
Sources: NWS Caribou, ME, NCDC Storm Data

== See also ==
- Tornadoes of 2009
- List of United States tornadoes in April 2009
- List of United States tornadoes in June 2009
