= Severe weather sequence of May 2–8, 2009 =

Unusually strong sequence of derecho events and tornadoes

The severe weather sequence of May 2–8, 2009 was an unusually strong sequence of tornadoes and derecho events beginning on May 2, 2009, and continuing through May 8, which primarily affected the Southern United States. At least seven people were killed by the storms. An associated tornado outbreak also resulted in nearly 100 tornadoes, some strong, with most strong tornadoes, most damage, and all of the deaths on May 8. In total, nine people were killed, dozens were injured and at least $70 million in damage occurred, $58 million on May 8.

== May 3: Deep South derecho ==
On May 3, a moderate risk of severe weather was issued for parts of Mississippi, Alabama, and Georgia, mainly for a threat of intense downburst winds. A major progressive derecho with widespread and extensive wind damage - as strong as 110 mph (175 km/h) at times - and embedded tornadoes was confirmed to have traveled from East Texas all the way to Alabama with numerous reports of damage all across Louisiana, Mississippi and Alabama and into northern Georgia. At least one person was killed when a tree fell on her mobile home. A number of "large and extremely dangerous" tornadoes were reported in Alabama in the afternoon of May 3 by Storm Spotters and the NWS. Significant damage was reported near Moody, Pell City and Ragland in Blount and St. Clair Counties from this tornado according to ABC 33/40 coverage while tornadoes were reported in southern Jefferson County and northern Shelby County. Another reported tornado in Crossville, Tennessee resulted in significant damage and injuries.

== May 8: Plains to Ohio Valley derecho ==
Another major severe weather event developed early on May 8 over southwestern Kansas. It quickly formed into a major progressive derecho which tracked across the central Plains, the Ozarks and into the Ohio Valley. Several tornadoes also developed, primarily in the Springfield, Missouri area where damage was reported. A moderate risk of severe weather was issued primarily due to the wind threat. That was preceded by two PDS severe thunderstorm watches (a rare issuance) issued early that morning, and a tornado watch later in the morning mentioning winds of 105 miles per hour (169 km/h) possible. Two people were killed near Poplar Bluff, Missouri when winds knocked a tree into their car. Another Missouri resident suffered a fatal heart attack after he was blown away from his home and thrown into a building. A woman was killed in southeastern Kansas after her mobile home was blown off its foundation. Eventually, the storm developed a tropical cyclone-like structure (a mesolow), with a well-defined eye feature. In addition, winds were measured as high as 106 miles per hour (171 km/h) in Carbondale, Illinois. Another death occurred in Dallas County, Missouri from an EF2 tornado, as well as two others from an EF3 tornado in Kirksville, Kentucky. Dr. Joe Schaefer, director of the National Oceanic and Atmospheric Administration's Storm Prediction Center, commented that the "derecho complex is one of the worst I've seen in the past decade".

== Other severe weather ==
On May 2, an EF0 tornado hit Eggville, Mississippi where damage was reported as a slow-moving front continued southward. In Valley Ranch, Texas, the practice facility for the Dallas Cowboys was destroyed by a microburst, injuring 12 people.

== Tornadoes ==
Confirmed tornadoes by Enhanced Fujita rating
EFU	EF0	EF1	EF2	EF3	EF4	EF5	Total
0	35	45	14	2	0	0	96

=== May 2 event ===
List of reported tornadoes - Saturday, May 2, 2009
EF#	Location	County	Coord.	Time (UTC)	Path length	Damage
Mississippi
EF0	Eggville area	Lee	34.34°N 88.57°W	1850	unknown	Power lines and trees knocked down.
EF0	Mantachie area	Itawamba	34.32°N 88.49°W	1900	unknown	One shed demolished, numerous trees broken
EF0	Fairview area	Itawamba	34.37°N 88.32°W	1922	unknown	Damage limited to trees
Texas
EF0	SW of DeKalb	Bowie	33.51°N 94.62°W	2144	1 mile (1.6 km)	Damage limited to trees
EF1	N of Douglassville	Cass	33.19°N 94.35°W	2251	2 miles (3.2 km)	Numerous trees snapped or uprooted with minor shingle damage to some homes.
EF0	SE of Leesburg	Camp	33.00°N 94.97°W	0156	2 miles (3.2 km)	Damage limited to trees that are snapped or uprooted
Alabama
EF0	Luxapallila	Fayette	33.72°N 87.88°W	2220	0.1 miles (0.16 km)	Brief tornado touchdown in a wooded area
EF0	Hightogy	Lamar	33.67°N 88.09°W	2227	2.5 miles (4.0 km)	Damage limited to trees
Arkansas
EF1	NW of Fouke	Miller	33.26°N 93.89°W	2313	3.75 miles (6.04 km)	Damage mostly to trees and power lines though a porch was blown off a home. There were 3 people injured.
Sources: SPC Storm Reports for May 2, 2009, NWS Shreveport (PIS), NWS Memphis, NWS Birmingham (PIS)

=== May 3 event ===
List of reported tornadoes - Sunday, May 3, 2009
EF#	Location	County/Parish	Coord.	Time (UTC)	Path length	Damage
Louisiana
EF0	SE of Castor	Bienville	32.22°N 93.13°W	1238	1.75 miles (2.82 km)	Damage limited to trees and power lines
EF0	W of Quitman	Bienville	32.36°N 92.81°W	1303	1.1 miles (1.8 km)	Damage limited to trees
EF2	Dodson area	Winn	32.08°N 92.66°W	1340	1.5 miles (2.4 km)	18 homes were damaged, some of them being destroyed. One mobile home was rolled off its foundation and destroyed, another was moved off 30 feet from its location and wrapped against the frame of another home. Two people were injured.
EF0	N of Harrisonburg	Catahoula	31.80°N 91.79°W	1351	3 miles (4.8 km)	Damage limited to trees
Mississippi
EF0	SW of Thomastown	Madison, Leake		1200	4 miles (6.4 km)	Damage limited to trees
EF1	SW of Port Gibson	Claiborne	31.89°N 91.06°W	1455	4.4 miles (7.1 km)	Damage limited to trees
EF1	N of Clem	Simpson, Jefferson Davis	31.75°N 89.79°W	1607	10 miles (16 km)	A travel trailer was destroyed while three chicken houses, a mobile home and a church were damaged. Trees were also uprooted or snapped
EF1	S of Mount Olive	Covington, Smith	31.69°N 89.66°W	1612	18 miles (29 km)	Damage to numerous trees, street signs and one house.
EF1	E of Taylorsville	Smith, Jasper	31.83°N 89.36°W	1637	5.2 miles (8.4 km)	One chicken house was destroyed, a second one damaged. A mobile and a shed had roof damaged and multiple trees were damaged.
EF1	NE of Stringer	Jasper	31.90°N 89.23°W	1641	0.6 miles (0.97 km)	Large pines were uprooted and snapped
Alabama
EF1	Sunshine	Hale	32.56°N 87.55°W	1832	0.05 miles (0.080 km)	Brief tornado with roof damage to a barn and another structure. Trees were damaged.
EF0	Brook Highland	Shelby	33.44°N 86.67°W	1853	0.45 miles (0.72 km)	20 homes had roof damage and numerous trees were uprooted
EF1	Dunavant	Shelby	33.49°N 86.58°W	1903	1.64 miles (2.64 km)	Damage limited to uprooted or snapped trees
EF1	Wolf Creek	St. Clair	33.51°N 86.40°W	1927	16.58 miles (26.68 km)	Damage limited to trees and power poles though some fell on structures
EF1	Stewart Crossroads	St. Clair	33.54°N 86.46°W	2015	1 mile (1.6 km)	Several trees fell including some on homes causing minor to moderate damage
EF1	E of Morgan City	Marshall	34.46°N 86.56°W	2040	0.25 miles (0.40 km)	Damage to multiple trees and a shed
EF1	NE of Owens Crossroads	Madison		2300	1.64 miles (2.64 km)	Two homes were damaged along with numerous trees.
Tennessee
EF1	SW of Crossville	Cumberland	35.91°N 85.09°W	2220	3.2 miles (5.1 km)	Numerous trees uprooted or snapped some of them causing roof damage to some homes
Virginia
EF0	SW of Indian Valley	Floyd	36.88°N 80.57°W	2302	1.07 miles (1.72 km)	Damage to numerous trees and a few structures including a shed that was flattened.
North Carolina
EF0	N of Mayodan	Rockingham		0038	1.3 miles (2.1 km)	Damage to trees and three structures
Sources: SPC Storm Reports for May 3, 2009, NWS Birmingham, NWS Blacksburg, NWS Huntsville, NWS Jackson, MS (PIS), NWS Nashville, NWS Shreveport (PIS), NWS Jackson (Storm Summary)

=== May 4 event ===
List of reported tornadoes - Monday, May 4, 2009
EF#	Location	County/Parish	Coord.	Time (UTC)	Path length	Damage
Louisiana
EF1	Catahoula	St. Martin	30.21°N 91.72°W	1100	0.5 miles (0.80 km)	A mobile home and camper trailer were destroyed with additional damage to several residences. One person was injured.
South Carolina
EF0	SSE of Cross Hill	Laurens	34.26°N 81.98°W	2140	2 miles (3.2 km)	Several trailers were damaged and moved, and an outbuilding was destroyed.
Virginia
EF0	Chesapeake area	Chesapeake		2343	3 miles (4.8 km)	Minor shingle damage to some homes and several trees being downed
Sources:NWS Lake Charles, NWS Greenville-Spartanburg, NWS Wakefield

=== May 5 event ===
List of reported tornadoes - Tuesday, May 5, 2009
EF#	Location	County	Coord.	Time (UTC)	Path length	Damage
North Carolina
EF0	N of Warsaw	Duplin		1930	200 yards (180 m)	Three turkey barns were damaged, one of them being destroyed
EF0	Moss Hill area	Lenoir		2005	50 yards (50 m)	Three tin roofs were peeled off turkey barns.
EF2	S of Bailey	Johnson, Wilson		2025	12 miles (19 km)	Significant damage to several homes. One building was destroyed. One person was injured.
EF1	Chicod area	Pitt		2130	0.5 miles (0.80 km)	Several outbuildings were heavily damaged and an automobile was thrown.
EF1	Antioch area	Johnston, Nash		2230	7 miles (11 km)	Damage to several structures including mobile homes, houses and a fire department, mostly to roofs. One mobile home was blown off its foundation injuring one person. Another mobile was moved slightly from its foundation.
Sources:NWS Newport/Morehead City, NC, NWS Raleigh, Storm Reports for May 5, 2009

=== May 6 event ===
List of reported tornadoes - Wednesday, May 6, 2009
EF#	Location	County	Coord.	Time (UTC)	Path length	Damage
Arkansas
EF1	W of Marvell	Phillips		0703	100 yards (90 m)	A supply feed store was damaged along with trees and power lines
EF1	NW of Monticello	Drew	33.67°N 91.79°W	1000	2.1 miles (3.4 km)	
EF0	NW of Immanuel	Arkansas		unknown	4.4 miles (7.1 km)	Damage limited to trees
Mississippi
EF1	Lyon area	Coahoma		0834	100 yards (90 m)	Roof damage to one home and damage to several trees
EF1	SE of Weir	Choctaw		1212	8.5 miles (13.7 km)	A mobile home was destroyed by a tree, hundreds of trees were uprooted, five homes had light to moderate roof damage and a church and a mobile home had roof damage
EF1	W of Brooksville	Noxubee		1243	3.5 miles (5.6 km)	A church was moved off its blocks, several camp cabins were damaged, a tractor-trailer was overturned and several homes had roof damage from trees.
Alabama
EF1	Rogersville Camp area	Pickens	33.18°N 88.27°W	1320	1 mile (1.6 km)	Several trees were snapped and fell with some landing on trailers.
EF1	Carrollton area	Pickens	33.27°N 88.10°W	1331	1.35 miles (2.17 km)	Several trees were blown down damaging some homes
EF1	S of Caddo	Lawrence, Morgan	34.51°N 87.13°W	1325	4.0 miles (6.4 km)	Significant damage occurred to a mobile home and several trees were snapped and unrooted in the Caddo area.
EF0	Decatur area	Morgan	34.59°N 86.98°W	1343	0.75 miles (1.21 km)	Several homes and vehicles were damaged by downed trees.
EF1	Barbee Creek area	Tuscaloosa	33.47°N 87.64°W	1348	0.48 miles (0.77 km)	Two homes had moderate damage and a pontoon boat was overturned.
EF1	Lake Arnedra area	Tuscaloosa	33.29°N 87.70°W	1357	0.23 miles (0.37 km)	Two trees fell on houses, causing major damage to one of them.
EF2	Madison area	Limestone, Madison	34.70°N 86.75°W	1403	10.9 miles (17.5 km)	Three residential subdivisions were hit by the tornado. Significant roof damage to several homes with others sustaining lesser damage including blown windows and minor roof damage. One large garage was flattened. Significant tree damage reported with one tree falling on a mobile home.
EF0	Jasper area	Walker	33.83°N 87.23°W	1411	3.26 miles (5.25 km)	Damage to a bank drive-through and ATM area as well as 40 cars at two car dealerships
EF1	Cordova area	Walker	33.76°N 87.19°W	1420	1.03 miles (1.66 km)	15 homes and train cars were damaged by fallen trees.
EF0	Powellville area	Walker	33.91°N 87.10°W	1420	0.25 miles (0.40 km)	A carport was destroyed, a trampoline was carried 200 yards and several trees were snapped and uprooted.
EF0	Arkadelphia area	Blount	33.90°N 86.89°W	1445	0.95 miles (1.53 km)	Brief touchdown where several trees were uprooted.
Virginia
EF0	SE of Galaxa	Grayson, Carroll		0225	1.8 miles (2.9 km)	Several trees were snapped or uprooted, one of them caused slight damage to a structure.
Sources:NWS Huntsville, NWS Memphis (PIS), NWS Little Rock (PIS), NWS Birmingham (PIS), NWS Blacksburg, VA, NWS Jackson, Storm Reports for May 5, 2009, Storm Reports for May 6, 2009

=== May 7 event ===
List of reported tornadoes - Thursday, May 7, 2009
EF#	Location	County	Coord.	Time (UTC)	Path length	Damage
North Carolina
EF0	SW of Vanceboro	Craven		2230	100 yards (90 m)	Minor damage to several mobile homes and houses
Missouri
EF0	W of Lock Springs	Daviess		0100	unknown	Damage limited to trees
Sources:NWS Kansas City, NWS Newport/Morehead City

=== May 8 event ===
List of reported tornadoes - Friday, May 8, 2009
EF#	Location	County	Coord.	Time (UTC)	Path length	Summary
Missouri
EF1	E of Pilgrim	Dade	37°22′N 93°45′W	1253	2 miles (3.2 km)	Brief tornado damaged several trees and outbuildings along an intermittent path.
EF1	Republic area	Greene	37°06′N 93°30′W	1305	4 miles (6.4 km)	Short-lived tornado tracked through downtown Republic, damaging about 50 structures. Losses from the storm reached $1 million.
EF1	NW of Springfield-Branson National Airport	Greene	37°15′N 93°23′W	1314	2 miles (3.2 km)	A brief tornado touched down near Springfield Airport, destroying a few outbuildings and heavily damaging a home. Losses from the storm reached $200,000.
EF1	NW of Brighton	Polk	37°28′N 93°22′W	1316	9 miles (14 km)	An EF1 tornado damaged or destroyed several barns and outbuildings and caused moderate to severe damage to frame homes. Losses from the storm reached $2 million.
EF0	Ebenezer area	Greene	37°19′N 93°19′W	1321	4 miles (6.4 km)	Several trees and outbuildings were damaged.
EF1	SE of Swan to SW of Merritt	Taney, Christian, Douglas	36°46′N 93°01′W	1325	12 miles (19 km)	A 0.5 mi (0.80 km) wide, relatively long-tracked tornado tracked for 12 miles (19 km) through three counties. The most severe damage took place in Christian County, where two homes were damaged and several outbuildings were destroyed. Losses from the tornado reached $2.6 million.
EF1	E of Fordland	Webster	37°09′N 92°55′W	1338	4 miles (6.4 km)	A dairy farm lost its roof, a truck was lofted over a fence, and an outbuilding was destroyed.
EF2	W of Goodhope	Douglas	36°54′N 92°49′W	1339	2.5 miles (4.0 km)	A short-lived tornado tore the roof off a home and damaged numerous trees.
EF2	N of Merritt	Douglas	36°55′N 92°52′W	1339	2.5 miles (4.0 km)	A short-lived but very large 0.75 mi (1.21 km) tornado damaged two homes and several outbuildings. Losses from the storm reached $200,000.
EF2	ESE of March	Dallas	37°31′N 93°03′W	1341	4 miles (6.4 km)	A 400 yd (0.37 km) wide tornado made several touchdowns along a 4 mi (6.4 km) path. Peaking at EF2 intensity with estimated winds of 130 mph (210 km/h), the tornado destroyed three framed houses and numerous outbuildings. Two people were injured and had to be transported to a local hospital; one died of a heart attack en route.
EF1	N of Ava	Douglas	37.00°N 92.67°W	1400	1 mile (1.6 km)	A barn was destroyed and a few homes suffered minor damage.
EF1	NW of Hartville	Wright	37.30°N 92.55°W	1402	3.5 miles (5.6 km)	Several outbuildings were destroyed, and numerous trees were uprooted.
EF1	SW of Wasola	Ozark	36.76°N 92.61°W	1411	2 miles (3.2 km)	Seven outbuildings were destroyed and three homes were damaged; intense tree damage was also noted.
EF0	ESE of Mountain Grove	Texas	37.12°N 92.19°W	1422	3.5 miles (5.6 km)	Several buildings were damaged and numerous trees were uprooted.
EF1	WNW of Peace Valley	Howell	36.89°N 91.79°W	1435	9 miles (14 km)	A few homes and numerous trees were damaged.
EF2	W of Mountain View to SE of Summersville	Howell, Texas, Shannon	37.00°N 91.85°W	1435	21 miles (34 km)	A farm house was lifted and moved, injuring two people. Two auto shops and several homes and outbuildings were damaged or destroyed. Numerous trees were snapped or uprooted.
EF2	SE of Lebanon	Laclede	37.62°N 92.59°W	1440	2.2 miles (3.5 km)	Four homes and several outbuildings were damaged
EF1	ESE of Hazelton	Texas	37.50°N 91.95°W	1444	3.5 miles (5.6 km)	One barn was destroyed and one mobile home lost its roof.
EF2	SW of Alley Spring	Shannon		1445	12 miles (19 km)	Several buildings and a cabin at a sawmill were destroyed. Trees suffered extensive damage.
EF3	NW of Pomona	Howell	36.88°N 91.93°W	1500	2.2 miles (3.5 km)	One house, one mobile home, one travel trailer, two outbuildings, and an auto shop were destroyed. Cars were tossed 40 to 50 yards (37 to 46 m) away, and two school buses were blown over.
EF0	McBride area	Perry		1620	2.2 miles (3.5 km)	Damage limited to trees; the tornado was caught on tape.
EF1	SE of Fredericktown	Madison		unknown	0.5 miles (0.80 km)	
EF1	N of Ellington	Reynolds		unknown	2 miles (3.2 km)	Two homes had roof damage; trees suffered significant damage.
Illinois
EF1	WSW of Du Quoin	Jackson	37.95°N 89.40°W	1630	3 miles (4.8 km)	Structural damage to two barns, shingle damage to homes, power poles blown over, and dozens of trees were snapped or uprooted.
EF1	N of Thompsonville to NE of Crab Orchard	Franklin, Williamson		1945	5 miles (8.0 km)	Trees were damaged in a rural area.
EF0	N of Royalton	Franklin		unknown	unknown	A brief tornado touchdown was photographed.
Kentucky
EF1	E of Hiseville	Barren, Metcalfe	37.11°N 85.80°W	1904	4 miles (6.4 km)	Three outbuildings were destroyed, and one home and a pole barn were damaged.
EF3	S of Richmond	Garrard, Madison, Estill	37.68°N 84.37°W	2055	at least 22 miles (35 km)	2 deaths – Homes suffered severe damage. Several cars were flipped over. Five people were injured.
EF0	NW of Irvine	Estill		2123	less than 0.25 miles (0.40 km)	Two structures had metal roofing torn off. Several trees were knocked down, including one that damaged the porch of a home.
Tennessee
EF2	SE of Huntsville	Scott		2254	4.5 miles (7.2 km)	Seven homes were damaged and a freestanding cellphone tower collapsed.
EF2	SW of Tazewell	Claiborne		unknown	2.2 miles (3.5 km)	Two large barns were destroyed and one home lost its roof.
EF1	NE of Thorn Hill	Grainger, Hancock	36.40°N 83.34°W	2336	3.5 miles (5.6 km)	Barns and outbuildings were damaged heavily, and several homes suffered roof damage.
EF0	S of Gray	Washington	36.40°N 82.48°W	0045	unknown	Tornado touchdown was reported by law enforcement, but no damage reported.
EF0	NW of Etowah	McMinn		unknown	0.1 miles (0.16 km)	A tornado briefly touched down, causing damage to several trees.
Virginia
EF0	N of Clintwood	Dickenson	37°11′N 82°28′W	0100	0.75 miles (1.21 km)	Numerous trees were uprooted, one of which fell on a mobile home. Two homes suffered minor roof damage.
EF2	SE of Pound	Wise	37°04′N 82°33′W	0145	1.7 miles (2.7 km)	Two trailers and several outbuildings were destroyed, and a third trailer was damaged.
EF0	NW of Lebanon	Russell	36°54′N 82°05′W	0225	0.1 miles (0.16 km)	A tornado briefly touched down without any known impact.
EF2	NE of Lebanon	Russell	36°56′N 81°57′W	0230	1.1 miles (1.8 km)	One barn was destroyed, one home had moderate damage, and 100 trees were snapped or uprooted.
North Carolina
EF2	NW of Ennice	Alleghany	36°33′N 81°01′W	0344	5 miles (8.0 km)	A mobile home was destroyed, injuring four people. Five homes and several outbuildings were damaged, and cement silos were toppled, causing two additional injuries. Damages from the tornado amounted to $200,000.
EF1	SW of Ennice	Alleghany	36°33′N 81°00′W	0346	0.25 miles (0.40 km)	Three outbuildings were destroyed and one home and a pole barn were damaged.
Sources:National Weather Service Springfield, MO, National Weather Service St. Louis, MO, National Weather Service Paducah, KY, National Weather Service Louisville, KY, National Weather Service Jackson, KY, National Weather Service Morristown, TN

== See also ==
- List of derecho events
- Tornadoes of 2009
