= 2009 Super Derecho =

2009 derecho striking the Southern Midwest of the USA

Tornado outbreak and derecho of May 8, 2009
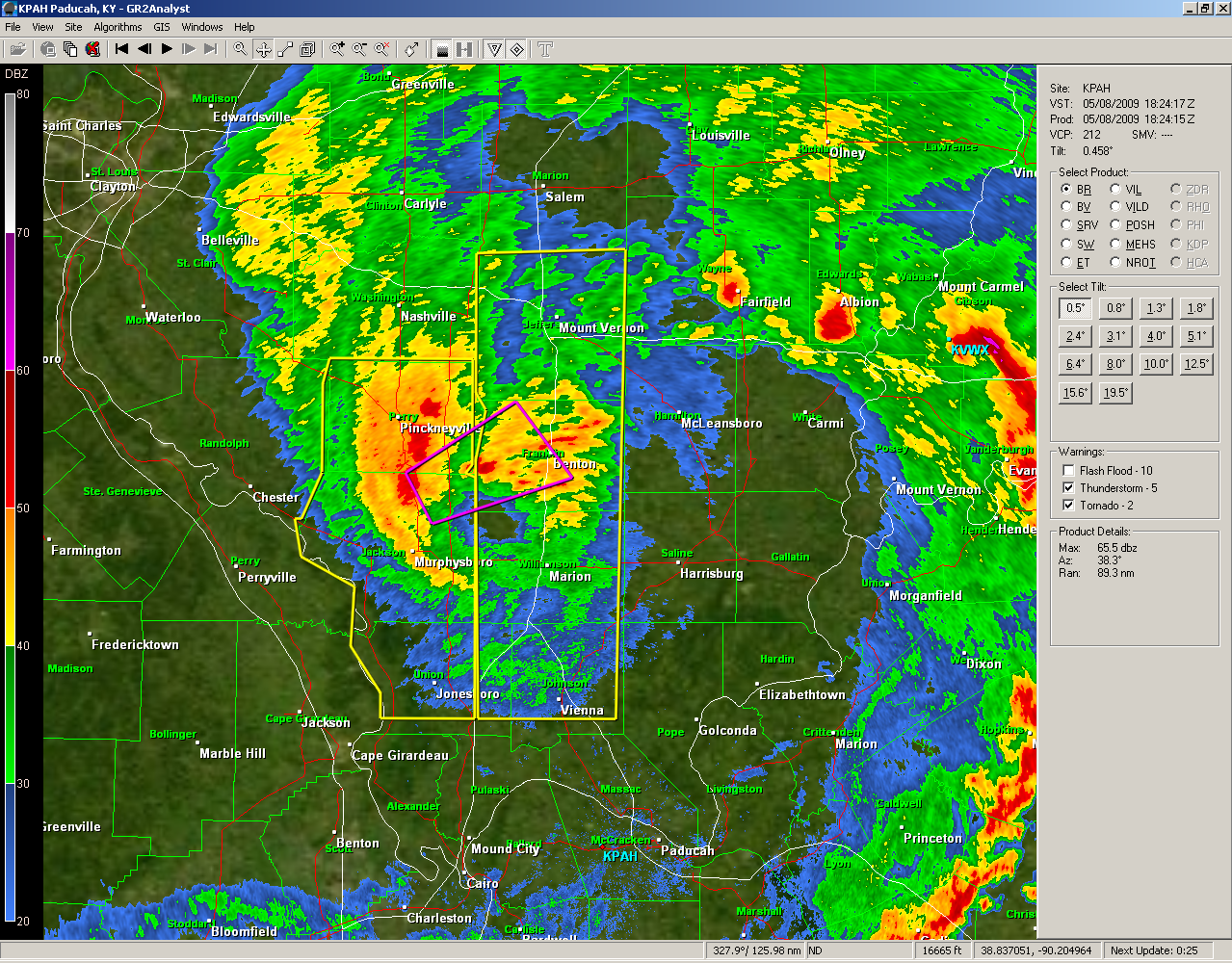
- A screenshot from the Paducah, Kentucky, radar of the mesoscale convective vortex portion of the derecho near Carbondale, Illinois. This screenshot is from the approximate time the 106 mph (171 km/h) wind gust was recorded at the Southern Illinois Airport.
- Date(s): May 8, 2009
- Duration: 15 hours, 28 minutes (tornado outbreak)
- Tornado count: 39 confirmed
- Strongest tornado^{1}: EF3 tornado
- Fatalities: Four direct, two indirect
- Damage costs: ~$500 million
- ^{1}Most severe tornado damage; see Fujita scale

The tornado outbreak and derecho of May 8, 2009, colloquially known as the 2009 Super Derecho, was an extreme progressive derecho, tornado outbreak, and mesoscale convective vortex (MCV) event that struck southeastern Kansas, southern Missouri, and southwestern Illinois on May 8, 2009. Thirty-nine tornadoes, including two of EF3 strength on the Enhanced Fujita Scale, were reported in addition to high non-tornadic winds associated with the derecho and MCV. Due to the abnormal shape of the storm on radar and the extremely strong winds, many called this an "inland hurricane." Notably, this storm had a defined eye akin to a tropical storm, which occurred alongside intense sustained winds of 70–90 mph (110–140 km/h) at the surface level, not associated with the bowing convection typical of a derecho. A new proper class of storm, the "super derecho", has been used to describe this event after analysis in 2010. Embedded supercells produced hail up to baseball size in southern Missouri, a rare event in a derecho. A wind gust of 106 mph (171 km/h) was recorded by a backup anemometer at the Southern Illinois Airport after official National Weather Service equipment failed. This derecho was the last of a series of derechos that occurred at the beginning of May.

== Meteorological synopsis ==
Radar animation spanning the lifetime of the storm

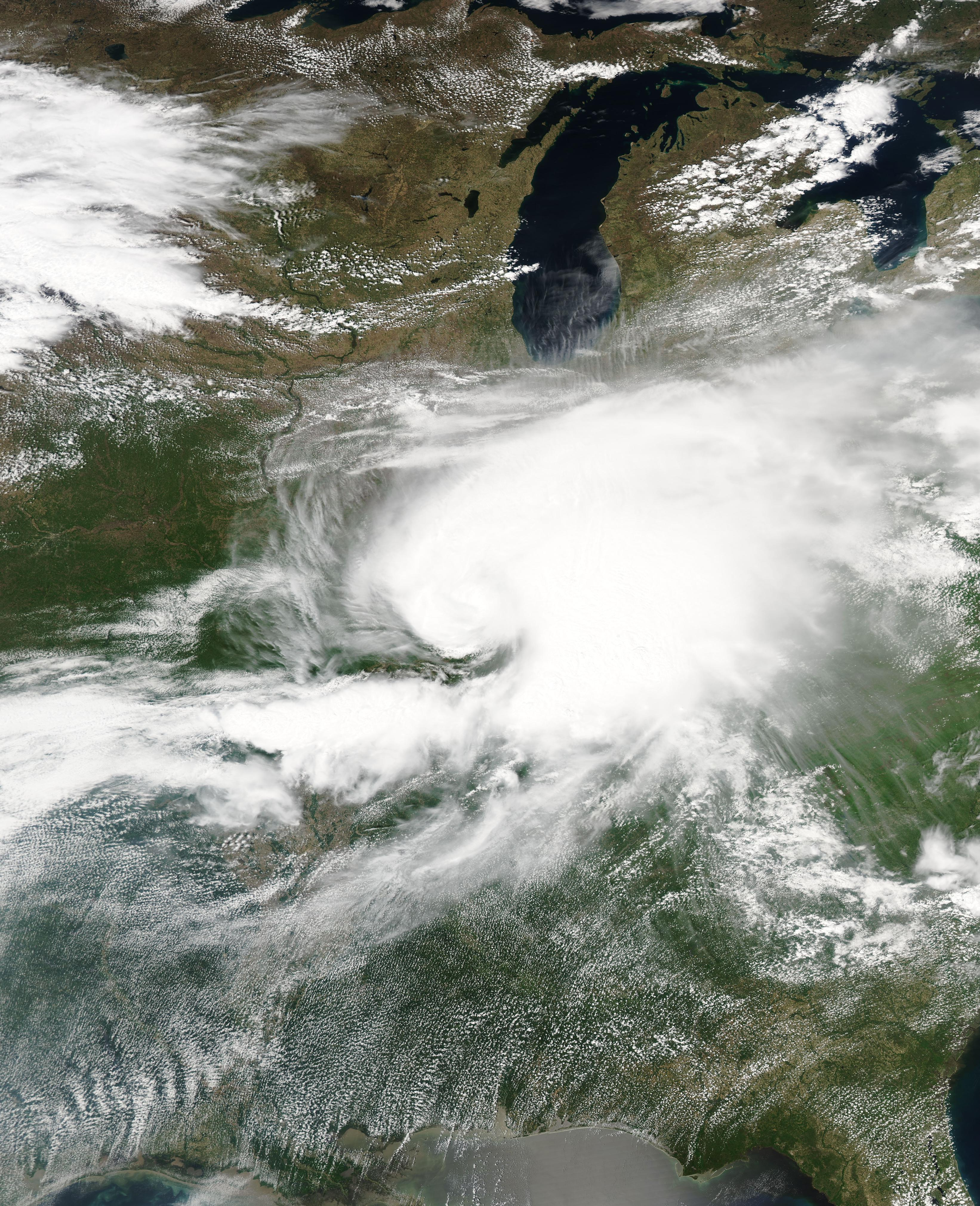
Satellite image of the Tornado outbreak and derecho of May 8, 2009, colloquially known as the 2009 Super Derecho.

A complex of thunderstorms formed over northwestern Kansas overnight May 7 and into the early morning hours of May 8, before moving into south-central Kansas, where greater moisture and stronger upper-level winds were present. The cluster of storms began to evolve into a more organized derecho near Hutchinson, Kansas, where National Weather Service damage surveys found winds greater than 100 mph (160 km/h) started, then continued through southern Missouri.

While in southwestern Missouri, the derecho began to change; supercells began to embed within the line, and a wake low began to form in conjunction with a bookend vortex on the northern end of the derecho. As the derecho entered southeastern Missouri, the initial line associated began to weaken, but the MCV became increasingly pronounced on the northern end.

Many experts and NWS meteorologists considered this to be one of the worst derechos and MCVs in the past decade. The Storm Prediction Center issued two "particularly dangerous situation" severe thunderstorm watches and a vividly worded tornado watch, mentioning the possibility of winds in excess of 105 mph (169 km/h). Local National Weather Service offices in Springfield, Missouri, and Paducah, Kentucky, also issued strongly worded severe thunderstorm warnings, with precautionary statements similar to those used in tornado warnings.

As both the initial squall line and MCV weakened, very little severe weather was reported between southern Illinois and central Kentucky. However, as the weakening squall line encountered higher instability and more favorable upper-level winds, the line split into several supercells in a process still not fully understood; these storms produced several tornadoes in central Kentucky, eastern Tennessee, southwestern Virginia, and northwestern North Carolina. While no longer producing severe weather itself, the MCV continued to enhance thunderstorms early the next morning across southeastern Virginia before finally moving out into the Atlantic Ocean.

=== Other similar events ===
Despite it at first seeming extremely rare, further research has found that similar storms have occurred previously. One case, which occurred in North Carolina on April 15, 1999, produced a killer tornado and a 165 mph (266 km/h) wind gust, although this may have been associated with a tornado. Another heavily studied event in northern Pennsylvania on July 21, 2003, also resulted in several tornadoes. However, these events lasted for a much shorter period of time and were significantly smaller; numerical modeling has shown that an average bookend vortex is only 12 nmi (22 km) across, while the May 2009 storm reached up to 40 nmi (74 km) in diameter.

== Confirmed tornadoes ==
Confirmed tornadoes by Enhanced Fujita rating
EFU	EF0	EF1	EF2	EF3	EF4	EF5	Total
0	9	18	11	2	0	0	40

=== May 8 event ===
List of reported tornadoes - Friday, May 8, 2009
EF#	Location	County	Coord.	Time (UTC)	Path length	Summary
Missouri
EF1	E of Pilgrim	Dade	37°22′N 93°45′W	1253	2 miles (3.2 km)	Brief tornado damaged several trees and outbuildings along an intermittent path.
EF1	Republic area	Greene	37°06′N 93°30′W	1305	4 miles (6.4 km)	Short-lived tornado tracked through downtown Republic, damaging about 50 structures. Losses from the storm reached $1 million.
EF1	NW of Springfield-Branson National Airport	Greene	37°15′N 93°23′W	1314	2 miles (3.2 km)	A brief tornado touched down near Springfield Airport, destroying a few outbuildings and heavily damaging a home. Losses from the storm reached $200,000.
EF1	NW of Brighton	Polk	37°28′N 93°22′W	1316	9 miles (14 km)	An EF1 tornado damaged or destroyed several barns and outbuildings and caused moderate to severe damage to frame homes. Losses from the storm reached $2 million.
EF0	Ebenezer area	Greene	37°19′N 93°19′W	1321	4 miles (6.4 km)	Several trees and outbuildings were damaged.
EF1	SE of Swan to SW of Merritt	Taney, Christian, Douglas	36°46′N 93°01′W	1325	12 miles (19 km)	A 0.5 mi (0.80 km) wide, relatively long-tracked tornado tracked for 12 miles (19 km) through three counties. The most severe damage took place in Christian County, where two homes were damaged, and several outbuildings were destroyed. Losses from the tornado reached $2.6 million.
EF1	E of Fordland	Webster	37°09′N 92°55′W	1338	4 miles (6.4 km)	A dairy farm lost its roof, a truck was lofted over a fence, and an outbuilding was destroyed.
EF2	W of Goodhope	Douglas	36°54′N 92°49′W	1339	2.5 miles (4.0 km)	A short-lived tornado tore the roof off a home and damaged numerous trees.
EF2	N of Merritt	Douglas	36°55′N 92°52′W	1339	2.5 miles (4.0 km)	A short-lived but very large 0.75 mi (1.21 km) tornado damaged two homes and several outbuildings. Losses from the storm reached $200,000.
EF2	ESE of March	Dallas	37°31′N 93°03′W	1341	4 miles (6.4 km)	A 400 yd (0.37 km) wide tornado made several touchdowns along a 4 mi (6.4 km) path. Peaking at EF2 intensity with estimated winds of 130 mph (210 km/h), the tornado destroyed three framed houses and numerous outbuildings. Two people were injured and had to be transported to a local hospital; one died of a heart attack en route.
EF1	N of Ava	Douglas	37.00°N 92.67°W	1400	1 mile (1.6 km)	A barn was destroyed, and a few homes suffered minor damage.
EF1	NW of Hartville	Wright	37.30°N 92.55°W	1402	3.5 miles (5.6 km)	Several outbuildings were destroyed, and numerous trees were uprooted.
EF1	SW of Wasola	Ozark	36.76°N 92.61°W	1411	2 miles (3.2 km)	Seven outbuildings were destroyed, and three homes were damaged; intense tree damage was also noted.
EF0	ESE of Mountain Grove	Texas	37.12°N 92.19°W	1422	3.5 miles (5.6 km)	Several buildings were damaged and numerous trees were uprooted.
EF1	WNW of Peace Valley	Howell	36.89°N 91.79°W	1435	9 miles (14 km)	A few homes and numerous trees were damaged.
EF2	W of Mountain View to SE of Summersville	Howell, Texas, Shannon	37.00°N 91.85°W	1435	21 miles (34 km)	A farmhouse was lifted and moved, injuring two people. Two auto shops and several homes and outbuildings were damaged or destroyed. Numerous trees were snapped or uprooted.
EF2	SE of Lebanon	Laclede	37.62°N 92.59°W	1440	2.2 miles (3.5 km)	Four homes and several outbuildings were damaged.
EF1	ESE of Hazelton	Texas	37.50°N 91.95°W	1444	3.5 miles (5.6 km)	One barn was destroyed, and one mobile home lost its roof.
EF2	SW of Alley Spring	Shannon		1445	12 miles (19 km)	Several buildings and a cabin at a sawmill were destroyed. Trees suffered extensive damage.
EF3	NW of Pomona	Howell	36.88°N 91.93°W	1500	2.2 miles (3.5 km)	One house, one mobile home, one travel trailer, two outbuildings, and an auto shop were destroyed. Cars were tossed 40 to 50 yards (37 to 46 m) away, and two school buses were blown over.
EF0	McBride area	Perry		1620	2.2 miles (3.5 km)	Damage limited to trees; the tornado was caught on tape.
EF1	SE of Fredericktown	Madison		unknown	0.5 miles (0.80 km)	
EF1	N of Ellington	Reynolds		unknown	2 miles (3.2 km)	Two homes had roof damage; trees suffered significant damage.
Illinois
EF1	WSW of Du Quoin	Jackson	37.95°N 89.40°W	1630	3 miles (4.8 km)	Structural damage to two barns, shingle damage to homes, power poles blown over, and dozens of trees were snapped or uprooted.
EF1	N of Thompsonville to NE of Crab Orchard	Franklin, Williamson		1945	5 miles (8.0 km)	Trees were damaged in a rural area.
EF0	N of Royalton	Franklin		unknown	unknown	A brief tornado touchdown was photographed.
Kentucky
EF1	E of Hiseville	Barren, Metcalfe	37.11°N 85.80°W	1904	4 miles (6.4 km)	Three outbuildings were destroyed, and one home and a pole barn were damaged.
EF3	S of Richmond	Garrard, Madison, Estill	37.68°N 84.37°W	2055	at least 22 miles (35 km)	2 deaths – Homes suffered severe damage. Several cars were flipped over. Five people were injured.
EF0	NW of Irvine	Estill		2123	less than 0.25 miles (0.40 km)	Two structures had metal roofing torn off. Several trees were knocked down, including one that damaged the porch of a home.
Tennessee
EF2	SE of Huntsville	Scott		2254	4.5 miles (7.2 km)	Seven homes were damaged, and a freestanding cellphone tower collapsed.
EF2	SW of Tazewell	Claiborne		unknown	2.2 miles (3.5 km)	Two large barns were destroyed, and one home lost its roof.
EF1	NE of Thorn Hill	Grainger, Hancock	36.40°N 83.34°W	2336	3.5 miles (5.6 km)	Barns and outbuildings were damaged heavily, and several homes suffered roof damage.
EF0	S of Gray	Washington	36.40°N 82.48°W	0045	unknown	Tornado touchdown was reported by law enforcement, but no damage reported.
EF0	NW of Etowah	McMinn		unknown	0.1 miles (0.16 km)	A tornado briefly touched down, causing damage to several trees.
Virginia
EF0	N of Clintwood	Dickenson	37°11′N 82°28′W	0100	0.75 miles (1.21 km)	Numerous trees were uprooted, one of which fell on a mobile home. Two homes suffered minor roof damage.
EF2	SE of Pound	Wise	37°04′N 82°33′W	0145	1.7 miles (2.7 km)	Two trailers and several outbuildings were destroyed, and a third trailer was damaged.
EF0	NW of Lebanon	Russell	36°54′N 82°05′W	0225	0.1 miles (0.16 km)	A tornado briefly touched down without any known impact.
EF2	NE of Lebanon	Russell	36°56′N 81°57′W	0230	1.1 miles (1.8 km)	One barn was destroyed, one home had moderate damage, and 100 trees were snapped or uprooted.
North Carolina
EF2	NW of Ennice	Alleghany	36°33′N 81°01′W	0344	5 miles (8.0 km)	A mobile home was destroyed, injuring four people. Five homes and several outbuildings were damaged, and cement silos were toppled, causing two additional injuries. Damages from the tornado amounted to $200,000.
EF1	SW of Ennice	Alleghany	36°33′N 81°00′W	0346	0.25 miles (0.40 km)	Three outbuildings were destroyed, and one home and a pole barn were damaged.
Sources:National Weather Service Springfield, MO, National Weather Service St. Louis, MO, National Weather Service Paducah, KY, National Weather Service Louisville, KY, National Weather Service Jackson, KY, National Weather Service Morristown, TN

== Effects ==
=== Kansas and southwestern Missouri ===
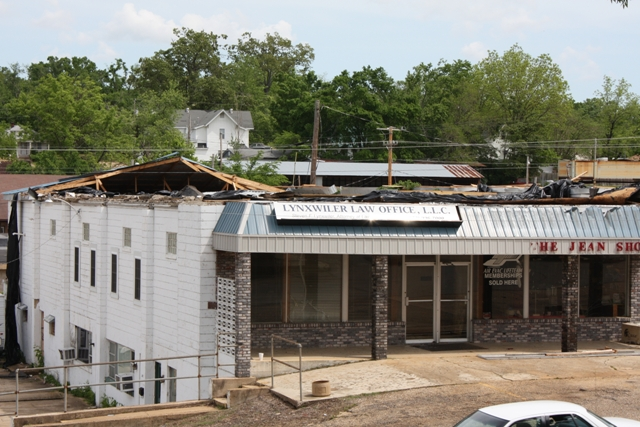
Damage to a business in downtown Doniphan, Missouri on May 8, 2009

The initial squall line formed in central Kansas, to the northwest of Hutchinson. In Hutchinson, several airplanes were flipped at a local airport, and 21,000 people were left without power. A woman was killed in New Albany, Kansas, when her mobile home was blown forty feet off of its foundation. National Weather Service survey teams found that winds reached 120 mph (190 km/h) in the area, which also resulted in the destruction of a church and the town's post office, in addition to damaging several homes. A total of 130 buildings were damaged in Cherokee, Kansas, including a high school gymnasium. Schools in several counties closed for the day, and a twenty-mile stretch of the Kansas Turnpike was closed for an hour due to flooding.

The derecho continued to intensify as it reached southwestern Missouri, where the storm forced several television stations in Joplin, Missouri, off the air after their transmission towers were downed; one station's tower landed on its studios. Numerous schools were damaged throughout the Springfield, Missouri, area, including a roof collapse at the Fair Grove High School, resulting in three injuries to students. There were numerous reports of tree and roof damage throughout Springfield, prompting some business to close. Drury University canceled some morning classes. A total of 346 buildings suffered some damage in Greene County, Missouri, and four people were injured, but none required hospitalization. A high school in Fair Grove suffered damage.

=== Southeastern Missouri and southwestern Illinois ===
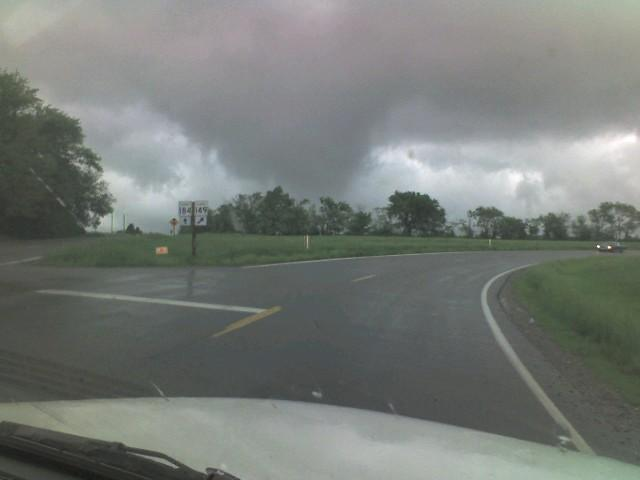
Picture of an EF-0 tornado north of Royalton, Illinois, on May 8, 2009

As the initial line weakened, the mesoscale convective vortex on the northern end began to strengthen and separate from the squall line. A long-lived supercell formed within the MCV in Madison County, Missouri, producing hail up to baseball size and a few tornadoes, in addition to the more widespread, damaging, straight-line winds throughout the area.

Numerous trees were knocked over from Shannon County, Missouri—near the Current and Jacks Fork rivers, in the Ozark National Scenic Riverways preserve—northward through the Mark Twain National Forest and other forested public conservation lands. Devastation was especially pronounced in the area west of Ironton, Missouri, around the popular Johnson's Shut-Ins State Park and the Bell Mountain Wilderness area. Over 50 miles of the long-distance Ozark Trail were damaged, requiring many months of repairs to rehabilitate.

As the MCV crossed the Mississippi River and entered into more populated areas, it strengthened greatly, while it nearly separated from the initial line. Numerous buildings were severely damaged or destroyed throughout southern Illinois. Immediately after the MCV struck, Carbondale was reported to be virtually impassable due to the amount of debris on roadways. Marion, Murphysboro, Grand Tower, Johnston City, Herrin, Energy, and Carterville, Illinois, declared curfews and states of emergency due to power outages and the massive amounts of damage caused by the storms. Some of these cities were even left without water due to the power outages. In the city of Carbondale, damage was estimated at US$3,000,000, excluding damage at Southern Illinois University. Officials deemed 34 buildings a "total loss" and reported that 3,000 trees were felled throughout the city.

Preliminary estimates placed damages at Southern Illinois University in excess of US$5,000,000. Numerous buildings on campus sustained roof damage, and nearly 100 windows were blown out of residence halls. Due to infrastructure damage from the storm, most communication by land line and mobile phone was reported to be impossible. In Carterville, Illinois, officials found 17 buildings to be a total loss. The city's public works garage was shifted off its foundation, and the police station sustained damage. In Franklin County, Illinois, 13 buildings were deemed to be beyond repair; damage assessments found that 184 buildings received some kind of damage from the storm. Winds were estimated between 80 and 90 mph (130 and 140 km/h) in the county. At one point, 68,000 people were left without power in southern Illinois alone, prompting unusual methods to restore power, such as using helicopters to clear debris and position power poles.

=== Elsewhere ===
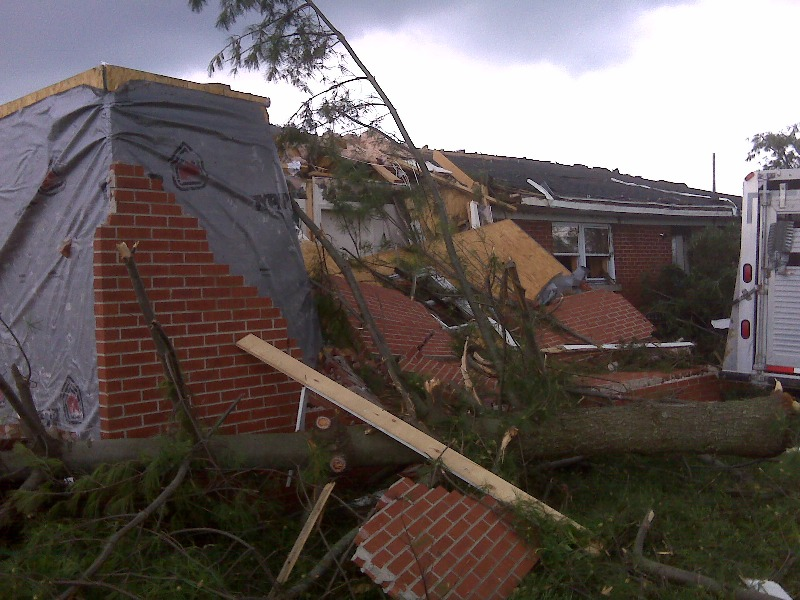
Damage to home in a subdivision in Madison County, Kentucky, from an EF3 tornado on May 8, 2009.

As the squall line continued east, it began to break apart into separate supercells; several of these supercells produced tornadoes. An EF3 tornado touched down in eastern Garrard County before tracking into southern Madison County, Kentucky; two people were killed in this tornado, five others were injured, and 150 homes were damaged. All of the injuries and deaths occurred in one mobile home near the intersection of KY 1295 and KY 52 in southern Madison County. Most of the damaged homes were in a subdivision in the Waco area, just north of the Blue Grass Army Depot. One mobile phone bill from a damaged house was carried 35 miles (56 km) before coming to rest on the property of a National Weather Service employee.

=== Flooding ===
The squall line and associated convection resulted in significant flooding south of St. Louis, Missouri and in eastern Kentucky.

Prior to becoming a mesocyclone, the system produced upwards of 4 in (100 mm) of rain over parts of Kansas during the morning hours. In Rice County, high waters washed out several small bridges and low water crossings and damaged concrete structures, leaving roughly $340,000 in losses. In some places, rainfall reached 4 in (100 mm) within a 30-minute span, leading to widespread street flooding. Up to ten drivers required rescue after their cars stalled in the flood waters. Flowing water over the Kansas Turnpike forced officials to shut down a 20 mi (32 km) stretch of the highway for over an hour. One person needed to be rescued in Lyon County after driving into a flooded street. Barricades were set up in some areas of the county due to rising waters. In Reno County, four bridges sustained severe flood damage and another was destroyed. Damages to the bridges amounted to $500,000. In some places, schools canceled classes due to the heavy rainfall.

In parts of Missouri, up to 4 in (100 mm) of rain fell in a short period of time, triggering flash flooding. Along Missouri Route 89, flood waters reached a depth of some 2 feet (60 cm.). Numerous side roads throughout several counties were closed due to flooding. In Washington County, the Big River overflowed its banks and inundated a nearby highway. More significant flooding took place in St. Francois County, where some homes had up to 8 ft (2.4 m) of water in their basements and railroads were partially washed out. A water rescue took place near the town of Bloomsdale. Some of the most severe flooding took place in the town of Doniphan, in Ripley County, where 5.03 in (128 mm) of rain fell in a 24-hour span. Ten people needed to be evacuated from their homes due to rising waters. The county courthouse and local high school sustained major water damage. At the school, all of the classrooms were flooded by up to 18 in (460 mm) of water, and a nearby parking lot buckled under the water. Several other structures in the area were also inundated during the storm, and two people needed to be rescued from their vehicle, which was stalled in waist-deep water. In Laclede County, severe flooding washed out low-lying roads and drainage culverts.

== Aftermath ==
On July 2, 2009, President Barack Obama declared a major disaster in Franklin, Gallatin, Jackson, Randolph, Saline, and Williamson counties in Illinois; Dolph A. Diemont was named as the Federal Emergency Management Agency coordinating officer for the area. FEMA also stated that further disaster declarations were possible as requested by the state. Missouri Governor Jay Nixon requested federal assistance for 46 counties in Missouri; damage in those counties was estimated to exceed US$48,700,000. On November 30, 2009, Senator Claire McCaskill announced that the State Emergency Management Agency of Missouri would receive $1,228,208.25 in federal grant money to cover the state's costs in "administering and managing" FEMA Public Assistance grants. In addition, it was announced that the Citizens Electric Corporation would receive a $1,395,201.46 grant to offset costs incurred in repairing infrastructure in Perry, Sainte Genevieve, and Cape Girardeau counties.

== See also ==
- List of North American tornadoes and tornado outbreaks
- May 2009 derecho series
- List of derecho events
