= Arditta, Missouri =

Unincorporated community in Missouri, U.S.

Coordinates: 36°36′59″N 92°03′46″W

Arditta is an unincorporated community in southwest Howell County, in the Ozarks of southern Missouri, United States. Arditta is located on U.S. Route 160 between Egypt Grove and Caulfield. It is approximately twelve miles southwest of West Plains.

== History ==
A post office called Arditta was established in 1904, and remained in operation until 1934. The origin of the name "Arditta" is unknown.

In 1925, Arditta had 14 inhabitants.
