= Olden =

Olden may refer to:

== Places ==
- Olden, Norway, a village in Stryn, Sogn og Fjordane county, Norway
- Olden, Missouri, an unincorporated community
- Olden, Texas, a community in Eastland county, Texas, USA

== People ==
- Andrew Olden, birth name of actor Andrew Ray
- Charles Smith Olden, an American politician
- Georg Olden (actor), an American child/teen actor
- Georg Olden (graphic designer), an American designer
- Paul Olden, an announcer at Yankee stadium
- Rudolf Olden, a German journalist
- Sondre Olden, a Norwegian hockey player

== Entertainment ==
- Olden (album), a 2004 album by alternative roots rock band 16 Horsepower

== See also ==
- Holden
