= Frankville =

Frankville may refer to:

- Frankville, Alabama
- Frankville, Iowa
- Frankville, Missouri
- Frankville, Nova Scotia
