= Fruitville =

Fruitville may refer to:

- Fruitville, Florida
- Fruitville, Minnesota
- Fruitville, Missouri
