= Crider, Missouri =

Unincorporated community in Missouri, U.S.

Coordinates: 36°43′05″N 92°04′42″W

Crider is an unincorporated community in western Howell County, in the U.S. state of Missouri. Crider is approximately ten miles west of West Plains and about two miles northwest of Pottersville and is located on Missouri Route AD.

The community was named after Pierce Crider, the original owner of the town site.
