= Chapel, Howell County, Missouri =

Unincorporated community in Missouri, U.S.

Coordinates: 36°56′08″N 91°40′32″W

Chapel is an unincorporated community in northeastern Howell County, in the U.S. state of Missouri. The community is located on county road 2680, east of Missouri Route W, and approximately four miles south-southeast of Mountain View. The Chapel Hill Church and historic school lie just west of Route W.

== History ==
A post office called Chapel was established in 1860, and remained in operation until 1883. The community took its name from nearby Chapel Hill Church.
