= Trask, Missouri =

Unincorporated community in Missouri, U.S.

Coordinates: 36°58′39″N 91°48′06″W

Trask is an unincorporated community in northern Howell County, in the U.S. state of Missouri. The community is located on Missouri Route V, approximately one mile south of U.S. Route 60 between Willow Springs and Mountain View.

== History ==
A post office called Trask was established in 1894, and remained in operation until 1933. The community has the name of the local Trask family.
