= Brooks Ridge =

Ridge in Missouri, U.S.

Coordinates: 36°53′24″N 91°43′48″W

Brooks Ridge is a ridge in Howell County in the U.S. state of Missouri. Brooks Ridge is named after Jacob Brooks, a pioneer settler.
