= Sterling, Missouri =

Unincorporated community in Missouri, U.S.

Coordinates: 37°02′38″N 92°00′30″W

Sterling is an unincorporated community in northwest Howell County, in the U.S. state of Missouri. The community is located adjacent to the railroad just east of U.S. Route 63, approximately one mile south of the county line.

== History ==
A post office called Sterling was established in 1883, and remained in operation until 1906. The community was named after John Sterling, a pioneer settler.
