= Fanchon, Missouri =

Unincorporated community in Missouri, U.S.

Coordinates: 36°47′42″N 91°42′02″W

Fanchon is an unincorporated community in eastern Howell County, in the U.S. state of Missouri. The community is located on Missouri Route EE, approximately nine miles northeast of West Plains. The site is on the north side of Middle Fork Creek, a tributary to the Eleven Point River to the east.

== History ==
A post office called Fanchon was established in 1900, and remained in operation until 1913. The origin of the name Fanchon is unknown.
