= Amy, Missouri =

- Unincorporated community
- Location within Missouri Location within the United States
- Coordinates: 36°36′20″N 92°00′14″W
- Country: United States
- State: Missouri
- County: Howell
- Elevation: 1,184 ft (361 m)
- Time zone: UTC-6 (Central (CST))
  - Summer (DST): UTC-5 (CDT)
- Area code: 417
- GNIS feature ID: 713270

Amy is an unincorporated community in Howell County, Missouri, United States. The community is located 12 miles (19 km) southwest of West Plains.

== History ==
A post office called Amy was established in 1891, and remained in operation until 1931. The community has the name of Amy Black, the daughter of a postal official.
