= Egypt Grove, Missouri =

Unincorporated community in Missouri, U.S.

Coordinates: 36°36′51″N 92°01′52″W

Egypt Grove is an unincorporated community in southwest Howell County, in the U.S. state of Missouri. The community is located along US Route 160, east of Caulfield.

The community was named for the fact that early settlers likened traveling to and from the community to the exodus from Egypt.
