= Dry Creek Township, Howell County, Missouri =

Township in Howell County, Missouri, U.S.

Coordinates: 36.8414°N 91.9128°W

Dry Creek Township is an inactive township in Howell County, in the U.S. state of Missouri.

Dry Creek Township takes its name from a creek of the same name within its borders.
