= Siloam Springs Township, Howell County, Missouri =

Township in Howell County, Missouri, U.S.

Coordinates: 36.8208°N 92.0461°W

Siloam Springs Township is an inactive township in Howell County, in the U.S. state of Missouri.

Siloam Springs Township was named after the springs of the same name within its borders.
