= Olden, Missouri =

Unincorporated community in Missouri, U.S.

Coordinates: 36°50′02″N 91°54′38″W

Olden is an unincorporated community in Howell County, in the U.S. state of Missouri. Olden is located just east of U.S. Route 63, approximately two miles south of Pomona.

== History ==
Olden was platted in 1882, and named after Benjamin Olden, a railroad official. A post office called Olden was established in 1883, and remained in operation until 1951.
