= South Fork Township, Howell County, Missouri =

Township in Howell County, Missouri, U.S.

Coordinates: 36.5742°N 91.8814°W

South Fork Township is an inactive township in Howell County, in the U.S. state of Missouri.

South Fork Township takes its name from South Fork Spring River.
