= China, Missouri =

- Unincorporated community
- Location within Missouri Location within the United States
- Coordinates: 36°36′43″N 91°53′59″W
- Country: United States
- State: Missouri
- County: Howell
- Elevation: 1,047 ft (319 m)
- Time zone: UTC-6 (Central (CST))
  - Summer (DST): UTC-5 (CDT)
- Area code: 417

China is an unincorporated community in southern Howell County, in the U.S. state of Missouri. The community is located along Missouri Route JJ, approximately eight miles (13 km) south-southeast of West Plains. The South Fork Spring River is approximately one mile (1.6 km) north of the site. The China Union Church sits adjacent to Route JJ at the location.

== History ==
A post office called China was established in 1892, and remained in operation until 1897. The community took its name from a local church of the same name.
