= Cureall, Missouri =

Unincorporated community in Missouri, U.S.

Coordinates: 36°40′02″N 92°04′15″W

Cureall (/ˈkjʊərɔːl/ KURE-awl) is an unincorporated community in Howell County, in the U.S. state of Missouri.

== History ==
A post office called Cureall was established in 1860, and remained in operation until 1958. The community was so named on account of a nearby mineral spring which was believed to hold medicinal qualities.
