= Leota, Missouri =

Unincorporated community in Missouri, U.S.

Coordinates: 36°31′53″N 92°02′16″W

Leota is an unincorporated community in southwestern Howell County, in the U.S. state of Missouri. The community is located on Missouri Route 142 and is approximately two miles north of the Missouri - Arkansas state line.

== History ==
A post office called Leota was established in 1902, and remained in operation until 1953. The community was named after Leota Cook, the daughter of a mining official.
