= Willow Springs Township, Howell County, Missouri =

Township in Howell County, Missouri, U.S.

Coordinates: 36.9697°N 91.9931°W

Willow Springs Township is an inactive township in Howell County, in the U.S. state of Missouri.

Willow Springs Township was named after a spring of the same name within its borders.
