= Cottbus, Missouri =

Unincorporated community in Missouri, US

Coordinates: 36°38′58″N 91°50′54″W

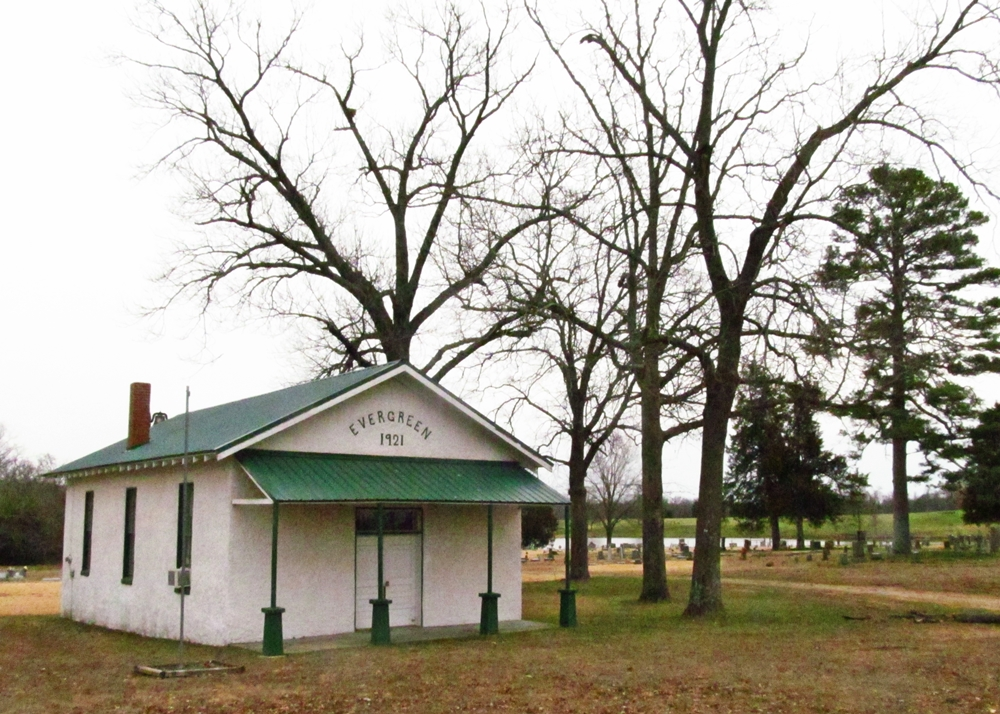
Evergreen church building and cemetery at Cottbus, Missouri

Cottbus is an unincorporated community in southern Howell County, Missouri, United States. It is located south of West Plains on County Road 8470 between State Routes 17 and PP.

== History ==
Cottbus was founded sometime before 1883. Dr. Charles T. Ludwig was the first postmaster and named it after his hometown of Cottbus, Brandenburg, Germany. A post office called Cottbus was established in 1880, and remained in operation until it was discontinued in 1914.
