= Lebo, Missouri =

Unincorporated community in Missouri, U.S.

Coordinates: 36°31′13″N 91°54′32″W

Location of Lebo within the state of Missouri

Lebo is an unincorporated community in southern Howell County, in the U.S. state of Missouri. The community is located south of West Plains at the intersection of Missouri routes 142 and JJ, approximately one mile north of the Missouri - Arkansas state line.

== History ==
A post office called Lebo was established in 1892, and remained in operation until 1932. The community was named after Lebo, Kansas, the native home of an early settler.
