= Sisson Township, Howell County, Missouri =

Township in Howell County, Missouri, U.S.

Coordinates: 36.8394°N 91.7656°W

Sisson Township is an inactive township in Howell County, in the U.S. state of Missouri.

Sisson Township has the name of an early plantation owner.
