= Chapel Township, Howell County, Missouri =

Township in Howell County, Missouri, U.S.

Chapel Township
- township
- Interactive map of Chapel Township
- Coordinates: 36.9136°N 91.7153°W
- Country: United States
- State: Missouri
- County: Howell

Chapel Township is an inactive township in Howell County, in the U.S. state of Missouri.

Chapel Township has the name of George Chapell, a pioneer citizen.
