= Horton, Howell County, Missouri =

Unincorporated community in Missouri, U.S.

Coordinates: 36°52′13″N 92°04′27″W

Horton is an unincorporated community in northwest Howell County, in the Ozarks of southern Missouri, United States. The community is located within the Mark Twain National Forest, west of Missouri Route AP and approximately one-half mile east of the Douglas - Howell county line. The Noblett Lake recreation area on Noblett Creek is just to the northwest in Douglas County.

== History ==
Horton was platted in 1883, and named after George Horton, a railroad official. A variant name was "Cordz". A post office called Cordz was established in 1886, and remained in operation until 1914. The Cordz name came about due to Henry V. C. Cordz, and his wife Nellie (Haaverson) Cordz, who served as postmistress.
