= Howell Township, Howell County, Missouri =

Township in Howell County, Missouri, U.S.

Coordinates: 36.7081°N 91.8122°W

Howell Township is an inactive township in Howell County, in the U.S. state of Missouri.

Howell Township has the name of the local Howell family.
