= Goldsberry Township, Howell County, Missouri =

Township in Howell County, Missouri, U.S.

Coordinates: 37.0125°N 91.7303°W

Goldsberry Township is an inactive township in Howell County, in the U.S. state of Missouri.

Goldsberry Township has the name of William H. Goldsberry, an early settler.
