= Cull, Missouri =

Unincorporated community in Missouri, US

Coordinates: 36°43′38″N 91°41′04″W

Cull is an unincorporated community in eastern Howell County, in the U.S. state of Missouri. The community is located on a county road south of U.S. Route 160 and is approximately nine miles east of West Plains, near the eastern border of the county. The community of Rover in Oregon County lies about two miles to the east.

== History ==
A post office called Cull was established in 1899, and remained in operation until 1936. The community is named after David W. Cull, who was credited with securing the town a post office.
