= Frankville, Missouri =

Unincorporated community in Missouri, U.S.

Coordinates: 36°41′50″N 91°48′21″W

Frankville is an unincorporated community in southern Howell County, in the U.S. state of Missouri. The community is located at the intersection of U.S. Route 63 and County Road 8660, approximately two miles southeast of West Plains.

== History ==
A post office called Frankville was established in 1869, and remained in operation until 1874. The community was named after Frank Chapin, the original owner of the town site.
