= Fruitville, Missouri =

Unincorporated community in Missouri, U.S.

Coordinates: 36°36′58″N 91°45′56″W

Fruitville is an unincorporated community in southeast Howell County, in the U.S. state of Missouri.

The community was located approximately eight miles southeast of West Plains and south of Missouri Route PP, along a county road on the east bank of Myatt Creek. The Meltabarger Cemetery is near the site.

== History ==
A post office called Fruitville was established in 1910, and remained in operation until 1921. The community was named for its location in a fruit-growing district. The area was promoted as a fruit growing area as Torreytown or Fruitville in 1910 by Col. Jay L. Torrey.
