= Pottersville, Missouri =

Unincorporated community in Missouri

Coordinates: 36°41′45″N 92°01′53″W

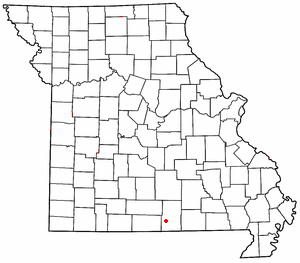

Pottersville is an unincorporated community in Howell County, Missouri, United States. It is located approximately ten miles west of West Plains. The ZIP Code for Pottersville is 65790.

The post office at Pottersville has been in operation since 1860. The community was named after Joel M. Potter, the original owner of the site.
