= Caulfield, Missouri =

- Unincorporated community
- Location within Missouri Location within the United States
- Coordinates: 36°36′52″N 92°06′18″W
- Country: United States
- State: Missouri
- County: Howell
- Elevation: 1,027 ft (313 m)
- Time zone: UTC-6 (Central (CST))
  - Summer (DST): UTC-5 (CDT)
- ZIP code: 65626
- Area code: 417
- GNIS feature ID: 715508

Caulfield is an unincorporated community in western Howell County, Missouri, United States. It is located on U.S. Highway 160 and Missouri Route 101, approximately 15 miles west of West Plains. The Ozark County line lies just to the west of Caulfield.

== History ==
A post office called Caulfield has been in operation since 1929. The community takes its name from Missouri governor Henry Stewart Caulfield, who assumed office in 1929.

On March 1, 2007, a tornado hit Caulfield, killing seven-year-old Caulfield resident, Elizabeth Croney.
