= Indian Valley, Virginia =

Unincorporated community in Virginia, United States

- Unincorporated community
- Location within Virginia Location within the United States
- Coordinates: 36°54′31″N 80°33′07″W
- Country: United States
- State: Virginia
- County: Floyd
- Time zone: UTC−5 (Eastern (EST))
  - Summer (DST): UTC−4 (EDT)
- Postal code: 24105
- Area code: 540

Indian Valley is an unincorporated community in Floyd County, Virginia, United States. It used to be called Phillips. It has a post office, Floyd County Rescue Squad Station #4, Floyd County Fire Department Station #4, Indian Valley Elementary School, and a garage; Marshall's Automotive and Body Shop.
