= Fairview, Mississippi =

- Unincorporated community
- Location within Mississippi Location within the United States
- Coordinates: 33°30′33″N 90°44′48″W
- Country: United States
- State: Mississippi
- County: Sunflower
- Elevation: 121 ft (37 m)
- Time zone: UTC-6 (Central (CST))
  - Summer (DST): UTC-5 (CDT)
- ZIP code: 38751
- Area code: 662
- GNIS feature ID: 691856

Fairview is an unincorporated community located in Sunflower County, Mississippi. Fairview is approximately 7 miles (11 km) north of Holly Ridge and approximately 8 miles (13 km) south of Shaw on Fairview Road.
