= Ennice, North Carolina =

- Unincorporated community
- Location within North Carolina Location within the United States
- Coordinates: 36°33′12″N 80°59′45″W
- Country: United States
- State: North Carolina
- County: Alleghany
- Elevation: 2,543 ft (775 m)
- Time zone: UTC-5 (Eastern (EST))
  - Summer (DST): UTC-4 (EDT)
- ZIP code: 28623
- Area code: 336
- GNIS feature ID: 984800

Ennice is an unincorporated community in Alleghany County, North Carolina, United States. Ennice is located on North Carolina Highway 18, 7.7 miles (12.4 km) east-northeast of Sparta. Ennice has a post office with ZIP code 28623, which opened on March 6, 1888.

At the time of European colonization, the region surrounding Ennice and Alleghany County was home to Native American tribes, including the Cherokee and Shawnee. By the late 18th century, most Native Peoples had been displaced from the area by colonizers.

== Geography and climate ==
Ennice is located in the Blue Ridge Mountains of North Carolina, part of the Appalachian Mountain Range of North America. The surrounding region falls into Cfa-Cfb on the Köppen−Geiger Climate Classification, categorized as Humid Subtropical Climate to Temperate Oceanic Climate respectively. The USDA Plant Hardiness Map indicates Ennice is located in zone 6b, with average minimum winter temperatures between −5–0 °F (−21 – −18 °C).

According to the National Weather Service, the average annual mean temperature in Alleghany County is 50.4 °F (10.2 °C). The hottest month of the year is July, with an average high temperature of 79.1 °F (26.2 °C) with an average low of 58.3 °F (14.6 °C). The coldest month of the year is January, with an average high temperature of 41.8 °F (5.4 °C) and average low of 21.8 °F (−5.7 °C).
