= Peace Valley, Missouri =

Unincorporated community in Missouri, U.S.

Coordinates: 36°52′28″N 91°43′53″W

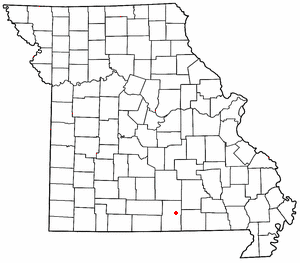

Peace Valley is a small Unincorporated community in eastern Howell County, Missouri, United States. It is located approximately two miles east of Route 17 on Route W.

A post office called Peace Valley has been in operation since 1876. The community has the name of Elgin and William Peace, pioneer settlers.
