= Pilgrim Township, Dade County, Missouri =

Township in the American state of Missouri

Coordinates: 37.36°N 93.75°W

Pilgrim Township is a township in Dade County, in the U.S. state of Missouri.

== History ==
Pilgrim Township was named after the settlement of Pilgrim, Missouri, which is still listed by the USGS as an unincorporated community. A post office called Pilgrim was established in 1886, and remained in operation until 1907. A first settler of the community was a native of Kentucky; this Missouri town may have been named after Pilgrim, Kentucky.
