= Swan, Missouri =

Unincorporated community in Missouri, U.S.

Coordinates: 36°47′43″N 93°03′46″W

Swan is an unincorporated community in north central Taney County, in the U.S. state of Missouri. Swan is located on Missouri Route AA, along Blue Creek and approximately 3.5 miles northwest of Taneyville.

== History ==
A post office called Swan was established in 1880, and remained in operation until 1957. The community takes its name from nearby Swan Creek.
