= Pomona, Missouri =

- Census-designated place
- Location within Missouri Location within the United States
- Coordinates: 36°52′2″N 91°54′51″W
- Country: United States
- State: Missouri
- County: Howell

Area
  - Total: 3.57 sq mi (9.25 km^{2})
  - Land: 3.57 sq mi (9.24 km^{2})
  - Water: 0.0039 sq mi (0.01 km^{2})
- Elevation: 1,247 ft (380 m)

Population (2020)
  - Total: 440
  - Density: 123.3/sq mi (47.62/km^{2})
- Time zone: UTC-6 (Central (CST))
  - Summer (DST): UTC-5 (CDT)
- ZIP code: 65789
- Area code: 417
- FIPS code: 29-58934
- GNIS feature ID: 2587105

Pomona is an unincorporated community and census-designated place (CDP) in Howell County, Missouri, United States. It is located midway between Willow Springs and West Plains. As of the 2010 census, Pomona had a population of 511.

A post office called Pomona has been in operation since 1895. The community was named for Pomona, the Roman goddess of fruit trees; this area was a major producer of apples.

== Demographics ==
Historical population
Census	Pop.	Note	%±
2020	440		—
U.S. Decennial Census
