= Howell County, Missouri =

County in Missouri, United States

- County
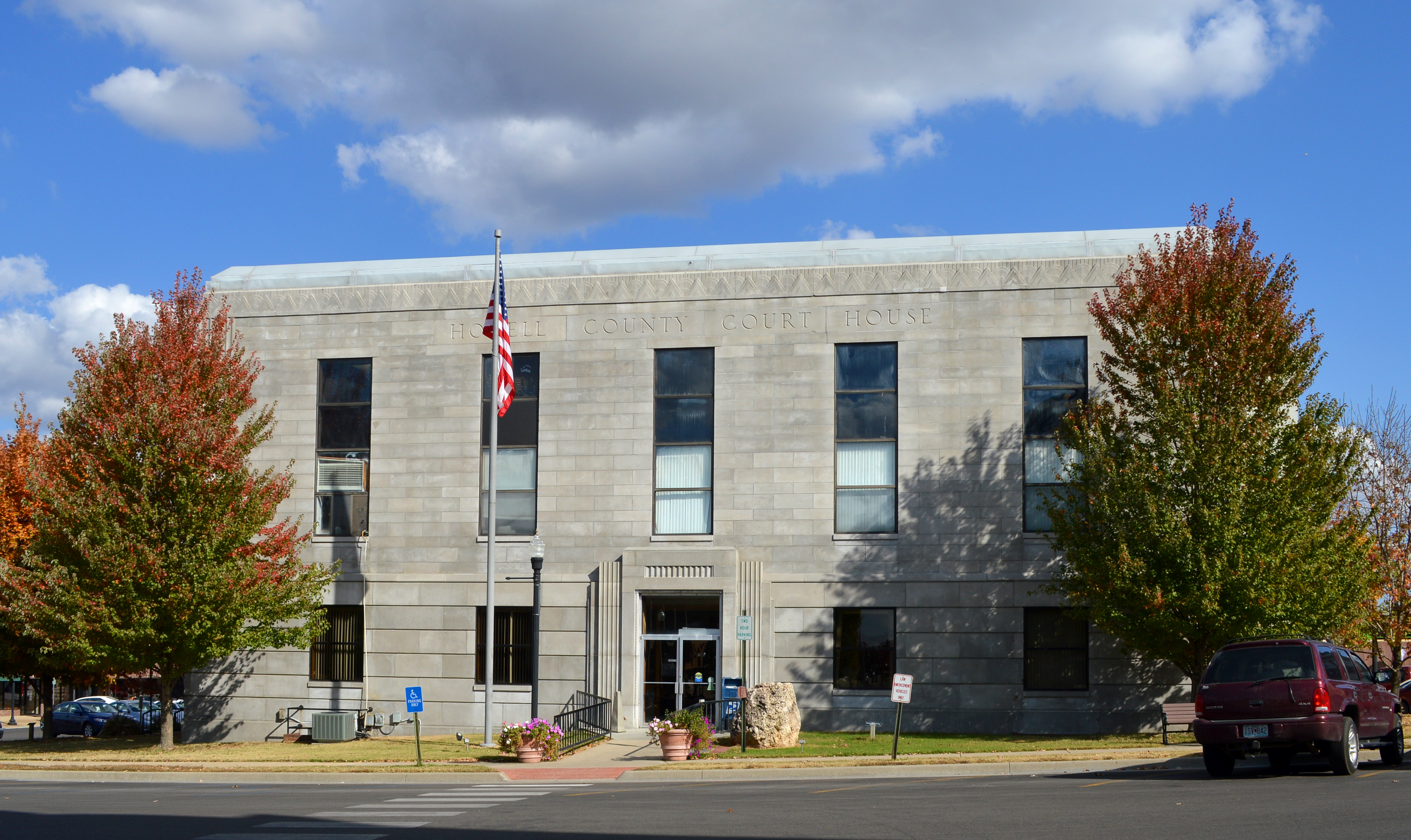
- Howell County Courthouse in West Plains

- Location within the U.S. state of Missouri
- Coordinates: 36°46′N 91°53′W
- Country: United States
- State: Missouri
- Founded: March 2, 1857
- Named for: Josiah Howell
- Seat: West Plains
- Largest city: West Plains

Area
  - Total: 928 sq mi (2,400 km^{2})
  - Land: 927 sq mi (2,400 km^{2})
  - Water: 1.1 sq mi (2.8 km^{2}) 0.1%

Population (2020)
  - Total: 39,750
  - Estimate (2025): 40,798 ▲
  - Density: 42.9/sq mi (16.6/km^{2})
- Time zone: UTC−6 (Central)
  - Summer (DST): UTC−5 (CDT)
- Congressional district: 8th
- Website: howellcountymo.gov

Howell County is in southern Missouri. As of the 2020 census, the population was 39,750. The largest city and county seat is West Plains. The county was officially organized on March 2, 1857, and is named after Josiah Howell, a pioneer settler in the Howell Valley.

Howell County comprises the West Plains, MO, Micropolitan Statistical Area.

== History ==
Howell County was organized on March 2, 1857, from Oregon County, and is named for Josiah Howell, who purchased the first settlement in Howell Valley after the original settler left (possibly due to loneliness). Howell is considered the first permanent settler. His descendants contributed greatly to the developing community and held many positions of local authority.

The first circuit court met in a log cabin one mile east of West Plains, according to an 1876 account. A small, wooden courthouse was built on the square in West Plains in 1859. It was burned down during the Civil War in 1862. The county was reorganized three years later, but all of the county records were destroyed in an 1866 fire. A second courthouse was built in West Plains in 1869. It was a small, three-room, frame building, about 24 by 30 feet.

== Geography ==
According to the U.S. Census Bureau, the county has a total area of 928 square miles (2,400 km^{2}), of which 927 square miles (2,400 km^{2}) is land and 1.1 square miles (2.8 km^{2}) (0.1%) is water. It is the third-largest county in Missouri by land area and fourth-largest by total area.

=== Adjacent counties ===
- Texas County (north)
- Shannon County (northeast)
- Oregon County (east)
- Fulton County, Arkansas (south)
- Ozark County (southwest)
- Douglas County (northwest)

=== Major highways ===
- U.S. Route 60
- U.S. Route 63
- U.S. Route 160
- Route 14
- Route 17
- Route 76
- Route 142

=== National protected area ===
- Mark Twain National Forest (part)

== Demographics ==
Historical population
Census	Pop.	Note	%±
1860	3,169		—
1870	4,218		33.1%
1880	8,814		109.0%
1890	18,618		111.2%
1900	21,834		17.3%
1910	21,065		−3.5%
1920	21,102		0.2%
1930	19,672		−6.8%
1940	22,270		13.2%
1950	22,725		2.0%
1960	22,027		−3.1%
1970	23,521		6.8%
1980	28,807		22.5%
1990	31,447		9.2%
2000	37,238		18.4%
2010	40,400		8.5%
2020	39,750		−1.6%
2025 (est.)	40,798	▲	2.6%
U.S. Decennial Census; 1790-1960 1900-1990; 1990-2000 2010

=== 2020 census ===
As of the 2020 census, the county had a population of 39,750. The median age was 41.5 years. 23.8% of residents were under the age of 18 and 21.0% of residents were 65 years of age or older.

For every 100 females there were 95.4 males, and for every 100 females age 18 and over there were 91.9 males age 18 and over.

The racial makeup of the county was 91.4% White, 0.5% Black or African American, 0.7% American Indian and Alaska Native, 0.6% Asian, 0.1% Native Hawaiian and Pacific Islander, 0.7% from some other race, and 6.1% from two or more races. Hispanic or Latino residents of any race comprised 2.3% of the population.

Howell County, Missouri – Racial and ethnic composition Note: the US Census treats Hispanic/Latino as an ethnic category. This table excludes Latinos from the racial categories and assigns them to a separate category. Hispanics/Latinos may be of any race.
Race / Ethnicity (NH = Non-Hispanic)	Pop 1980	Pop 1990	Pop 2000	Pop 2010	Pop 2020	% 1980	% 1990	% 2000	% 2010	% 2020
White alone (NH)	28,424	30,983	35,623	38,499	35,972	98.67%	98.52%	95.66%	95.29%	90.50%
Black or African American alone (NH)	46	62	114	154	180	0.16%	0.20%	0.31%	0.38%	0.45%
Native American or Alaska Native alone (NH)	179	164	331	249	265	0.62%	0.52%	0.89%	0.62%	0.67%
Asian alone (NH)	31	75	130	195	217	0.11%	0.24%	0.35%	0.48%	0.55%
Native Hawaiian or Pacific Islander alone (NH)	x	x	11	14	17	x	x	0.03%	0.03%	0.04%
Other race alone (NH)	12	2	19	14	109	0.04%	0.01%	0.05%	0.03%	0.27%
Mixed race or Multiracial (NH)	x	x	560	578	2,094	x	x	1.50%	1.43%	5.27%
Hispanic or Latino (any race)	115	161	450	697	896	0.40%	0.51%	1.21%	1.73%	2.25%
Total	28,807	31,447	37,238	40,400	39,750	100.00%	100.00%	100.00%	100.00%	100.00%

29.8% of residents lived in urban areas, while 70.2% lived in rural areas.

There were 16,117 households in the county, of which 28.9% had children under the age of 18 living with them and 26.8% had a female householder with no spouse or partner present. About 29.8% of all households were made up of individuals and 14.1% had someone living alone who was 65 years of age or older.

There were 18,048 housing units, of which 10.7% were vacant. Among occupied housing units, 67.2% were owner-occupied and 32.8% were renter-occupied. The homeowner vacancy rate was 2.2% and the rental vacancy rate was 9.1%.

=== 2000 census ===
As of the 2000 census, there were 37,238 people, 14,762 households, and 10,613 families residing in the county. The population density was 40 people per square mile (15 people/km^{2}). There were 16,340 housing units at an average density of 18 units per square mile (6.9/km^{2}).

The racial makeup of the county was 96.41% White, 0.31% Black or African American, 0.97% Native American, 0.36% Asian, 0.04% Pacific Islander, 0.28% from other races, and 1.63% from two or more races. Approximately 1.21% of the population were Hispanic or Latino of any race.

There were 14,762 households, out of which 32.7% had children under the age of 18 living with them, 58.8% were married couples living together, 9.9% had a female householder with no husband present, and 28.10% were non-families. 25.0% of all households were made up of individuals, and 12.3% had someone living alone who was 65 years of age or older. The average household size was 2.47 and the average family size was 2.94.

In the county, the population consisted of 26.0% under the age of 18, 7.8% from 18 to 24, 26.2% from 25 to 44, 23.30% from 45 to 64, and 16.8% who were 65 years of age or older. The median age was 38 years. For every 100 females there were 93.6 males. For every 100 females age 18 and over, there were 88.5 males.

The median income for a household in the county was $31,761, and the median income for a family was $38,047. Males had a median income of $22,960 versus $16,968 for females. The per capita income for the county was $17,184. About 14.00% of families and 18.7% of the population were below the poverty line, including 26.3% of those under age 18 and 14.0% of those age 65 or over.

=== Religion ===
According to the Association of Religion Data Archives County Membership Report (2000), Howell County is a part of the Bible Belt with evangelical Protestantism being the majority religion. The most predominant denominations among residents in Howell County who adhere to a religion are Southern Baptists (47.70%), Churches of Christ (8.81%), and Roman Catholics (6.99%).

== Education ==
Of adults 25 years of age and older in Howell County, 73.4% possesses a high school diploma or higher while 10.9% holds a bachelor's degree or higher as their highest educational attainment.

=== Public schools ===
- Mountain View-Birch Tree R-III School District - Mountain View
  - Birch Tree Elementary School - Birch Tree - (PK-06) - Located in Shannon County
  - Mountain View Elementary School - (PK-06)
  - Liberty Middle School - (07-08)
  - Liberty High School - (09-12)
- West Plains R-7 School District - West Plains
  - South Fork Elementary School (K-06)
  - West Plains Elementary School (K-04)
  - West Plains Middle School (05-08)
  - West Plains High School (09-12)
- Willow Springs R-IV School District - Willow Springs
  - Willow Springs Elementary School (PK-04)
  - Willow Springs Middle School (05-08)
  - Willow Springs High School (09-12)
- Fairview R-XI School District - West Plains
  - Fairview Elementary School (K-08)
- Glenwood R-VIII School District - West Plains
  - Glenwood Elementary School - (PK-08)
- Howell Valley R-I School District - West Plains
  - Howell Valley Elementary School (K-08)
- Junction Hill C-12 School District - West Plains
  - Junction Hill Elementary School - (K-08)
- Richards R-V School District - West Plains
  - Richards Elementary School - (K-08)

=== Private schools ===
- Faith Assembly Christian School - West Plains - (PK-12) - Assemblies of God/Pentecostal
- Ozarks Christian Academy - West Plains - (K-10) - non denominational/Protestant - Classical Christian Education
- Trinity Christian Academy - Mountain View - (K-12) - Pentecostal - Wade St., Mountain View.

=== Alternative and vocational schools ===
- Ozark Horizon State School - West Plains - (K-12) - A school for handicapped students and those with other special needs.
- South Central Career Center - West Plains - (09-12) - Vocational/technical

=== Colleges and universities ===
- Missouri State University-West Plains - A satellite campus of Missouri State University

=== Public libraries ===
- Mountain View Public Library
- West Plains Public Library
- Willow Springs Public Library

== Politics ==
=== Local ===
Howell County, Missouri

Elected countywide officials
Assessor	Daniel Franks	Republican
Circuit Clerk	Cynthia Lee	Republican
County Clerk	Kelly Waggoner	Republican
Collector	Janet Crow	Republican
Commissioner (presiding)	Ralph Riggs	Republican
Commissioner (district 1)	Calvin Wood	Republican
Commissioner (district 2)	Bruce Williams	Republican
Coroner	James T. "Tim" Cherry	Republican
Prosecuting Attorney	Michael P. Hutchings	Republican
Public Administrator	John Pruett	Republican
Recorder	Jeff Brasier	Republican
Sheriff	Matt Roberts	Republican
Surveyor	Ralph Riggs	Republican
Treasurer	Nancy Franz	Republican

The Republican Party predominantly controls politics at the local level in Howell County. Republicans hold all elected positions in the county. District 2 (Southern) Commissioner Billy Sexton took office as a Democrat but announced in 2014 he was changing parties and sought re-election as a Republican.

=== State ===
Past Gubernatorial Elections Results
Year	Republican	Democratic	Third Parties
2024	81.42% 15,231	16.67% 3,118	1.91% 358
2020	81.04% 14,947	17.40% 3,210	1.56% 287
2016	70.65% 12,266	25.68% 4,459	3.67% 637
2012	54.23% 8,849	42.59% 6,950	3.19% 520
2008	45.33% 7,659	52.11% 8,804	2.56% 432
2004	64.89% 10,595	33.48% 5,466	1.63% 267
2000	53.51% 7,537	44.77% 6,306	1.72% 242
1996	51.71% 7,030	44.78% 6,087	3.51% 477
1992	48.26% 6,401	51.74% 6,862	0.00% 0
1988	71.70% 8,321	27.69% 3,214	0.61% 71
1984	70.90% 8,476	29.10% 3,479	0.00% 0
1980	59.53% 6,956	40.32% 4,711	0.15% 18
1976	57.07% 5,673	42.77% 4,251	0.16% 16
1972	61.53% 6,296	38.40% 3,929	0.07% 7
1968	48.33% 4,605	51.67% 4,923	0.00% 0
1964	47.58% 4,453	52.42% 4,905	0.00% 0
1960	64.55% 6,166	35.45% 3,386	0.00% 0

In the Missouri House of Representatives, Howell County is divided into two legislative districts, both of which are represented by Republicans.

- District 154 — Shawn Rhoads (R-West Plains. Consists of most of the entire county.

Missouri House of Representatives — Missouri House of Representatives — District 154 — Howell County (2016)
Party	Candidate	Votes	%	±%
Republican	Shaun Rhoads	11,563	74.93%	−25.07
Independent	Terry Hampton	3,868	25.07%	+25.07

Missouri House of Representatives — District 154 — Howell County (2014)
Party	Candidate	Votes	%	±%
Republican	Shaun Rhoads	5,933	100.00%	+31.47

Missouri House of Representatives — District 154 — Howell County (2012)
Party	Candidate	Votes	%	±%
Republican	Shaun Rhoads	9,950	68.53%	
Democratic	R.A. Pendergrass	4,570	31.47%	

- District 142 — Robert Ross (R-Yukon). Consists of the city of Mountain View.

Missouri House of Representatives — District 142 — Howell County (2016)
Party	Candidate	Votes	%	±%
Republican	Robert Ross	1,196	82.43%	−17.57
Democratic	Bobby Johnston, Jr.	255	17.57%	+17.57

Missouri House of Representatives — District 142 — Howell County (2014)
Party	Candidate	Votes	%	±%
Republican	Robert Ross	589	100.00%	

Missouri House of Representatives — District 142 — Howell County (2012)
Party	Candidate	Votes	%	±%
Republican	Robert Ross	1,173	100.00%	

All of Howell County is a part of Missouri's 33rd District in the Missouri Senate and is currently represented by Mike Cunningham of Rogersville.

Missouri Senate — District 33 — Howell County (2016)
Party	Candidate	Votes	%	±%
Republican	Mike Cunningham	14,995	100.00%	

Missouri Senate — District 33 — Howell County (2012)
Party	Candidate	Votes	%	±%
Republican	Mike Cunningham	13,700	100.00%	

=== Federal ===
Missouri's two U.S. senators are Republicans Josh Hawley and Eric Schmitt.

U.S. Senate — Missouri — Howell County (2016)
Party	Candidate	Votes	%	±%
Republican	Roy Blunt	12,070	69.61%	+18.26
Democratic	Jason Kander	4,375	25.23%	−15.97
Libertarian	Jonathan Dine	433	2.50%	−4.95
Green	Johnathan McFarland	218	1.26%	+1.26
Constitution	Fred Ryman	243	1.40%	+1.40

U.S. Senate — Missouri — Howell County (2012)
Party	Candidate	Votes	%	±%
Republican	Todd Akin	8,340	51.35%	
Democratic	Claire McCaskill	6,692	41.20%	
Libertarian	Jonathan Dine	1,210	7.45%	

All of Howell County is included in Missouri's 8th congressional district and is currently represented by Jason T. Smith of Salem in the U.S. House of Representatives. Smith won a special election on Tuesday, June 4, 2013, to complete the remaining term of former U.S. Representative Jo Ann Emerson of Cape Girardeau. Emerson announced her resignation a month after being reelected with over 70 percent of the vote in the district. She resigned to become CEO of the National Rural Electric Cooperative.

U.S. House of Representatives — Missouri's 8th Congressional District — Howell County (2016)
Party	Candidate	Votes	%	±%
Republican	Jason T. Smith	13,655	80.64%	+19.51
Democratic	Dave Cowell	2,776	16.38%	+5.05
Libertarian	Jonathan Shell	505	2.98%	+1.45

U.S. House of Representatives — Missouri's 8th Congressional District — Howell County (2014)
Party	Candidate	Votes	%	±%
Republican	Jason T. Smith	4,742	61.13%	−7.91
Democratic	Barbara Stocker	879	11.33%	−7.36
Libertarian	Rick Vandeven	119	1.53%	−0.39
Constitution	Doug Enyart	163	2.10%	−8.25
Independent	Terry Hampton	1,854	23.90%	+23.90

U.S. House of Representatives — Missouri's 8th Congressional District — Special Election — Howell County (2013)
Party	Candidate	Votes	%	±%
Republican	Jason T. Smith	2,268	69.04%	−8.16
Democratic	Steven Hodges	614	18.69%	+0.75
Libertarian	Bill Slantz	63	1.92%	−2.94
Constitution	Doug Enyart	340	10.35%	+10.35

U.S. House of Representatives — Missouri's 8th Congressional District — Howell County (2012)
Party	Candidate	Votes	%	±%
Republican	Jo Ann Emerson	12,456	77.20%	
Democratic	Jack Rushin	2,895	17.94%	
Libertarian	Rick Vandeven	784	4.86%	

==== Political culture ====
United States presidential election results for Howell County, Missouri
Year	Republican		Democratic		Third party(ies)	
Year	No.	%	No.	%	No.	%
1888	1,370	42.71%	1,506	46.95%	332	10.35%
1892	1,484	41.93%	1,642	46.40%	413	11.67%
1896	1,892	44.02%	2,373	55.21%	33	0.77%
1900	2,059	48.84%	1,975	46.85%	182	4.32%
1904	2,089	53.39%	1,605	41.02%	219	5.60%
1908	2,164	51.09%	1,827	43.13%	245	5.78%
1912	1,465	34.12%	1,565	36.45%	1,264	29.44%
1916	2,132	50.22%	1,861	43.84%	252	5.94%
1920	4,344	63.24%	2,323	33.82%	202	2.94%
1924	3,130	48.21%	2,681	41.29%	682	10.50%
1928	4,869	65.26%	2,543	34.08%	49	0.66%
1932	3,660	42.86%	4,775	55.91%	105	1.23%
1936	5,297	52.63%	4,725	46.95%	42	0.42%
1940	6,158	59.23%	4,218	40.57%	21	0.20%
1944	5,151	62.93%	3,020	36.90%	14	0.17%
1948	4,427	54.93%	3,599	44.65%	34	0.42%
1952	6,608	66.19%	3,349	33.55%	26	0.26%
1956	5,473	64.09%	3,066	35.91%	0	0.00%
1960	7,095	72.18%	2,734	27.82%	0	0.00%
1964	4,632	48.25%	4,968	51.75%	0	0.00%
1968	5,631	57.24%	2,763	28.08%	1,444	14.68%
1972	7,253	72.18%	2,795	27.82%	0	0.00%
1976	4,692	46.76%	5,265	52.47%	78	0.78%
1980	7,149	60.06%	4,472	37.57%	282	2.37%
1984	8,204	68.53%	3,767	31.47%	0	0.00%
1988	7,277	62.49%	4,324	37.13%	44	0.38%
1992	5,360	39.60%	5,492	40.57%	2,685	19.83%
1996	5,991	44.30%	5,261	38.90%	2,272	16.80%
2000	9,018	64.07%	4,641	32.97%	416	2.96%
2004	11,097	67.75%	5,118	31.25%	164	1.00%
2008	10,982	64.49%	5,736	33.68%	311	1.83%
2012	11,544	70.62%	4,395	26.89%	407	2.49%
2016	13,893	79.59%	2,881	16.51%	681	3.90%
2020	15,181	81.40%	3,218	17.25%	251	1.35%
2024	15,733	82.94%	3,073	16.20%	162	0.85%

Howell County is, like several rural counties located in the Ozarks, conservative and strongly Republican at the presidential level. Bill Clinton of neighboring Arkansas was the last Democratic presidential nominee to win Howell County in 1992; he lost the county during his 1996 reelection bid and since then, voters in Howell County have decisively backed Republicans. The county historically had a strong Republican bent before then. Clinton, Woodrow Wilson, and Jimmy Carter were the only Democrats in the 20th century to carry the county and not go on to win over 400 electoral votes nationwide. It rejected Franklin D. Roosevelt three times, and was one of the few counties to flip to the GOP in FDR's 46-state landslide of 1936.

Controversy occurred during the course of the 2008 presidential campaign over a billboard displayed near West Plains that depicted a picture of then-Democratic presidential nominee Barack Obama in a turban. Some were offended by the billboard and deemed it racist.

Like most rural areas throughout Southeast Missouri, voters in Howell County generally adhere to socially and culturally conservative principles which tend to influence their Republican leanings. In 2004, Missourians voted on a constitutional amendment to define marriage as the union between a man and a woman—it overwhelmingly won in Howell County with 83.36 percent of the vote. The initiative passed the state with 71 percent of support from voters. In 2006, Missourians voted on a constitutional amendment to fund and legalize embryonic stem cell research in the state—it failed in Howell County with 57.97 percent voting against the measure. The initiative narrowly passed the state with 51 percent of support from voters as Missouri became one of the first states in the nation to approve embryonic stem cell research. Despite Howell County's longstanding tradition of supporting socially conservative platforms, voters in the county have a penchant for advancing populist causes like increasing the minimum wage. In 2006, Missourians voted on a proposition (Proposition B) to increase the minimum wage in the state to $6.50 an hour—it passed Howell County with 67.79 percent of the vote. The proposition strongly passed every single county in Missouri with 78.99 percent voting in favor. (During the same election, voters in five other states also strongly approved increases in the minimum wage.)

=== Missouri presidential preference primary (2008) ===
In the 2008 Missouri Presidential Primary, voters in Howell County from both political parties supported candidates who finished in second place in the state at large and nationally. Former Governor Mike Huckabee (R-Arkansas) received more votes, a total of 2,882, than any candidate from either party in Howell County during the 2008 Missouri Presidential Preference Primary.

== Communities ==
=== Cities ===
- Brandsville
- Mountain View
- West Plains (county seat)
- Willow Springs

=== Census-designated places ===
- Pomona
- South Fork

=== Other unincorporated places ===
- Amy
- Arditta
- Burnham
- Caulfield
- Chapel
- Chapin
- China
- Cottbus
- Crider
- Cull
- Cureall
- Egypt Grove
- Fanchon
- Frankville
- Fruitville
- Grimmet
- Horton
- Hocomo
- Hutton Valley
- Lanton
- Lebo
- Leota
- Moody
- Olden
- Peace Valley
- Pottersville
- Siloam Springs
- Sterling
- Trask

=== Townships ===
- Benton
- Chapel
- Dry Creek
- Goldsberry
- Howell
- Hutton Valley
- Myatt
- Siloam Springs
- Sisson
- South Fork
- Spring Creek
- Willow Springs

== See also ==
- National Register of Historic Places listings in Howell County, Missouri
