= Mountain View, Missouri =

City in Howell County, Missouri, United States

- City
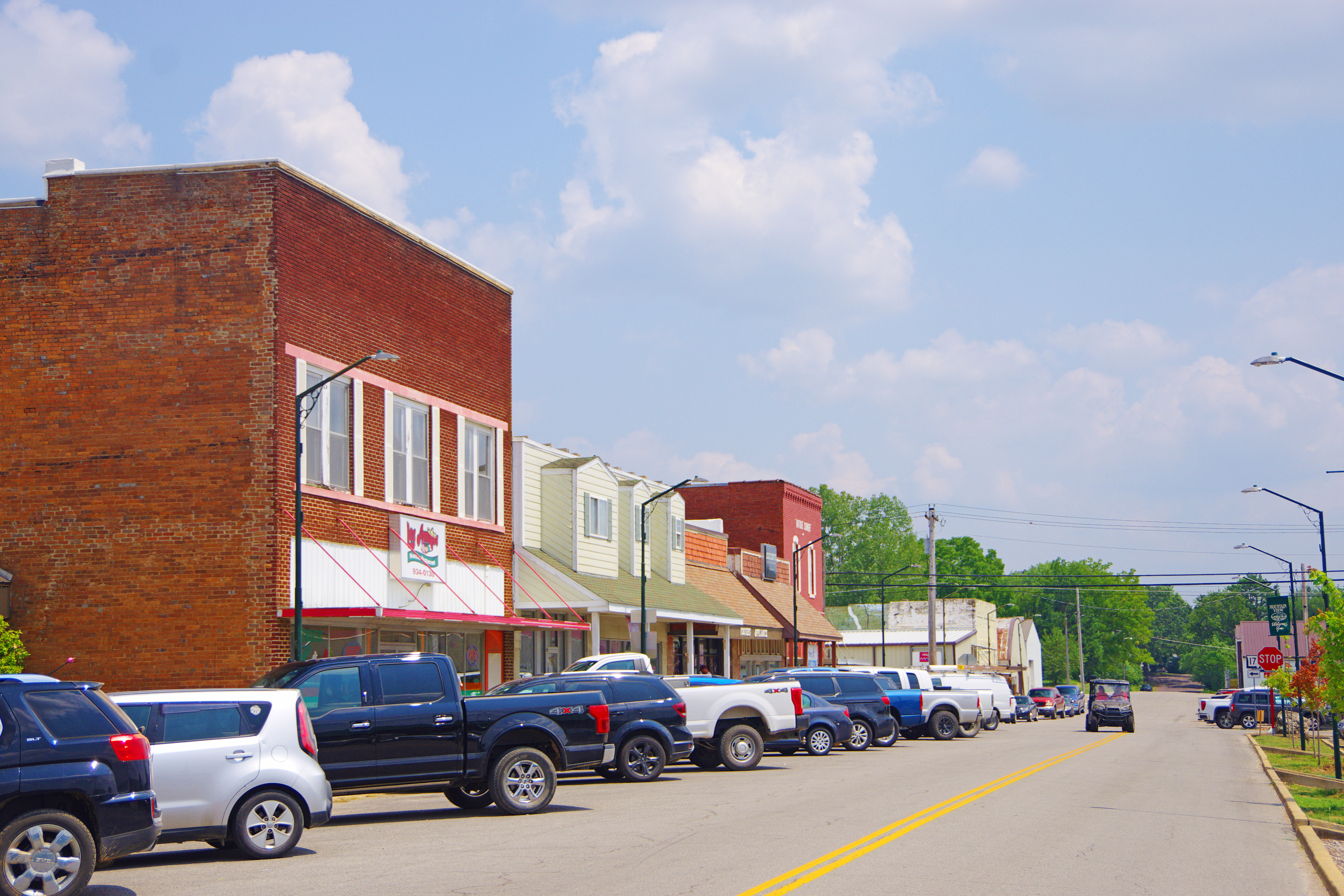
- Businesses along 1st Street (Route 17)

- Location of Mountain View, Missouri
- Coordinates: 36°59′44″N 91°42′3″W
- Country: United States
- State: Missouri
- County: Howell

Area
  - Total: 3.75 sq mi (9.71 km^{2})
  - Land: 3.75 sq mi (9.71 km^{2})
  - Water: 0 sq mi (0.00 km^{2})
- Elevation: 1,125 ft (343 m)

Population (2020)
  - Total: 2,533
  - Density: 675.7/sq mi (260.87/km^{2})
- Time zone: UTC-6 (Central (CST))
  - Summer (DST): UTC-5 (CDT)
- ZIP code: 65548
- Area code: 417
- FIPS code: 29-50438
- GNIS feature ID: 2395135
- Website: City website

Mountain View is a city in northeastern Howell County, Missouri, United States. The population was 2,533 at the 2020 census.

== History ==
Mountain View was platted in 1888, and named for the panoramic views had from the elevated town site. A post office called Mountain View has been in operation since 1879.

== Geography ==
Mountain View is located in the Missouri Ozarks in northeastern Howell County. The city is on US Route 60 approximately 13 miles east of Willow Springs and 11 miles west of Birch Tree in adjacent Shannon County.

According to the United States Census Bureau, the city has a total area of 3.75 square miles (9.71 km^{2}), all land.

=== Climate ===
The climate is humid continental of the warm summer (Köppen: Dfa) or humid subtropical if considering the -3 °C isotherm (Köppen: Cfa). Summers can sometimes be quite hot, but winters are relatively cold. On the 0 °C isotherm is the urban area located on a more southerly plain where you can find of the first climatic type mentioned above in North America (between 36 and 37 °N). The annual average temperature is 55.4 °F (13 °C). July, warmer month has an average of 77.2 °F (25.1 °C) and January the coldest month has an average temperature of 31.5 °F (-0.3 °C), slightly below the freezing point and therefore written with "D" in the climatic scheme. The average annual rainfall falls to 43.8 inches (1113 mm), with the wettest months (4.7 inches or 120 mm) in April and May, and January being the driest (2.2 inches or 55 mm).

=== 2024 tornado ===
On May 26, 2024, a low end EF3 hit the northern side of Mountain View, severely damaging 3 houses and destroying a manufactured home. 1 injury was recorded.

== Demographics ==
Historical population
Census	Pop.	Note	%±
1910	552		—
1920	721		30.6%
1930	783		8.6%
1940	725		−7.4%
1950	892		23.0%
1960	936		4.9%
1970	1,320		41.0%
1980	1,664		26.1%
1990	2,036		22.4%
2000	2,430		19.4%
2010	2,719		11.9%
2020	2,533		−6.8%
U.S. Decennial Census

=== 2020 census ===
As of the 2020 census, Mountain View had a population of 2,533. The median age was 38.8 years. 24.6% of residents were under the age of 18 and 20.4% of residents were 65 years of age or older. For every 100 females there were 85.8 males, and for every 100 females age 18 and over there were 82.6 males age 18 and over.

0.0% of residents lived in urban areas, while 100.0% lived in rural areas.

There were 1,108 households in Mountain View, of which 31.0% had children under the age of 18 living in them. Of all households, 37.3% were married-couple households, 17.6% were households with a male householder and no spouse or partner present, and 36.8% were households with a female householder and no spouse or partner present. About 35.7% of all households were made up of individuals and 19.5% had someone living alone who was 65 years of age or older.

There were 1,248 housing units, of which 11.2% were vacant. The homeowner vacancy rate was 2.9% and the rental vacancy rate was 8.8%.

Racial composition as of the 2020 census
Race	Number	Percent
White	2,292	90.5%
Black or African American	10	0.4%
American Indian and Alaska Native	16	0.6%
Asian	19	0.8%
Native Hawaiian and Other Pacific Islander	3	0.1%
Some other race	17	0.7%
Two or more races	176	6.9%
Hispanic or Latino (of any race)	68	2.7%

=== 2010 census ===
As of the census of 2010, there were 2,719 people, 1,151 households, and 690 families residing in the city. The population density was 725.1 inhabitants per square mile (280.0/km^{2}). There were 1,288 housing units at an average density of 343.5 per square mile (132.6/km^{2}). The racial makeup of the city was 97.57% White, 0.07% Black or African American, 0.51% Native American, 0.33% Asian, 0.04% Native Hawaiian or Pacific Islander, 0.29% from other races, and 1.18% from two or more races. Hispanic or Latino of any race were 1.84% of the population.

There were 1,151 households, of which 31.9% had children under the age of 18 living with them, 42.3% were married couples living together, 12.9% had a female householder with no husband present, 4.8% had a male householder with no wife present, and 40.1% were non-families. 34.2% of all households were made up of individuals, and 18.3% had someone living alone who was 65 years of age or older. The average household size was 2.28 and the average family size was 2.92.

The median age in the city was 39 years. 24.8% of residents were under the age of 18; 9.2% were between the ages of 18 and 24; 22.3% were from 25 to 44; 21.5% were from 45 to 64; and 22.2% were 65 years of age or older. The gender makeup of the city was 45.3% male and 54.7% female.

=== 2000 census ===
As of the census of 2000, there were 2,430 people, 1,051 households, and 649 families residing in the city. The population density was 661.2 inhabitants per square mile (255.3/km^{2}). There were 1,176 housing units at an average density of 320.0 per square mile (123.6/km^{2}). The racial makeup of the city was 95.27% White, 1.07% Native American, 0.29% Asian, 0.08% Pacific Islander, 0.33% from other races, and 2.96% from two or more races. Hispanic or Latino of any race were 1.56% of the population. There were 1,051 households, out of which 28.7% had children under the age of 18 living with them, 47.5% were married couples living together, 12.7% had a female householder with no husband present, and 38.2% were non-families. 35.8% of all households were made up of individuals, and 20.4% had someone living alone who was 65 years of age or older. The average household size was 2.23 and the average family size was 2.88.

In the city the population consisted of 24.7% under the age of 18, 8.3% from 18 to 24, 23.6% from 25 to 44, 20.3% from 45 to 64, and 23.0% who were 65 years of age or older. The median age was 40 years. For every 100 females, there were 79.7 males. For every 100 females age 18 and over, there were 73.7 males.

The median income for a household in the city was $22,308, and the median income for a family was $28,239. Males had a median income of $20,104 versus $17,727 for females. The per capita income for the city was $14,022. About 19.3% of families and 24.3% of the population were below the poverty line, including 41.6% of those under age 18 and 19.8% of those age 65 or over.

== Education ==
Mountain View-Birch Tree R-III School District operates three schools in the city: Mountain View Elementary School, Liberty Middle School, and Liberty Sr. High School.

Mountain View is home to an extension of Southwest Baptist University.

Mountain View has a lending library, the Mountain View Public Library.

== Notable people ==
- Jaelon Acklin, former NFL player for the Baltimore Ravens
- Randle Chowning, singer-songwriter, founding member of the Ozark Mountain Daredevils
- David Glass, former CEO of Walmart

== See also ==
- List of municipalities in Missouri
