= Coco =

Coco or variants may refer to:

== Arts and entertainment ==
=== Film ===
- Coco (2009 film), a French comedy film
- Coco (2017 film), an American animated fantasy film
- Pokémon the Movie: Secrets of the Jungle (Japanese: 劇場版ポケットモンスター ココ, lit. 'Pocket Monsters the Movie: Coco'), a 2020 Japanese anime film
- Kolamaavu Kokila, or CoCo, a 2018 Indian Tamil-language black comedy crime film, directed by Nelson Dilipkumar

=== Music ===
- Coco (music), a style of African-influenced music from northern Brazil
- Coco (musical), a 1969 Broadway show about Coco Chanel
- Coco Records, a 1970s label founded by Harvey Averne
- CoCo (band), a J-pop band
- Co-Co (band), British pop band
- Coco (album), by Colbie Caillat, 2007
- Coco, a 2009 album by Parov Stelar
- Coco (soundtrack), from the 2017 film
- "Coco" (Wejdene song), 2020
- "Coco" (24kGoldn song), 2020
- "Coco" (PewDiePie song), 2021
- "Coco", a song by Foy Vance from the 2016 album The Wild Swan
- "COCO" (song), by Joel Deleōn, 2022
- "CoCo" (O. T. Genasis song), 2014
- "Co-Co" (Sweet song), 1971

=== Literature ===
- Co-co! Magazine, a Hong Kong manga magazine

== Businesses and brands ==
- Coco (perfume), a women's perfume by Chanel
- CoCo, a Lego clone
- CoCo Fresh Tea & Juice, a bubble tea drink franchise based in Taiwan
- CoCo Ichibanya, a Japanese curry restaurant chain
- Coco's Bakery, an American restaurant chain
- Coco, a French-language online chat website
- Vita Coco (Nasdaq: COCO), an American beverage company
- CoCo Key Water Resort, an indoor waterpark chain

== People ==
- Coco (given name), including a list of people and fictional characters with the name or nickname
- Coco (surname), a list of people with the name
- Coco (cartoonist) (born 1982), French cartoonist
- Coco (footballer) (born 1969), Spanish footballer
- Coco the Clown (Nicolai Poliakoff, 1900–1974), Russian-British clown

== Places ==
- El Coco, Coclé, Panama, a corregimiento (district subdivision)
- El Coco, Panamá Oeste, Panama, a corregimiento
- Acoma Pueblo, or Coco, a village and tribe in New Mexico, US
- Coco, West Virginia, US, an unincorporated community
- El Coco, Salinas, Puerto Rico, US, a Special Community
- Coco or Cocos Island (disambiguation)
- Cocó Park, an urban park in Fortaleza, Brazil
- COCO Park, a group of shopping complexes in Shenzhen, China
- Coco River (disambiguation), the name of several rivers
- Cổ Cò River, Vietnam
- 6436 Coco, an asteroid

== Science and technology ==
- COCO (dataset), a dataset for machine-learning research
- Coco (robot), at the Massachusetts Institute of Technology
- CoCo Research Centre, now Centre for Research on Computer-supported Learning and Cognition, University of Sydney, Australia
- TRS-80 Color Computer, nicknamed CoCo

== Transportation ==
- Colorado Connector, nicknamed CoCo, proposed Front Range passenger rail service
- Co-Co locomotive, a locomotive wheel arrangement
- Archambault Coco, a French sailboat design
- USS Coco, a U.S. Navy patrol boat 1917–1919

== Other uses ==
- Coco (folklore), a mythical bogeyman in many Hispano- and Lusophone nations
- Contingent convertible bond (CoCo), in finance
- Kandi Coco, a Chinese electric vehicle
- Coco, coconut palm or coconut
- County council, sometimes abbreviated as CoCo

== See also ==
- Coco Chanel (disambiguation)
- Coco3 (disambiguation)
- Cocoa (disambiguation)
- Coca (disambiguation)
- El Coco (disambiguation)
- Koko (disambiguation)
- Coco/R, a compiler generator
- Zanthoxylum coco, an evergreen tree
