= Koga =

Koga may refer to:

== Places ==
=== Japan ===
- Koga, Ibaraki (古河)
- Koga, Fukuoka (古賀)
- Koga Domain (古河藩)

=== Elsewhere ===
- Koga, a town in Tanzania
- Koga (crater) on Mars

== Other uses ==
- Koga (surname)
- Kōga-ryū, a school of ninjutsu
- Koga clan, Japanese clan
- KOGA (formerly Koga Miyata), bicycle brand from the Netherlands
- Koga Cycling Team, a defunct Dutch cycling team

== Fictional characters ==
- Koga Gō, a character in the Bleach franchise
- Koga, a Fuchsia City gym leader and Elite Four member in the Pokémon universe
- Koga, a ninja dog clan in the manga and anime Ginga: Nagareboshi Gin
- Koga, the name of the ninja clan that trained Firefly in the G.I. Joe universe
- Koga, the leader of the eastern yōkai-wolf tribe in the Inuyasha series
- Bajirisuku: Kōga Ninpō Chō (バジリスク〜甲賀忍法帖〜), the Japanese name for the manga Basilisk by Masaki Segawa
- Koga Ōgami (鳴上嵐, Oogami Koga), a member of UNDEAD in the series Ensemble Stars!

== See also ==
- Koka (disambiguation)
- Kouga (disambiguation)
- KOGA (disambiguation)
