= Coco (given name) =

Coco is a given name and nickname used by women and men. It may refer to:

== Women with the name ==
- Coco (cartoonist) (Corinne Rey, born 1982), French cartoonist
- Coco Love Alcorn, Canadian singer
- Coco Argentée (born 1982), Cameroonian singer-songwriter
- Coco Austin (born 1979), American model and spouse of Ice-T
- Coco Brandolini d'Adda (born 1979), French-born Italian fashion director
- CoCo Brown (born 1978), American rapper
- Coco Chanel (1883–1971), French fashion designer
- Coco Rebecca Edogamhe (born 2001), Italian actress
- Coco Fusco (born 1960), American artist
- Coco Gauff (born 2004), American tennis player
- CoCo Goodson (born 1990), American soccer defender
- Coco Guzmán (born 1979), Spanish artist
- Coco Hayashi (born 2002), Japanese actress
- Coco Ho (born 1991), professional Hawaiian surfer
- Coco Jem Holiday, African-American drag queen
- Coco Jones (born 1998), American pop singer
- Coco Jumbo, Australian performer
- Coco Khan (born 1988), British freelance writer
- Coco Lee (1975–2023), Hong Kong-American pop singer
- Coco Lin (born 1995), Hong Kong fencer
- Coco Lindelauf (born 2001), French rugby union player
- Coco Marusix (born 1964), Peruvian drag queen and vedette
- Coco Mbassi (born 1969), Cameroonian musical artist
- Coco Mellors (born 1989), British writer
- Coco Miller (born 1978), American Women's National Basketball Association player
- Coco Montrese (born 1974), American drag queen
- Coco Moodysson (born 1970), Swedish auto biographer
- Coco O. (born 1987), Danish musician
- Coco Rocha (born 1988), Canadian model
- Coco Solid (born 1979), New Zealand musician and writer
- Coco Star (born 1974), English singer-songwriter
- Coco Arayha Suparurk (born 1994), Thai-Austrian model and beauty pageant titleholder
- CoCo Vandeweghe (born 1991), American tennis player
- Coco Yoshizawa (born 2009), Japanese skateboarder

== Men with the name ==
- Coco (footballer) (born 1969), Spanish footballer
- Coco Crisp (born 1979), American baseball outfielder
- Coco Ferrer (1915–1963), Puerto Rican baseball player
- Coco Hotahota (1941–2020), French Polynesian dancer
- Coco Johnsen (born 1966), American Playboy model and fashion designer
- Coco Laboy (born 1940), Puerto Rican baseball player
- Coco Legrand (born 1947), Chilean comedian and actor
- Coco Martin (born 1981), Filipino actor
- Coco Montes (born 1996), American baseball player
- Coco Montoya (born 1951), American guitarist
- Coco Peredo (1938–1967), Bolivian communist
- Coco Robicheaux (1947–2011), American musician
- Coco Schumann (1924–2018), German musician
- Coco weAfrica (born 1991), Zimbabwean artist
- Enrique "Coco" Vicéns (1926–2015), Puerto Rican basketball player and politician
- Grégoire Aslan (né Krikor Aslanian; 1908–1982), Swiss-Armenian actor and musician
- Joey Diaz (born 1963), American-Cuban comedian

== Fictional characters with the name ==
- Coco Bandicoot, from the video game series Crash Bandicoot
- Coco Hernandez, from the TV series Fame
- Coco Wexler, from Zoey 101
- Coco, from the American cartoon series Foster's Home for Imaginary Friends
- CoCo, in the anime series Boku no Pico
- Coco, from the manga series Toriko
- Coco, in Tintin in the Congo
- Coco, great-grandmother of protagonist Miguel in the Pixar animated movie Coco (2017 film)
- Coco, a character from Bluey
- Coco, in the 2020 series Pikwik Pack
- Coco Schoppenboer, a character from the Dutch indie animated show Ongezellig
- Coco Rivington, a character from the 2007 film I'm Not There

== See also ==
- Coco (surname)
