= Koka =

Koka or Kōka may refer to:

- Ahmed Hassan Mahgoub, an Egyptian football player known as Koka.
- Kōka, a Japanese era name
- Kōka, Shiga, Japan, a city created in 2004
  - Kōka, Shiga (town), Japan (dissolved and replaced by the city)
  - Kōka District, Shiga, Japan (dissolved and replaced by the city)
- Kōka (効果), a type of award point in the judo rules
- Kóka, a village in Hungary
- Koka, Eritrea, a community in Eritrea
- USS Koka, U.S. Navy ships
- Koka (brand), a brand of instant noodles
- Koka Reservoir, a man-made lake in Ethiopia
- Rock-cut tombs
- Koka Subba Rao, Chief Justice of Supreme Court of India
- KOKA, a radio station serving the Shreveport-Bossier City metropolitan area
- Klava Koka, a Russian singer born 1996
- Koka Booth (1932–2023), American politician and mayor of Cary, North Carolina

== See also ==
- Koga (disambiguation) – The Japanese place name Kōka is alternatively pronounced Kōga
- Coka (disambiguation)
- Coca (disambiguation)
