= Sparta B.V. =

Dutch bicycle manufacturer

- Sparta logo.svg

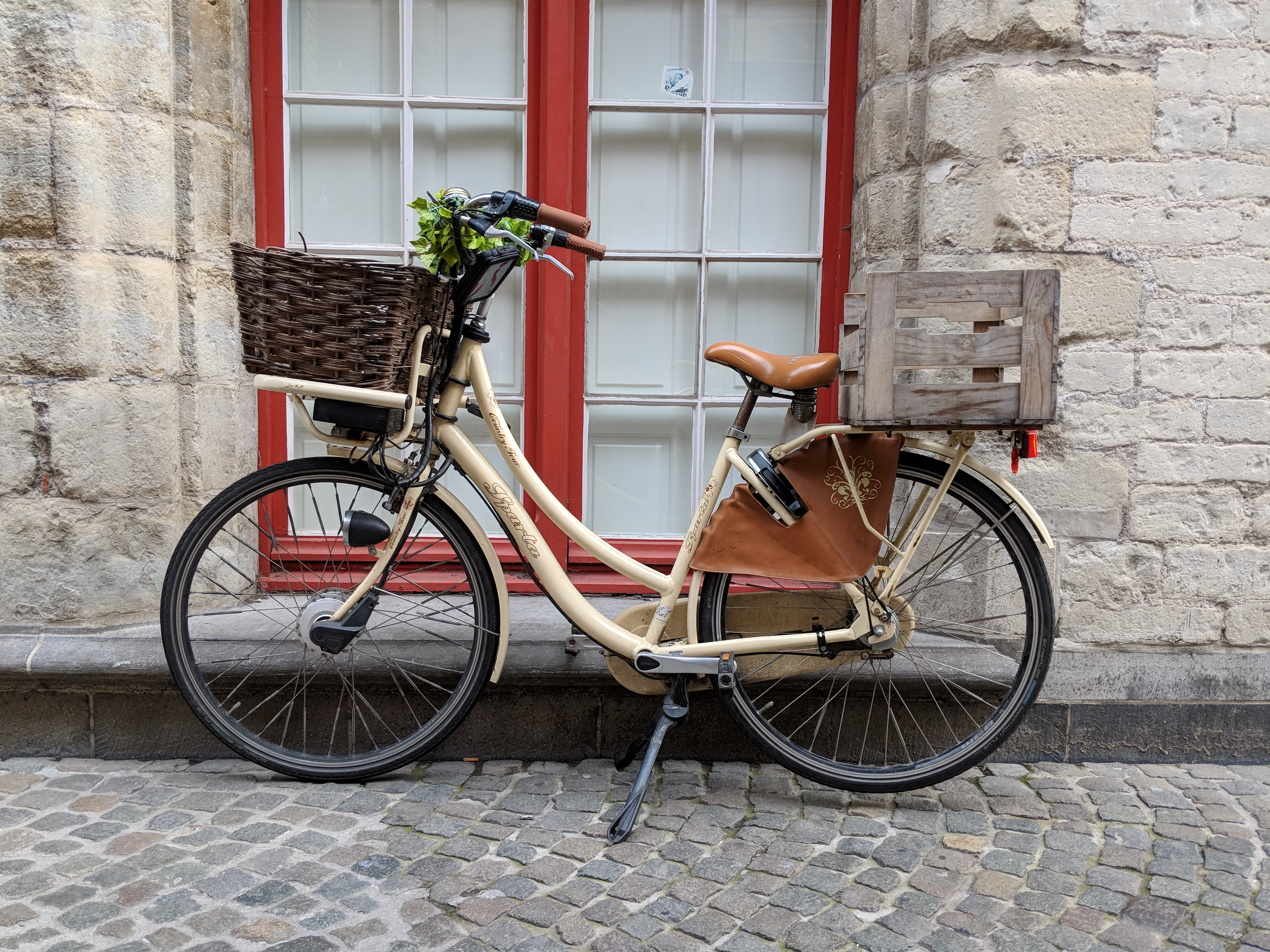
- Sparta bike in Bruges
- Formerly: Verbeek & Schakel (1917); Sparta Rijwielen- en Motorenfabriek, Firma Verbeek & Schakel (1931); Sparta Rijwielen- en Motorenfabriek BV (1945)
- Industry: Bicycles, mopeds, motorcycles
- Founded: 1917 in Apeldoorn, Netherlands
- Founders: A. Verbeek; D.L. Schakel; L. Krijgsman
- Headquarters: Wilmershof 44J, Apeldoorn, Netherlands
- Area served: Western Europe; Germany
- Key people: A. Verbeek; D.L. Schakel; Jan Wilke
- Products: Sparta M Series; Sparta S Series; Sparta G Series
- Owner: Accell Group
- Website: (in Dutch and German) Sparta.nl

Sparta B.V. is a Dutch bicycle manufacturer based in Apeldoorn that also produced motorcycles and Mopeds. It is the largest electrical bike manufacturer in Europe.

Sparta was founded in 1917, and has been producing bicycles ever since. Highlights of Sparta's history are the company becoming the biggest Dutch manufacturer of motorcycles after the Second World War, and becoming the biggest Dutch manufacturer of mopeds in the 1970s. In the current age Sparta is known for the production of E-bikes.

== History ==
=== 1910s: Foundation ===
During World War I three men in the neutral Netherlands founded what would become the biggest moped manufacturer of the Netherlands. The gentlemen Schakel, Verbeek and Krijgsman opened their wholesale named Verbeek & Schakel in the Hoofdstraat (Main street) of Apeldoorn. Later that same year they bought the brands Sparta, Romein (Roman) and Vaandel (Ensign). These brands were used for the cycles they sold. Krijgsman quit the company in 1918.

=== 1920s: Leendert Schakel ===
The 1920s meant rapid development for Sparta: Leendert Schakel became head of the company after buying full ownership from all other shareholders, leaving him and Verbeek as the owners. In 1920, Sparta produced its first self-built cycle. The year after which the company started working on cargo bikes, which, in the beginning were powered manually. Later in the 1920s the company equipped their cargo bikes with engines. In 1925 Verbeek's share of the company was bought by Schakel, who had great ideas for the company. Two years later, in 1927, he bought land on the Waterloseweg in Apeldoorn, where he built a factory for the production of bicycles, milk carts, transport- and cargo bikes.

=== 1930s: Motorisation ===
The 1930s company, then called Sparta Rijwielen- en Motorenfabriek, Firma Verbeek & Schakel, started producing motorised vehicles. Technics were a big passion of Schakel, so the change from bicycle to motorcycle was a logical one. The first motorised vehicle to leave the factory was equipped with a 78cc Sachs engine. Its development started in 1931.

Sparta was still active on the bicycle market. In a brochure printed in 1936 were, aside of four regular bikes for men and women, adverts for a kids bicycle, a cargo bike, a butcher's bike (baker's bike), a tandem and a service bike. All of these had over fifteen different styles and modifications, several of which had the option of being equipped with an engine. The offer in motorcycles also was enlarged. In the 30s, Sparta produced several models equipped with engines made by Villiers, Sachs and JLO, all of which were 120 or 125 cc. Sparta wanted to make sure that its vehicles didn't weigh over sixty kilos (132 lbs), which made it to where a Dutch consumer didn't have to pay taxes over the vehicle.

=== 1940s: World War II ===
As a result of the Second World War production was halted in 1943, after which the company had to be rebuilt, to resume productions in 1945. Producing vehicles, however, wasn't easy for Sparta, as there was a scarcity in metals.

Schakel, who still was head of the company, saw a broad future in the motorcycles. The limitation to 60 kilos, which Sparta limited itself to, was discarded. By 1949 the company had managed to attract designer Jan Wilke to join the company. Wilke gave the motorcycles a telescopic front fork, new frame, and along with that a fresh, new and typical look. By 1950 Sparta achieved the typical look for its post-war motorcycles, consisting of a large fuel tank and integrated storage for tools. Along with that, Sparta equipped motorcycles with new engines produced by Villers. From there on, Sparta grew to become the biggest moped manufacturer of the Netherlands.

=== 1950s: Mopeds ===
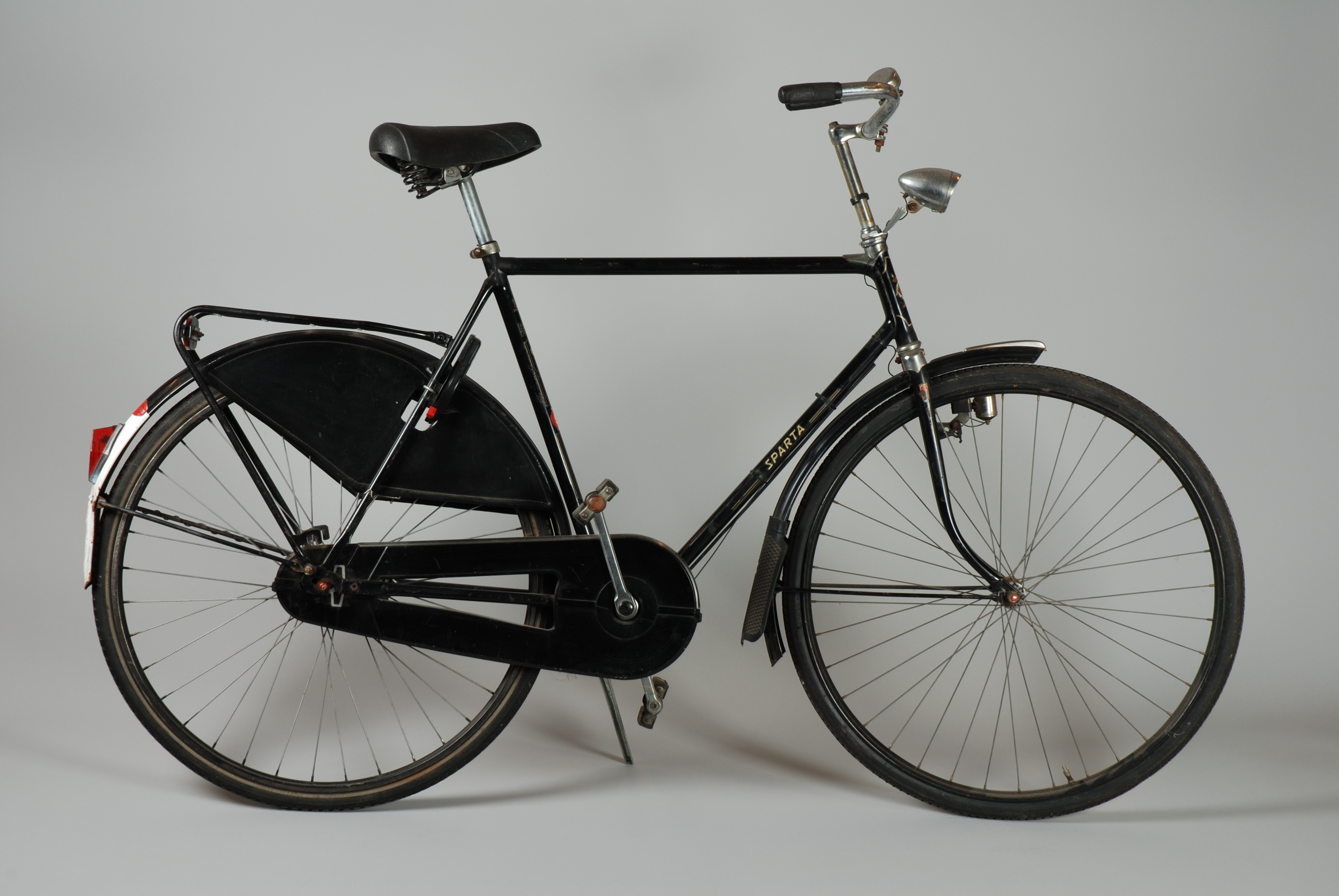

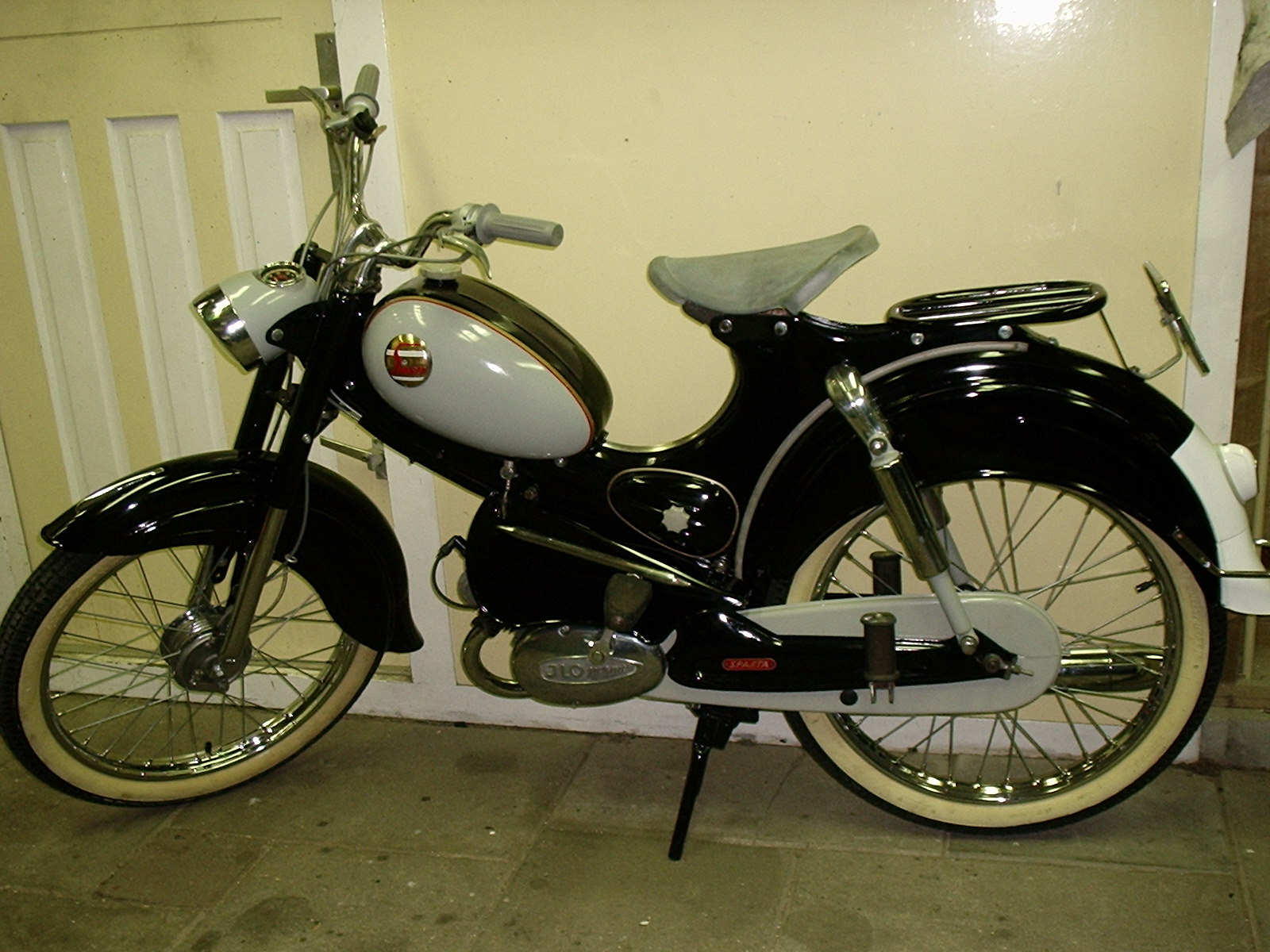
Sparta GB50 (1958)

In the 1950s Sparta played a huge role in filling the demand for motorised bicycles. The name had been changed once again, this time dropping the names of the two main founders, leaving the name to be Sparta Rijwielen- en Motorenfabriek. From the fifties on Sparta expanded their offer in motorised vehicles, offering not only motorcycles but also mopeds.

In 1958 Sparta halted the production of motorcycles, as it wasn't profitable any longer. Instead, the moped was starting to grow more and more popular. This change made the company focus entirely on mopeds. Export to other European countries and other countries such as Indonesia, Tahiti, Africa and North America created large profits for the company. Being the biggest Dutch moped manufacturer, Sparta had many product lines, which all sold in high quantities.

One of the more popular mopeds by Sparta was the MA 50. The moped was often referred to as verpleegstersbrommer (nurse moped), as the model was mostly used by nurses. The first MA50 was produced and sold in 1958. The 1959 version of the MA50 got a facelift, and was sold as the MB50. The last newly built M-Series moped was sold in 1962, after having had another facelift, now going by the name of MC50.

=== 1960s: Tube frame ===
In the 1960s Sparta introduces the bike with tube frame, the plans of which took two years to design. The model name 8-80 was chosen to reflect the age of the target audience.

1965 was the best year of Sparta's moped sales. Around 47,000 mopeds were sold that year, all of which were produced by the mere 380 people working in the Sparta factory. In 1967 chose to start producing bicycles again, which ended up to be a clever decision, as eight years later, in 1975 the helmplicht, which stated that everyone that drove a moped had to wear a helmet, was introduced in the Netherlands; the country which still had the most customers of Sparta mopeds. Sparta would continue producing mopeds up to and including 1982, when it started to focus on bicycles only.

=== 1970s: Sparta bike frame ===
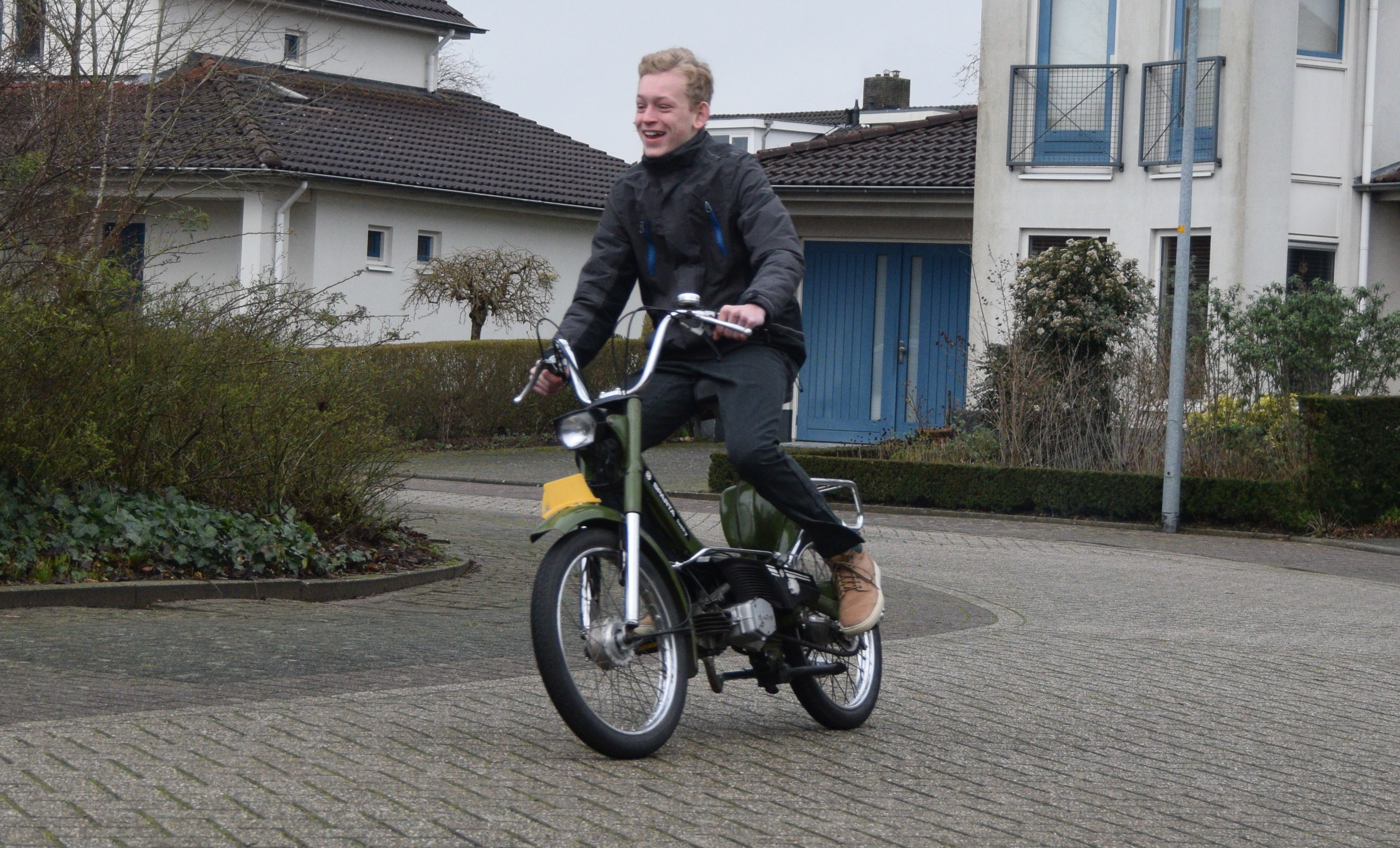
Boy driving a Sparta Lucky (1973, photo of 2016)

By 1973 Sparta was back on the bike market with its own Sparta-frame. The idea of which was a single frame with one tube going from the steering head to rear brake. This frame would be used in bikes for roughly twenty years, no matter what person the bike would be meant for, man, woman or kid, their bikes would have similar frames. The bikes were sold by Sparta itself, and through grey routes. This meant that companies would sell Sparta bikes under their own brand without mentioning the company that originally created the bicycle. Examples of these were Wellington, Halfords, Resident and Tomos. Even nowadays these bikes can be found in almost every Dutch bike rack. The sales in Denmark grew in large amounts around this time, where Sparta sold bicycles under the name Skandsen. Sparta stuck to its own name when selling in other countries, including Germany and Belgium. The many sales of the company made it re-establish its place on the bicycle market.

=== 1980s: Focus on bicycles ===
Sparta sold its last moped in 1982, as the market for mopeds had not been profitable for several years. The production of motorcycles was halted twenty-two years earlier, in 1960, yet the idea of motorised vehicles hadn't completely left Sparta's mentality. Sparta gave motorising bicycles a last shot, which meant a cooperation with German motorcycle manufacturer Sachs. Together they manufactured the Spartamet, a bicycle with auxiliary motor. The Spartamet entered the market in 1986, and turned out to be a massive success. By 1990 20,000 of the 105,000 bicycles sold were a Spartamet. The Spartamet made Sparta to be the only Dutch manufacturer of mopeds with auxiliary motors. Competitors did try to create rivals of the Spartamet, but their products never stuck with the public.

Ties with Sachs increased in the following years. Sparta used increasingly more of their products on its bicycles. One of these products were Sachs' coaster brakes, which were traditionally manufactured by Sturmey-Archer. Sparta became the Dutch importer of ATB and racing bicycles made by Sachs' subsidiary company Hercules by late 1989.

=== 1990s: Electric bikes ===
In September 1999 Sparta stopped the production of the Spartamet, as bicycles with electrical auxiliary motors replaced the need of bicycles such as the Spartamet, which required fuel. Later that same month, on the 28th, Sparta announces that it will be a part of Accell Group, where it will function as a subsidiary company, joining other Dutch bicycle manufacturer Batavus.

Sparta, who was dubbed the inventor of the bicycle of electric auxiliary motor on the Dutch market introduced the Pharos-series, which was meant to fill the newly created demand for bicycles with electrical auxiliary motors. The Pahros-series were created using an electrical system developed by Yamaha. In 1999 Sparta started producing recumbent bicycles, which made it the second largest company making recumbent bicycles, with the largest being Batavus.

=== 2000s: Accell Group ===
With Sparta joining Accell Group in 1999, several changes were made to the products that Sparta made. It quit manufacturing recumbent bicycles, children's bikes and ATBs, and moved to its current location on Wilmersdorf, Apeldoorn, the Netherlands in the summer of 2001. New products made by Sparta included the Amazone, introduced in 2000, which was a bike aimed at mothers. In 2003 Sparta launched ION, a series of systems for E-bikes. The ION system led Sparta to become the biggest E-bike manufacturer in Europe.

== Gallery ==
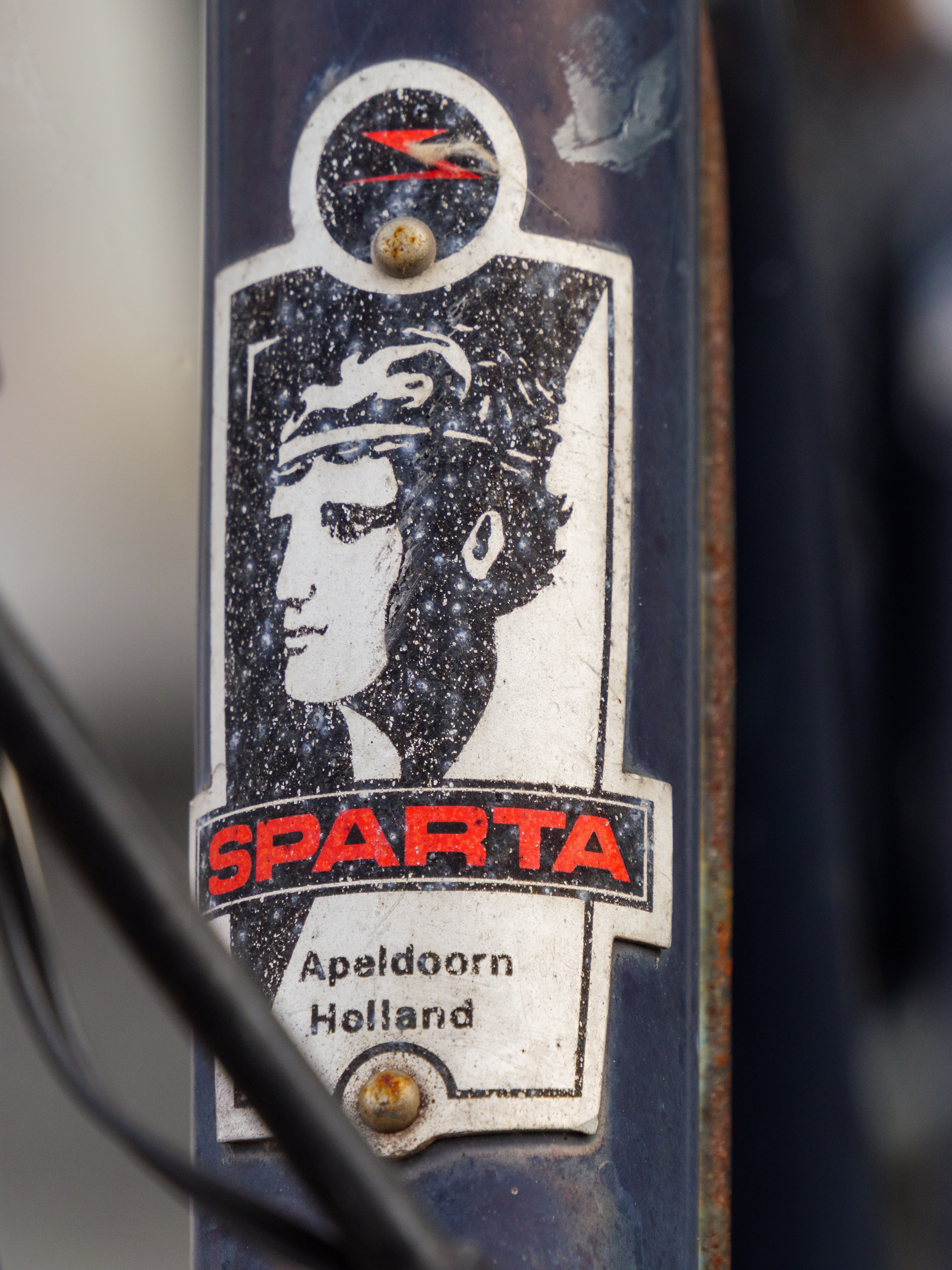

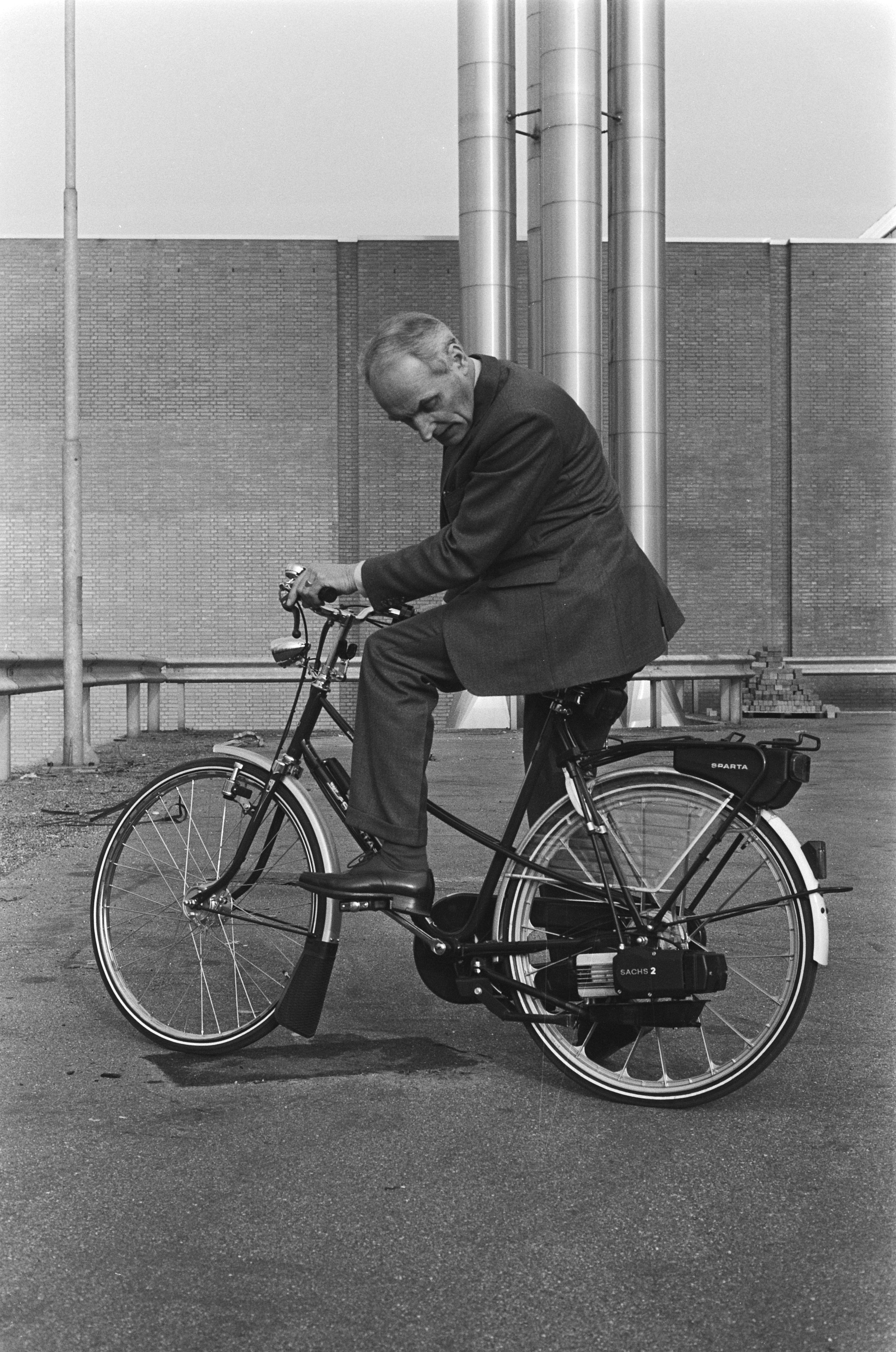

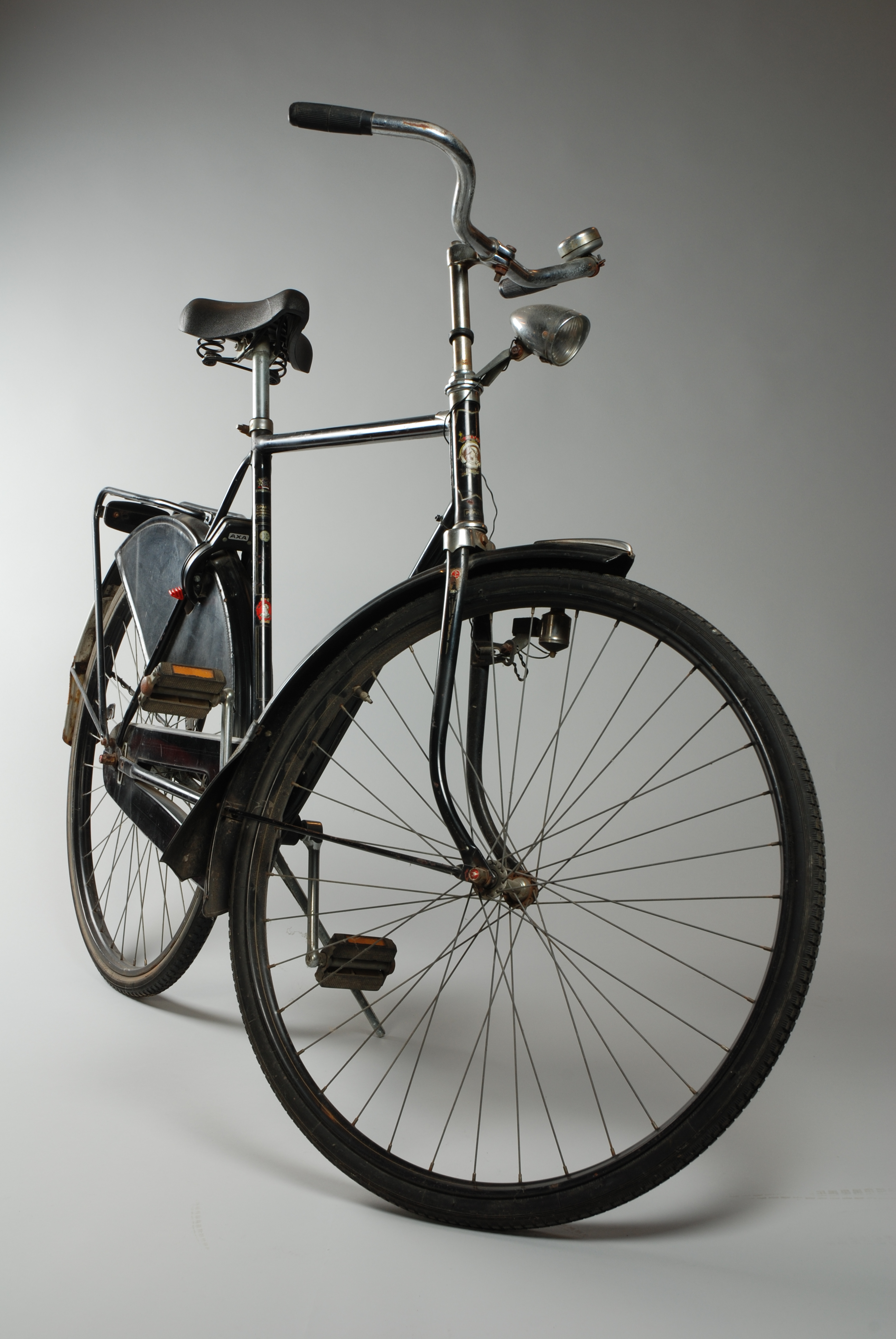

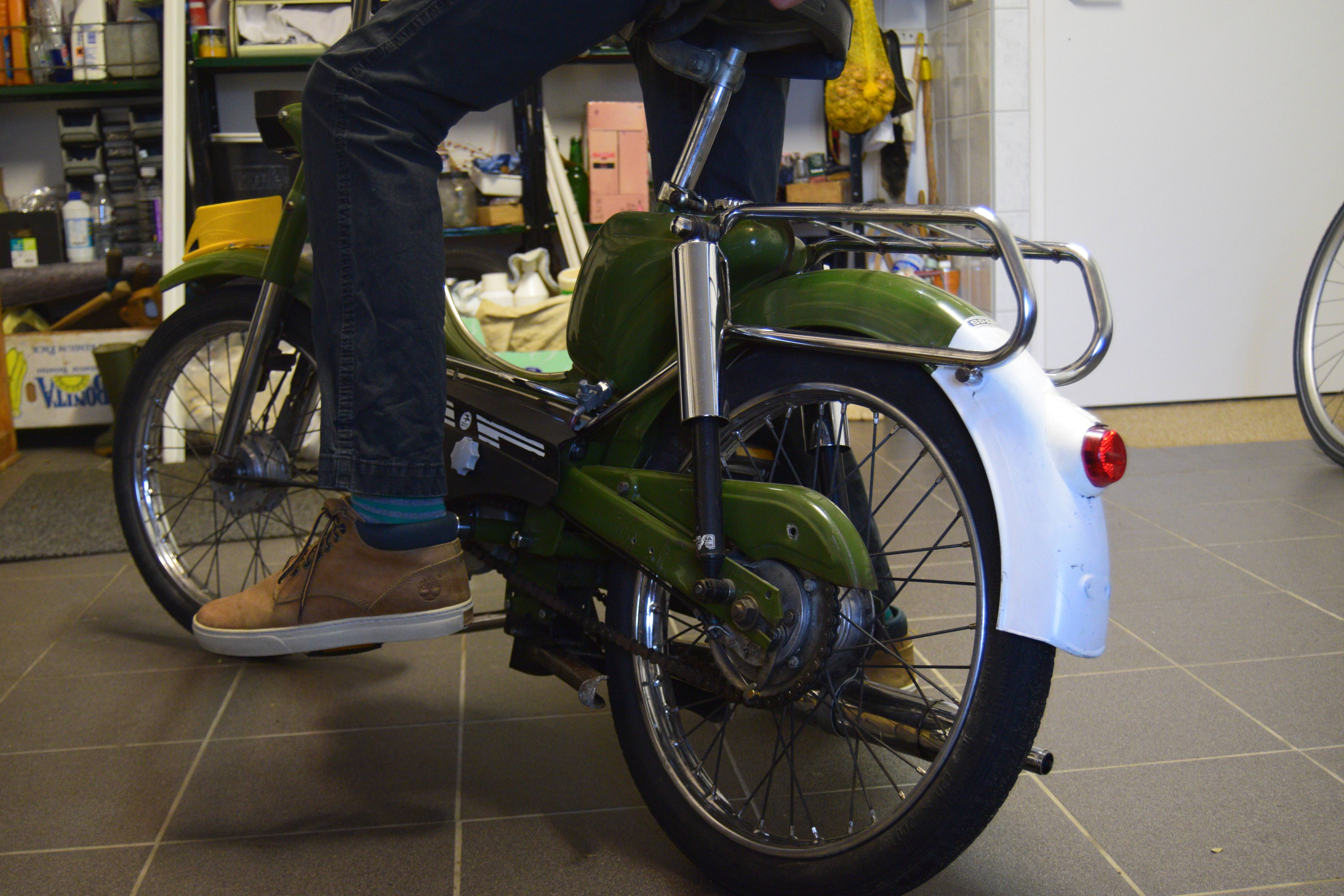

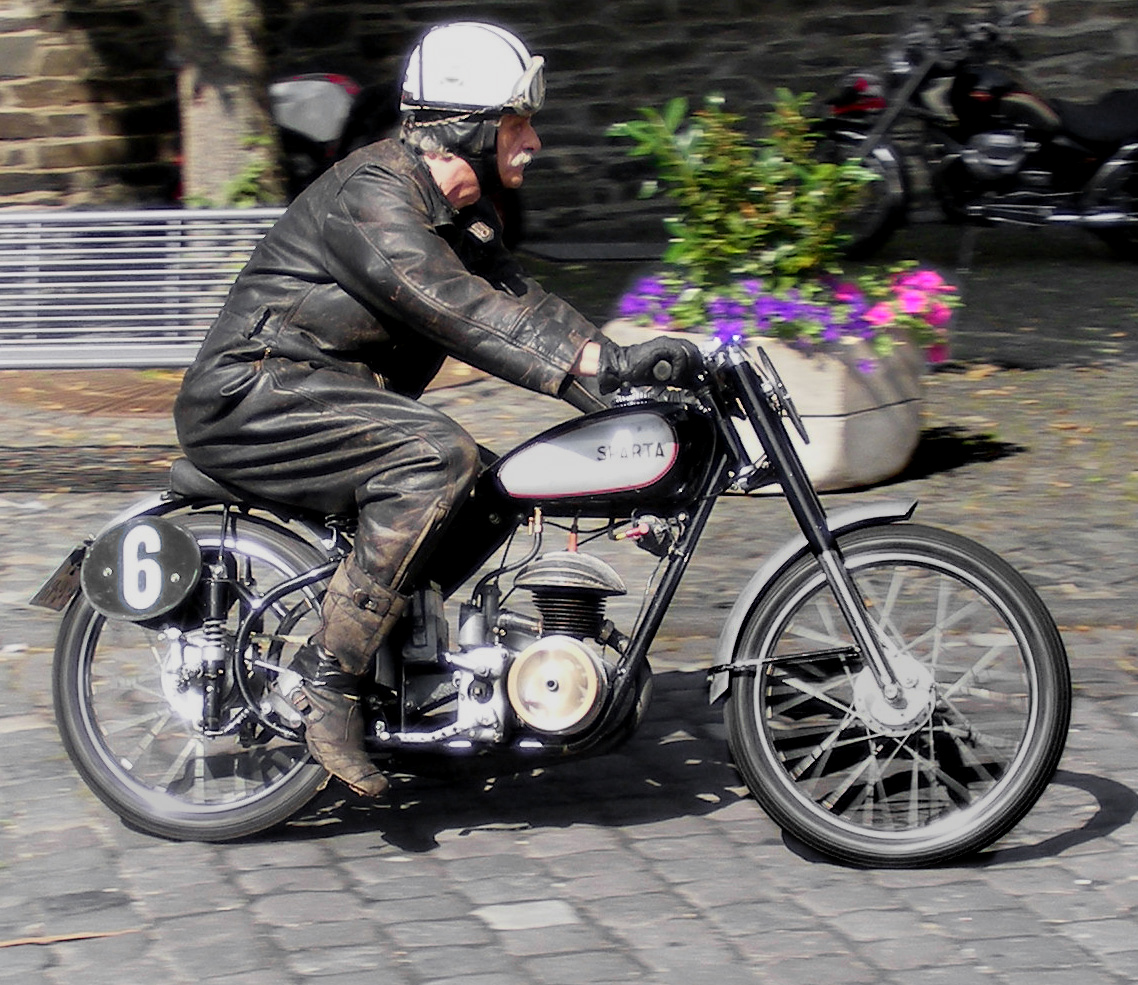

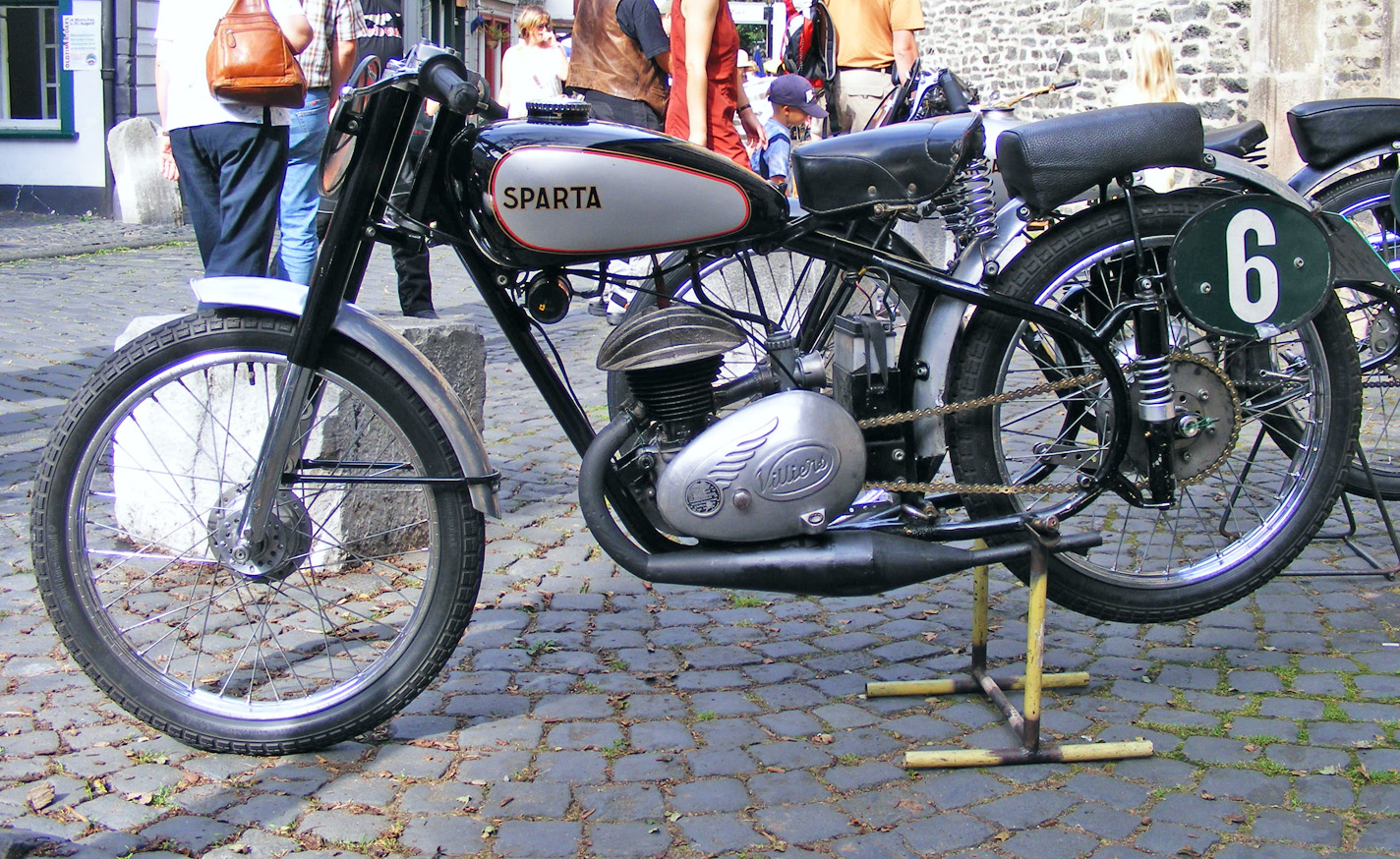

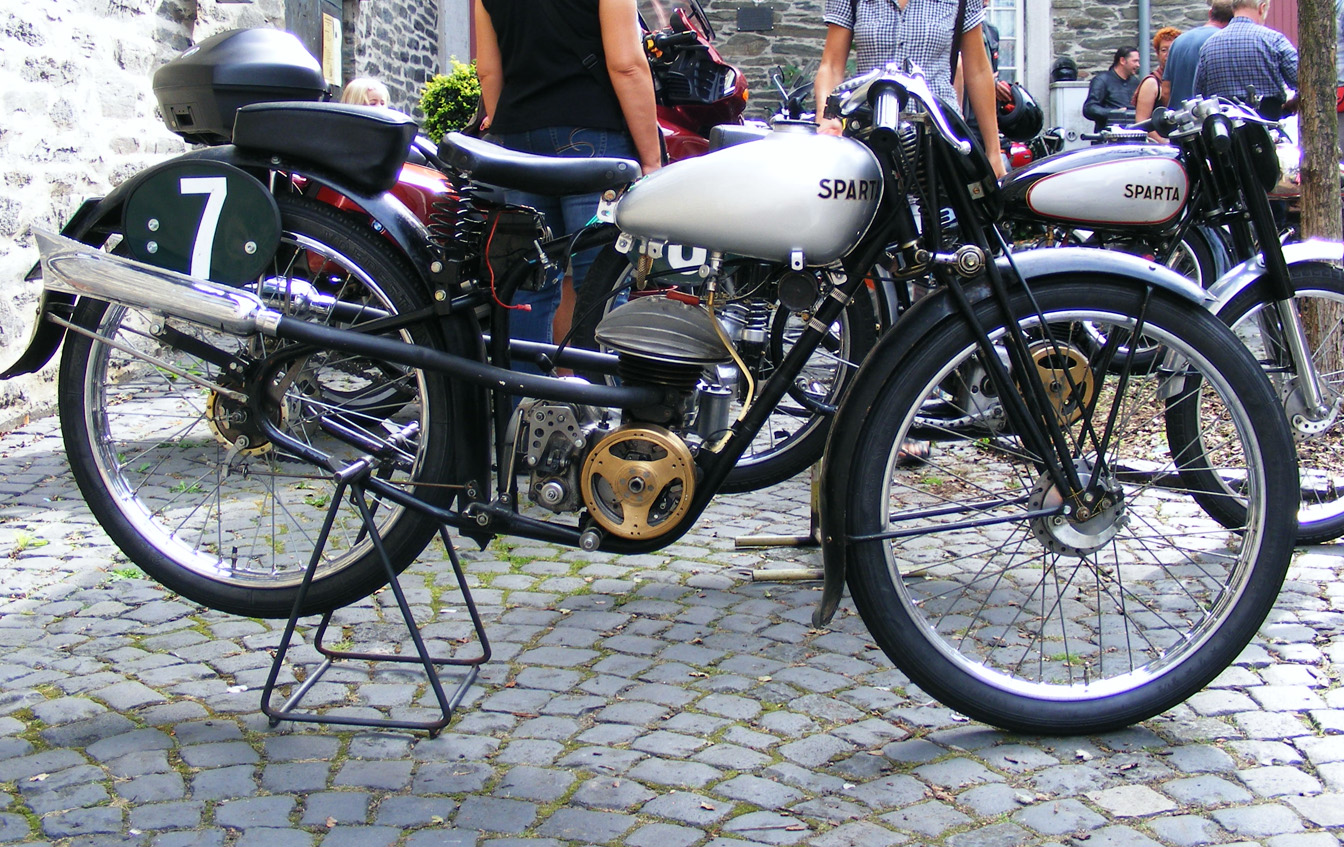

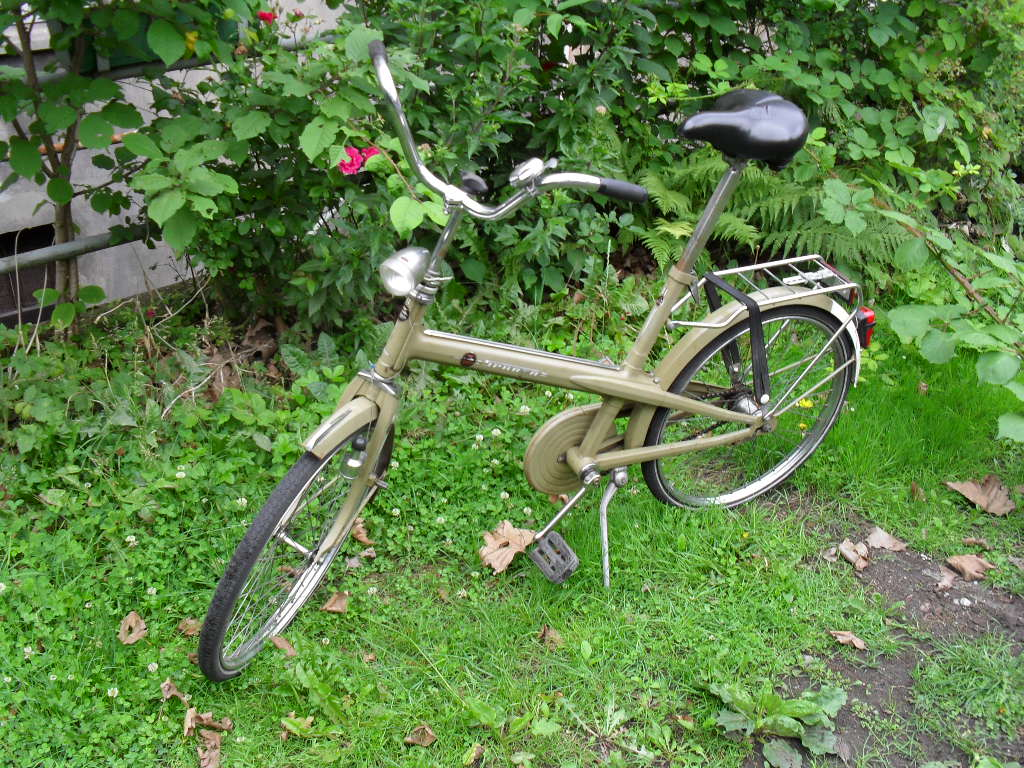

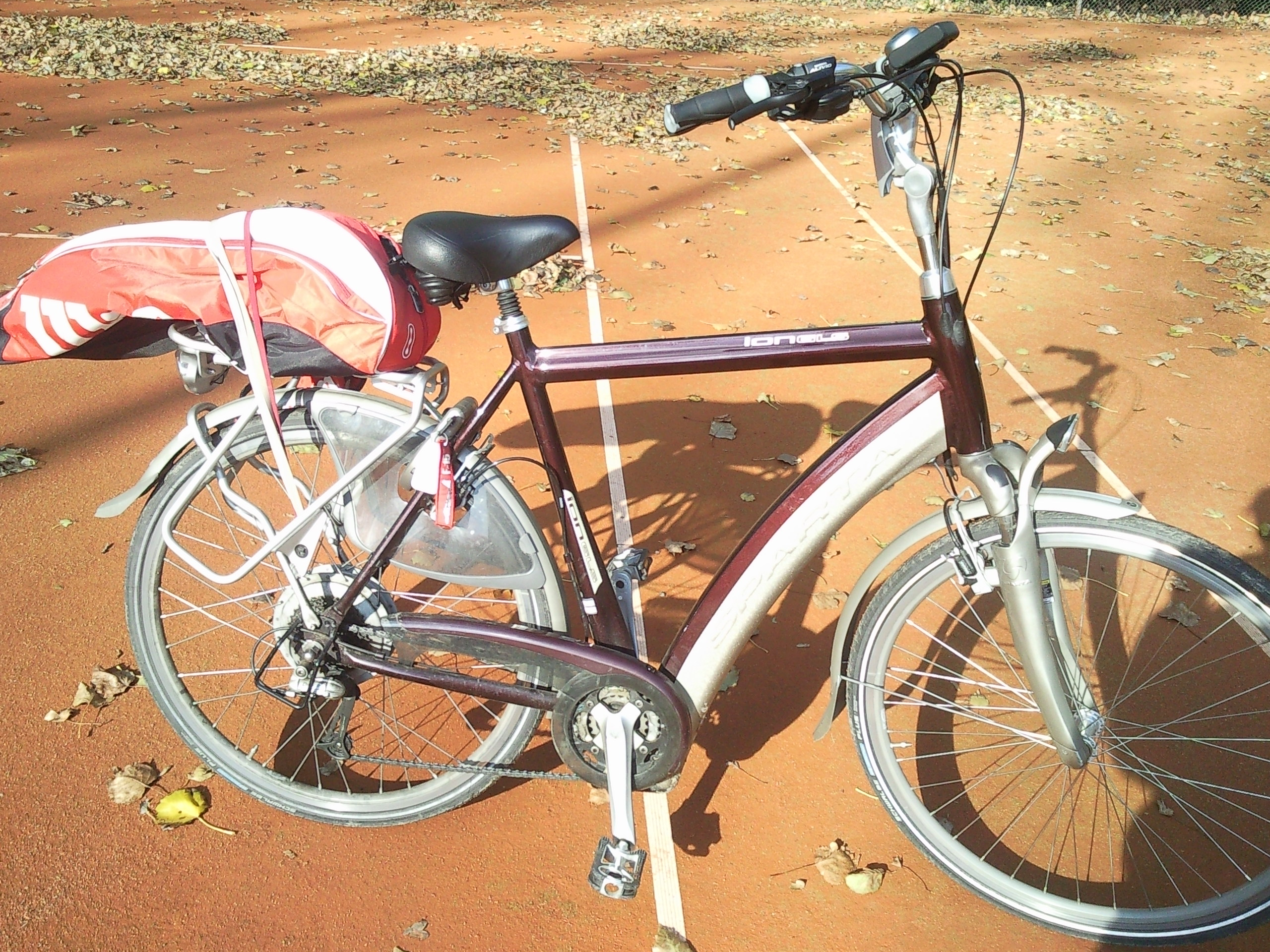
