= Cacau (disambiguation) =

Cacau may refer to:

- Cacau (born 1981), Claudemir Jerônimo Barreto, Brazilian-born German football striker
- Cacau (novel), by Brazilian writer Jorge Amado

== See also ==
- Cocoa (disambiguation)
- Cacao (disambiguation)
- Cacau Protásio (born 1975)
