= Atala (company) =

Italian manufacturer of bicycles

Atala spa
- Trade name: Atala
- Type: Joint-stock company
- Industry: Bicycle industry
- Founded: 1907; 119 years ago in Milan, Italy
- Founder: Angelo Gatti
- Headquarters: Monza, Italy
- Area served: Worldwide
- Products: Scooters; E-bike; Bicycles
- Parent: Accell Group
- Subsidiaries: Carraro Cicli, Whistle Bikes, Maino and Umberto Dei
- Website: atala.it

Atala spa is an Italian manufacturer of bicycles and exercise equipment. It was founded in 1907 by Angelo Gatti and has its headquarters in Monza, Italy.

== History ==
The company was started by Angelo Gatti in 1907 and formally incorporated in Italy in 1921 by Cesare Rizzato.

It is notable for its racing bicycles, winning several championships in the early 20th century. The company won some championships in the 1980s before experiencing financial difficulties. Part of the company was sold in 2002. Now 50% of the company is owned by the Accell Group.

The company also produces bicycles for the brands Atala, Carraro Cicli, Whistle Bikes, Maino and Umberto Dei. The company won victories in the past years with the Atala Team.

== Models ==
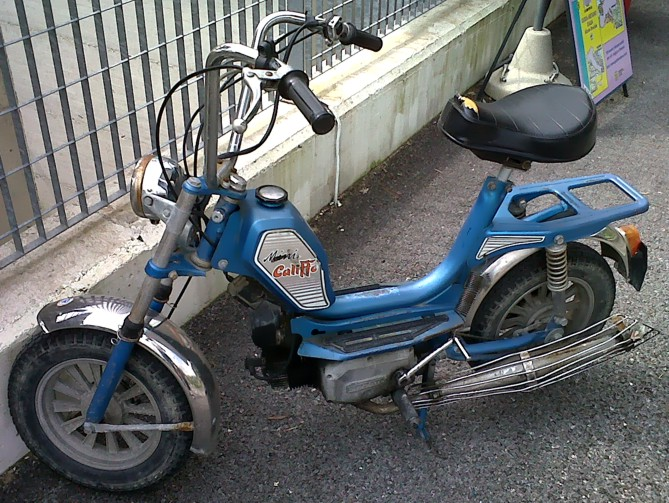
Mini Califfo

Street: SLR, SLR100, Outdoor, Norhtblack, Time out

- Trekking: Distance, River, Discovery, Street, Travel, Bridge
- Urban : Manhattan, Primavera, Città, Cruiser, Life, Venture, Airon, Maggie, Piccadilli, president
- MTB: Shape D, Shape V, Spin, Planet D, Planet V, Wap, Replay, Stratos, My Flower, Cobra, Diablo, Dragon, Scorpion
- Electric bicycle: E-Green, EcoLife, Ecofolding, EcoCity
- Cid'z bikes
- Folding Bikes

The company produces several models for the Carraro Cicli, Whistle Bikes, and Maino e Umberto Dei brands.

== Components ==
The company produces "Byte" bicycle parts which are used in several models of the brand.

== See also ==
- List of bicycle parts
