= Cocoa solids =

Cocoa solids may refer to:

- Total cocoa solids, the sum of all components derived from the cocoa bean
- Non-fat cocoa solids, the cocoa components remaining after the cocoa butter has been removed, primarily found in defatted cocoa powder
- Chocolate liquor (or cocoa mass), the ground paste made from cocoa beans, containing both non-fat cocoa solids and cocoa butter in roughly equal proportions

== See also ==
- Cocoa (disambiguation)
