= Cacao =

Cacao may refer to:

== Plants ==
- Theobroma cacao, a tropical evergreen tree
  - Cocoa bean, the seed from the tree used to make chocolate
  - Cacao beverage, a drink made from the seeds
  - Cacao paste, ground cacao beans. The mass is melted and separated into:
    - Cocoa butter, a pale, yellow, edible fat; and
    - Cocoa powder, a brown powder, extracted from the cacao bean

== Places ==
- Cacao, French Guiana
- Cacao, Carolina, Puerto Rico
- Cacao, Quebradillas, Puerto Rico
- Cacao Alto, Patillas, Puerto Rico
- Cacao Bajo, Patillas, Puerto Rico
- Hacienda Cacao, Yucatán, Mexico

== Other uses ==
- Maria Cacao, a mountain goddess in the Philippines

== See also ==
- Chocolate
- Cacau (disambiguation)
- Cocoa (disambiguation)
- Coca (disambiguation)
- Kakao, a Korean conglomerate named after the cacao seed
