= Koga (surname) =

Koga (written: 古賀), Kōga, Kouga or Kohga is a Japanese surname. Notable people with the surname include:

- Akira Koga (古賀 輝; born 1994), Japanese badminton player
- Aoi Koga (古賀 葵; born 1993), Japanese voice actress
- Atsushi Koga (rugby union) (古賀 淳; born 1993), Japanese former rugby union player
- Harue Koga (古賀 春江; 1895–1933), Japanese painter active in the Taishō period
- Hide Koga, nickname of Hidehiko Koga (古賀 英彦; 1899–1982), Japanese baseball player
- Hiroyasu Koga (古賀 浩靖; born 1947), Yukio Mishima's kaishakunin
- Issaku Koga (古賀 逸策; 1899–1982), often written as Issac Koga, Japanese inventor and scientist
- Issei Koga (古賀 一成; born 1947), Japanese politician from Democratic Party of Japan
- Junya Koga (古賀 淳也; born 1987), Japanese swimmer
- Kazunari Koga (古賀 一成; born 1972), Japanese former footballer
- Koichiro Koga (古賀 幸一郎; born 1984), Japanese volleyball player
- Makoto Koga (古賀 誠; born 1940), Japanese Liberal Democratic Party politician
- Manabu Koga (古賀 学; 1935–1974), Japanese swimmer
- Mary Koga (1920–2001), Japanese-American photographer and social worker in Chicago
- Masahiro Koga (古賀 正紘; born 1978), Japanese former footballer
- Masao Koga (古賀 政男; 1904–1978), Japanese composer, guitarist and pop musician
- Masato Koga (古賀 将之; born 1970), former Japanese football player
- Masayuki Koga (古賀 正人), Japanese shakuhachi player in USA
- Michiko Koga (古賀 美智子; born 1986) is the former stage name of F Chopper Koga (FチョッパーKOGA), Japanese bass player
- Mineichi Koga (古賀 峯一; 1885–1944), fleet admiral during World War II
- Minoru Koga (古賀 穂; born 1996), Japanese badminton player
- Mitsuki Koga (虎牙 光揮; born 1975), actor in martial arts films
- Nobuaki Koga (古賀 伸明; born 1952), Japanese unionist
- Sarina Koga (古賀 紗理那; born 1996), Japanese volleyball player
- Satoshi Koga (古賀 聡; born 1970), Japanese footballer
- Seiji Koga (古賀 誠史; born 1978), Japanese footballer
- Shuntaro Koga (古賀 俊太郎; born 1998), Japanese footballer
- Tadayoshi Koga (古賀忠義; 1922–1942), pilot of the Akutan Zero in World War II
- Taichirō Koga (古賀 太一郎; born 1989), Japanese volleyball player
- Taiyo Koga (古賀 太陽; born 1998), Japanese football player
- Takahiro Koga (古賀 貴大; born 1999), Japanese football player
- Takeshi Koga (古賀 武; born 1939), retired Japanese judoka
- Takuma Koga (古賀 琢磨; born 1969), Japanese former footballer
- Takuma Koga (racing driver) (古賀 琢麻; born 1977), Japanese stock car racing driver
- Toru Koga (古賀 徹; born 1967), a Japanese mixed martial artist
- Toshihiko Koga (古賀 稔彦; 1967–2021), a judo world champion
- Toshinori Koga (古賀 俊憲; born 1948), Japanese boxer
- Victor Koga (1935–2018), Japanese-Russian martial artist
- Yukiko Koga (born 1969), anthropologist
- Yun Kōga (高河 ゆん; born 1965), Japanese manga artist
- Yūsei Koga (古賀 悠聖; born 2001), Japanese shogi player
