= KOGA (disambiguation) =

KOGA may refer to:

- KOGA (AM), a radio station (930 AM) licensed to Ogallala, Nebraska, United States
- KOGA-FM, a radio station (99.7 FM) licensed to Ogallala, Nebraska, United States
- KOGA, a Dutch bicycle manufacturer
