= Cocoa Exchange =

Cocoa Exchange may refer to:

- New York Cocoa Exchange, a former commodity futures exchange where cocoa was bought and sold
- Coffee, Sugar and Cocoa Exchange, created by the merger of the New York Cocoa Exchange and New York Coffee and Sugar Exchange
- 1 Wall Street Court, a building in Manhattan where the New York Cocoa Exchange had its trading floor and offices
- London Commodity Exchange, which merged to become London International Financial Futures and Options Exchange

== See also ==
- Cocoa (disambiguation)
- List of commodities exchanges
