= El Coco (disambiguation) =

El Coco may refer to:

- Coco (folklore), or El Coco, a mythical ghost-like monster or bogeyman
- El Coco, Coclé, Panama, a township
- El Coco, Panamá Oeste, Panama, a township
- El Coco, Salinas, Puerto Rico, a township
- El Coco, recording artists for AVI Records

== See also ==
- Coco (disambiguation)
- Aeropuerto Internacional el Coco, now Juan Santamaría International Airport, Costa Rica
