= Kouga =

Kouga may refer to:

- Kouga Local Municipality, a municipality in South Africa
- Kouga Mountains, a mountain range in South Africa
- Kouga River, a river in South Africa
- Kōga-ryū, often spelled Kouga-ryuu, a school of ninjutsu
- Koga (InuYasha), sometimes spelled Kouga, a character from the manga and anime series InuYasha
- Kouga, a set of characters in the novel The Kouga Ninja Scrolls

== See also ==
- Koga (disambiguation)
