= Accell =

Dutch bicycle manufacturer

Accel Group Holding B.V.
- Type: Private
- Industry: Bicycle industry
- Predecessor: ATAG Holding
- Founded: 1998; 28 years ago
- Defunct: August 11, 2026
- Headquarters: Heerenveen, Netherlands
- Key people: Jonas Nilsson (CEO); Tjeerd Jegen (Chairman)
- Products: Bicycles, e-bikes, cargo bikes, bicycle parts and accessories
- Revenue: ▼€1.294 billion (2023)
- Operating income: ▼ –€13 million (2023)
- Net income: ▼ –€390 million (2023)
- Number of employees: 3,000 (2021)
- Parent: Kohlberg Kravis Roberts
- Website: www.accell-group.com

Accell Group Holding B.V. was a Dutch bicycle company based in Heerenveen, Netherlands. The company is a leader in the European e-bike market and owns a large portfolio of bicycle brands including Batavus, Babboe, Haibike, Koga, Lapierre, Raleigh, and Sparta.

== History ==
Previous logo of Accell

=== 1998–1999: Foundation ===
Accell Group was established in 1998, following a split from its parent company, ATAG Holding. ATAG Holding had acquired the Dutch bicycle manufacturer Batavus in 1986 and expanded its bicycle division with the acquisition of other brands. In 1998, the decision was made to divest the bicycle activities into a separate entity, leading to the formation of Accell Group, which was subsequently listed on the Euronext Amsterdam stock exchange.

=== 2000s and 2010s: Expansion ===
Over the years, Accell Group grew through the acquisition of several well-known bicycle manufacturers, including Raleigh in 2012 and the Dutch cargo bike specialist Babboe in 2018. The company also established a strong presence in the e-bike segment, with brands like Haibike pioneering the e-mountain bike category.

In May 2017, Accell Group officially rejected an €845 million takeover bid from its Dutch rival Pon Holdings, concluding that the offer did not sufficiently reflect the company's future value.

The company expanded significantly in North America, but faced challenges. In 2017, the loss of a contract to sell bicycles through Dick's Sporting Goods contributed to significant financial losses for its North American division. In August 2019, Accell restructured its North American operations by selling its brands Diamondback, Redline and IZIP to Regent, LP.

=== 2020s: Bankruptcy ===
In January 2022, it was announced that Accell Group would be acquired by the American investment firm Kohlberg Kravis Roberts (KKR) in a deal valued at approximately €1.56 billion. The acquisition was completed in August 2022, and Accell Group was delisted from the Euronext Amsterdam stock exchange.

Following the acquisition, Accell Group was impacted by a severe industry downturn. In 2023, revenues declined to €1.294 billion, and the company reported a net loss of €390 million, which included €344 million in one-off costs related to obsolete stock, restructuring, and a major product recall of its Babboe cargo bikes.

In October 2024, Accell Group announced an agreement with its creditors to reduce its debt by approximately €600 million, from €1.4 billion to €800 million. The company also worked to normalize its inventory, successfully reducing its stock of finished bikes from a peak of 340,000 in late 2023 to 169,000 by November 2024.

In February 2026, Accell group announced a refinancing agreement. This refinancing agreement will transfer the shareholding to "existing super senior lenders".

The company's British operation had made redundancies in 2024 and in January 2025 reported losses of £30m. In August 2026, Accell said it had "exhausted all the available options", was "no longer able to meet its financial obligations" and had begun insolvency proceedings.

== Brands ==
- Comfort and urban mobility:

- Batavus: A historic Dutch brand known for its city and traditional bicycles.
- Sparta: A Dutch brand with a strong focus on e-bikes.
- Koga: A premium Dutch brand known for high-quality, handmade touring and trekking bikes, often winning design awards.
- Raleigh: A historic British bicycle manufacturer.
- Winora: A German brand focused on city and family bikes.

- Sport and performance:

- Lapierre: A French manufacturer of road and mountain bikes. Starting in January 2025, Lapierre returns to the UCI World Tour as the bike sponsor for Team Picnic PostNL.
- Haibike: A German brand that is considered a pioneer of the e-mountain bike (e-MTB), having introduced the first Haibike XDURO model in 2010.
- Ghost: A German brand offering a wide range of mountain and e-mountain bikes.

- Cargo and family:

- Babboe: A Dutch brand specializing in cargo bikes.
- Carqon: A premium cargo bike brand.

- Other brands:
  - Van Nicholas: A Dutch brand specializing in titanium-framed bicycles.
  - Loekie: A Dutch brand focused on children's bicycles.
  - Tunturi: A Finnish brand with a history in both fitness equipment and bicycles.
  - Nishiki: A brand with roots in Japan, now primarily sold in the Nordic countries.
- Parts and accessories

- XLC: Accell's European brand for bicycle parts and accessories.

== Controversies ==
=== Babboe Cargo Bike Recall ===
In February 2024, Accell Group's brand Babboe was ordered by the Netherlands Food and Consumer Product Safety Authority (NVWA) to halt all sales due to serious safety risks from potential frame breakages. The NVWA accused the company of having failed to investigate numerous reports of breakages. This led to a large-scale recall of several cargo bike models and had a significant financial impact on the company.
