= Yukiko Koga =

- Born: 1969 (age 56–57)

Academic background
- Education: Keio University (LL.B.); Syracuse University (MA); Columbia University (PhD)
- Thesis: The Double Inheritance: The Afterlife of Colonial Modernity in the Cities of Former 'Manchuria' (2008)

Academic work
- Discipline: Anthropologist
- Institutions: Hunter College; Yale University

Yukiko Koga (born 1969) is an anthropologist teaching at Yale University. She previously taught at CUNY's Hunter College. She specializes in legal anthropology, urban space, post-colonial & post-imperial relations, history & memory, and transnational East Asia (China and Japan).

== Education ==
Koga was a postdoctoral scholar in East Asian Studies at Brown University, specializing in colonial and post-colonial culture of occupied regions like Manchuria and other parts of mainland China directly after World War II. She received a National Endowment for the Humanities grant to complete this work.

Koga is the author of the book, Inheritance of Loss: China, Japan, and the Political Economy of Redemption After Empire (University of Chicago Press, 2016). In 2017, Koga won the American Anthropological Association’s Francis L. K. Hsu and Anthony Leeds Book Prizes.

She currently serves on the editorial collective of the Rice University journal positions: asia critique.

== Awards ==
- 2018–2019 Princeton University Law and Public Affairs (LAPA) Scholar
- 2018 Hunter College Presidential Award for Excellence
- 2017 Francis L. K. Hsu Book Prize
- 2017 Anthony Leeds Book Prize
