= Coca (disambiguation) =

Coca may refer to any of the four cultivated plants which belong to the family Erythroxylaceae.

== Food and drink ==
- Coca (pastry), a typical Catalan pizza-like dish
- Coca Colla, a Bolivian soft drink that contains extract of the coca leaf
- Coca flour, a dietary supplement made from the ground leaves of the coca plant
- Coca Sek, a short-lived carbonated drink from Colombia that contained coca
- Coca tea, a beverage made from coca leaves
- Coca wine or Mariani wine is an alcoholic wine made from the coca plant
- Coca-Cola, an internationally marketed soft drink
- Coca Cola Corporation, an Atlanta, Georgia company

== Music ==
- Coheed and Cambria, a rock band often called "CoCa" by fans
- Concerto Copenhagen or Concerto Copenhagen, an orchestra based in Copenhagen, Denmark

== People ==
=== Given name ===
- Coca Andronescu (1932–1998), Romanian actress
- Coca Crystal (1947–2016), American television personality and activist
- Coca Guazzini (born 1953), Chilean actress
- Coca Michelle (born 1995/96), British nail artist
- Isabel Sarli (1929–2019), nicknamed "Coca", Argentine actress

=== Surname ===
- Agustín de Luque y Coca (1850–1937), Spanish military general and politician
- Arthur F. Coca (1875–1959), American immunologist
- Diego Coca (born 1994), Salvadoran footballer
- Eugen Coca (1893–1954), Moldovan-Soviet composer and violinist
- Hassan de Zé Cocá (born 1969), Brazilian politician
- Imogene Coca (1908–2001), American actress
- Juan Coca (born 1993), Puerto Rican footballer
- Valentin Coca (born 1987), Romanian footballer

== Places ==
- Coca de Alba, a town in Salamanca, Spain
- Coca River, a river in Ecuador
- Coca (Slănic), a river in Romania
- Coca, Segovia, a town in Segovia, Spain
- Pizzo Coca, the highest point of Bergamo Alps, Italy
- Coca, a village in Călinești-Oaș Commune, Satu Mare County, Romania
- Coca Antimirești and Coca Niculești, villages in Vintilă Vodă Commune, Buzău County, Romania
- Coca, an alternative name for the city of Puerto Francisco de Orellana, Ecuador
- Coca Cola Airport, in Benton County, Oregon
- Coca Museum, covers the history of the coca plant from the Andean region and related drug cocaine
- Center on Contemporary Art, Seattle, Washington
- Centre of Contemporary Art, Christchurch, New Zealand
- Qoqah, a river in Ethiopia

== Other ==
- Centre of Contemporary Art (CoCA), curated art gallery in New Zealand
- C.O.C.A. or Conference On Crack and Cocaine, British charity
- Coca eradication, a controversial part of the United States' War on Drugs policy
- Coca people, an indigenous people of the Mexican state of Jalisco
- Commission on Osteopathic College Accreditation, abbreviated "COCA"
- Corpus of Contemporary American English, abbreviated "COCA"

== See also ==
- Cacao (disambiguation)
- Coco (disambiguation)
- Koka (disambiguation)
