= KOGA =

Bicycle maker

- Type: Private
- Industry: Bicycles
- Founded: 1974
- Headquarters: Heerenveen, Netherlands
- Key people: Andries Gaastra (founder)
- Products: Bicycle and Related Components
- Website: koga.com

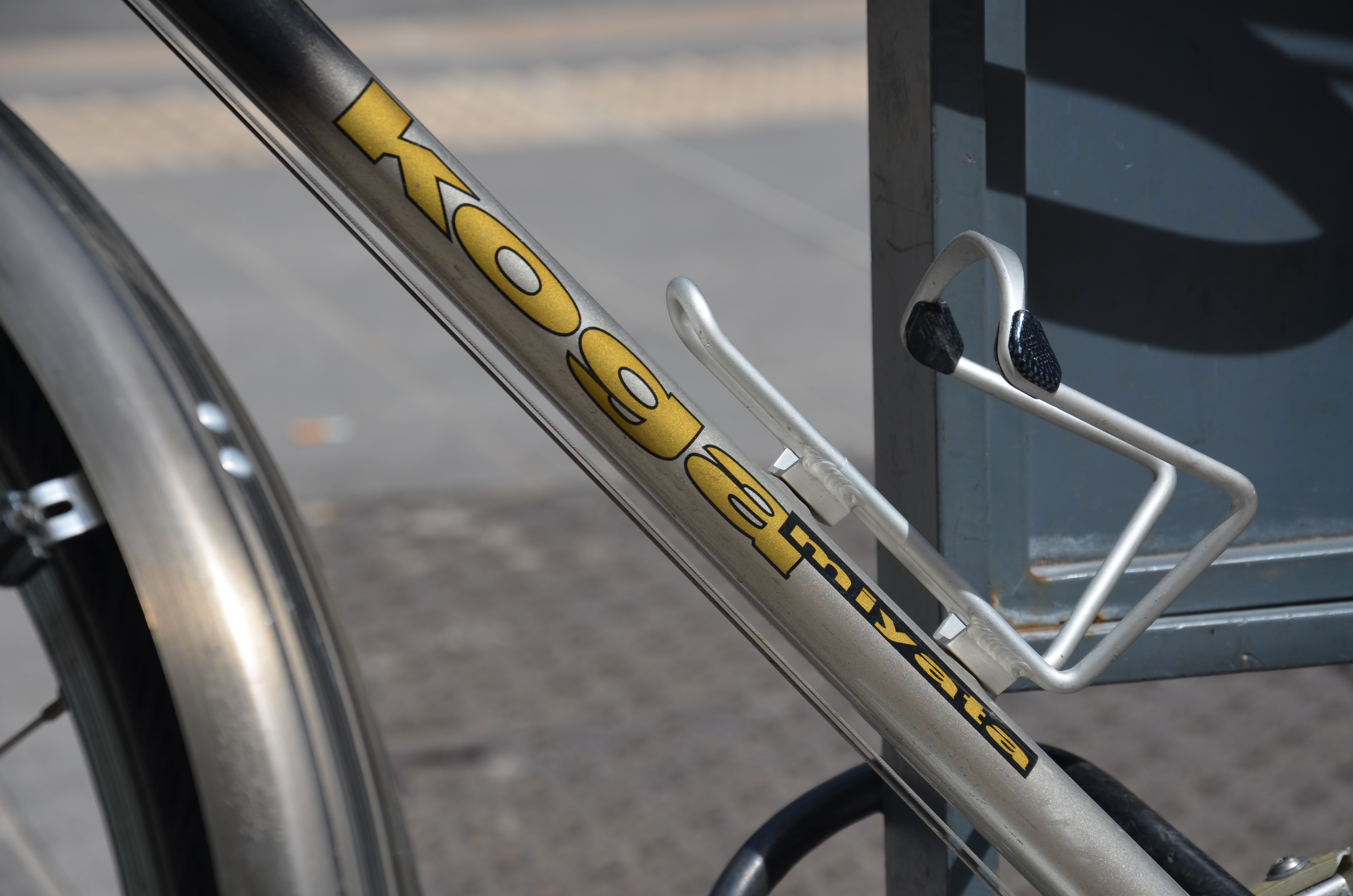
Koga Miyata bicycle

KOGA is a Dutch bicycle manufacturer based in Heerenveen, Netherlands. The company is known for its long time partnership with Japanese frame manufacturer Miyata, producing bicycles and sponsoring racing teams under the brand name Koga Miyata. The partnership ended in May 2010 and the company began manufacturing bicycles under the KOGA brand.

== History ==
The company was founded by Dutch mechanic Andries Gaastra in 1974, who had left his position at his father's company Batavus. The name Koga is a combination of his surname and that of his wife Marion Kowallik. The addition of Miyata came from the cooperation with Japanese manufacturer Miyata. Koga Miyata relied on Japanese components from manufacturers such as Shimano.

From 1980 Koga Miyata sponsored the IJsboerke cycle team which a year later changed their main sponsor to Capri-Sun. Dutch rider of that team, Peter Winnen, won the 1981 Tour de France 17th stage on the Alpe d'Huez and the white jersey of the best young rider. The next Tour he won the 17th stage towards Morzine, leading to wider recognition. In 1991-1992, Koga Miyata was subsponsor of Tulip Computers and also main sponsor of an amateur team, which would be a good development team for the professionals.

In 1992, Gaastra sold his company to the Atag Cycle Group, which had acquired Batavus six years earlier.

KOGA is owned by the Accell Group since 1998.

== Products ==
Koga Miyata started with the use of Japanese components. The design and assemblage of the bicycles was done by hand in the Netherlands.

At first Koga Miyata only produced racing bicycles. In 1976 they added a range of randonneurs or touring bicycles, and in 1986 mountain bikes. In 1993, after it was acquired by the Atag Cycle Group, Koga Miyata also produced hybrid bicycles.

Up from the 2020this Koga produce a range of e-bikes (bicycles with an electrical assist system), city bikes and road-racing bikes. They have also started producing a line of gravel bikes. Additionally, Koga track bikes have seen some success with the 'Koga Kinsei' frame claiming a gold medal at the UEC European Track Championships.

Koga bikes are especially known for assembling their bikes by hand, and for "smooth welded" aluminium frames; nearly all Koga bikes have their welds smoothed out before painting.

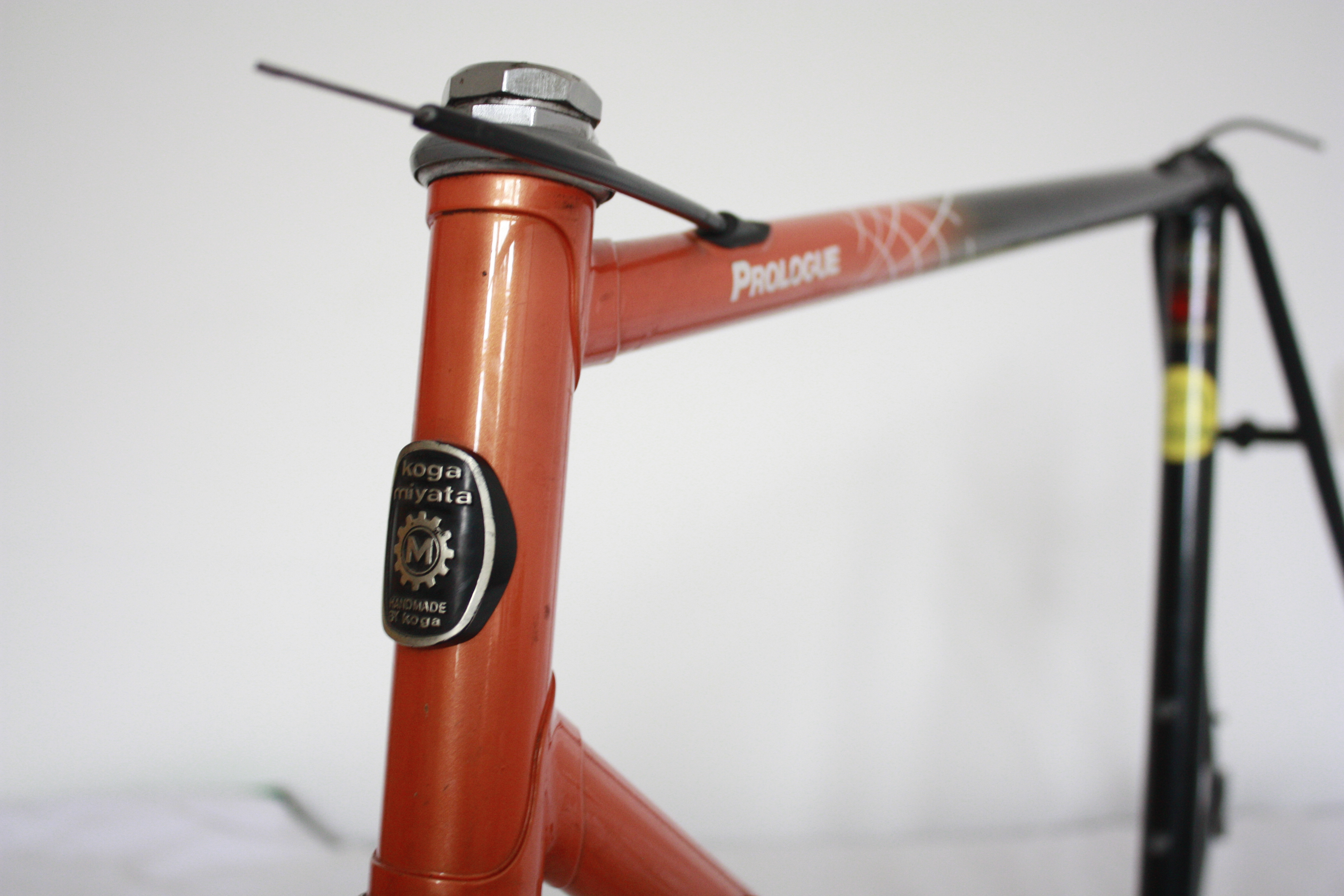
Koga Miyata Prologue frame from the early 1990this (1990-1994).

=== Early models ===
Some of the early company brochures are publicly available for download.

- Pro-Racer
- Pro-Luxe
- FullPro-L
- Gents-Racer
- Gents-Touring
- Gents-Luxe
- Road Racer
- Road Winner
- Road Speed
- Road-Mixed
- Silver-Ace

=== Current models ===
A summary of the Koga 2023 bicycle-lineup:

==== E-bikes ====
- Pace
- E-Nova
- Vectro
- E-Inspire
- E-Worldtraveller

==== City-/touring-/trekking-bikes ====
- F3
- Supermetro
- Worldtraveller

==== Road-/Gravel-bikes ====
- Kimera
- Colmaro
- Senko
- Kinsei
