= Coka =

[[ thumb ]]

Coka or Čoka may refer to:

- Čoka, Serbia, a town and municipality
- Coka, Tibet, a town
  - Emilio Buale, or in full "Ludwig Emilio Buale Coka", Equatoguinean-Spanish actor

== See also ==
- Coke (disambiguation)
