= Giuseppe Coco =

Italian comics artist and illustrator

Giuseppe Coco (1936 – 4 August 2012) was an Italian comics artist and illustrator.

== Biography ==
Born in Biancavilla, Province of Catania, Coco started his career in the 1960s as an illustrator of the satyrical magazine Il Travaso delle idee. He worked for many Italian magazines and newspapers, notably La Repubblica, L'espresso, Famiglia Cristiana, Playmen, La Gazzetta dello Sport, La Domenica del Corriere and Epoca. He also collaborated with some international magazines, including El País, Paris Match, Stern, Hara-Kiri, The Saturday Evening Post, Punch. In 2006, on the occasion of the seventieth birthday of Coco, several artists including Dario Fo, Mœbius, Bruno Bozzetto, Milo Manara, Quino, Osvaldo Cavandoli and Sergio Staino, celebrated him with a series of unreleased and exclusive writings and drawings, published in a volume titled Omaggi al maestro. Per il settantesimo compleanno di Coco ("Homage to the teacher. For the seventieth birthday of Coco"). The Museum of satirical drawings in Biancavilla was named after him.
