= Cocoa =

Cocoa may refer to:

== Botany and culinary ==
- Theobroma cacao, or cocoa tree
  - Cocoa bean, seed of Theobroma cacao
    - Cocoa butter, a pale yellow, edible fat extracted from the cocoa bean
    - Cocoa powder, a brown powder, extracted from the cocoa bean
    - Chocolate, made out of cocoa beans
      - Chocolate liquor, or cocoa liquor, pure, liquid chocolate extracted from the cocoa bean, including both cocoa butter and cocoa solids
      - Hot chocolate, also called hot cocoa or simply cocoa

== Computing ==
- Cocoa (API), an API and programming environment for macOS
- Cocoa Touch, an API and programming environment for iOS, iPadOS, watchOS and tvOS
- CoCoA, a computer algebra system
- COCOA (digital humanities), an early FORTRAN program for generating concordances and word counts from natural language texts
- Stagecast Creator, formerly Cocoa, a language developed by Apple to teach programming to children

== People ==
- Cocoa Brown (born 1972), American actress and writer
- Cocoa Chanelle (born 1971), American DJ and musician
- Cocoa Fujiwara (1983–2015), Japanese manga artist and illustrator
- Cocoa Samoa (1945–2007), American-Samoan professional wrestler
- Cocoa Tea (1959–2025), Jamaican singer and songwriter

== Places ==
- Cocoa, Florida, a city in the US
- Cocoa Beach, Florida, a neighboring town
- Cocoa Crater, a volcanic cone in British Columbia, Canada

== Organizations ==
- Cocoa Mountain, a gourmet chocolate enterprise in Durness in the North West Highlands of Scotland
- Cocoa Processing Company, a Ghanaian company

== Other uses ==
- Cocoa brown, a version of the color chocolate
- Cocoa (Is the Order a Rabbit?), a character in the manga series Is the Order a Rabbit?
- COVID-19 Contact-Confirming Application, often abbreviated as COCOA, Japanese COVID-19 contact tracing app

== See also ==
- Cacao (disambiguation)
- Cocoa solids (disambiguation)
- Coca (disambiguation)
- Coco (disambiguation)
- Co-Co (disambiguation)
- Cocoa Exchange (disambiguation)
- Koko (disambiguation)
