= Coco (surname) =

Coco is a surname. Notable people with the surname include:

- Alex Coco, American film producer
- Angela Coco, Australian sociologist
- Chester Coco (1915–2001), American politician and lawyer
- Ettore Coco (1908–1991), New York mobster
- Francesco Coco (born 1977), Italian retired football player
- Giuseppe Coco (1936–2012), Italian comics artist and illustrator
- Jack Coco (born 1998), American football player
- James Coco (1930–1987), American actor
- Juanita Coco (1975–1993), Australian singer and actress
- Menzy Coco (born 1989), Mauritian footballer
- Saúl Coco (born 1999), Equatoguinean footballer
