= Coco River (disambiguation) =

The Coco River is a river in southern Honduras and northern Nicaragua.

The Coco River or Rio Coco may refer also to:

- Coco River (Araguaia River), a river of Tocantins, Brazil
- Coco River (Puerto Rico), a river of Puerto Rico
- Cocó River (Ceará state), river on the coast of Brazil

== See also ==
- Cổ Cò River, Vietnam
