= Anthony Leeds =

- Born: January 26, 1925; New York City, New York
- Died: February 20, 1989 (aged 64); Tunbridge, Vermont
- Education: Columbia University
- Occupation: Anthropologist

Anthony Leeds (January 26, 1925 – February 20, 1989) was an American anthropologist best known for his work in the favelas of Rio de Janeiro and on urban-rural relations in Brazil.

== Education ==
He received his B.A. in anthropology from Columbia University in 1949. Field work in Bahia, Brazil, led to his dissertation "Economic Cycles in Brazil: The Persistence of a Total-Culture Pattern: Cacao and Other Cases". Students at Columbia at roughly the same time were Marvin Harris, Sally Falk Moore, Robert Murphy, and Andrew P. Vayda. Leeds earned his PhD in anthropology from Columbia University in 1957.

== Career ==
Leeds conducted field work among the Yaruro people in Venezuela, in the favelas of Rio de Janeiro, in the barriadas of Lima, Peru, and on labor migration in Portugal. In 1982, he became one of the first presidents of the Society for Urban Anthropology. His work reflected his wide interests; he wrote on squatters, class, warfare, technology, labor migration, rural-urban relations, systems theory, human ecology, pigs in Melanesia, and reindeer in Siberia, among other topics. He hosted Thursday night gatherings of graduate students and like-minded faculty at his house in Dedham, Massachusetts. His influence continues to shape the work of anthropologists in the United States, Brazil, Portugal, and elsewhere.

He worked at the Baldwin School in New York and at the Pan-American Union's Program of Urban Development, traveling widely in South America. He taught at Hofstra University, the City College of New York, and at the University of Texas, Austin from 1963 to 1972. He was a visiting professor at the University of London and University of Oxford with a Fulbright Fellowship for a year. He then moved to Boston University, where he taught from 1973 until his death in 1989.

== Personal ==
He also wrote poetry and was a photographer. He was married twice, first to Jo Alice Lowrey, with whom he had three children, Madeleine, John, and Anne, and to Elizabeth Plotkin, with whom he had two children, Jeremy and Jared. Leeds died of a heart attack on February 20, 1989, at his home in Tunbridge, VT, at the age of 64.

The Anthony Leeds Prize is awarded in his honor by the Society for Urban, National, Transnational and Global Anthropology (formerly the Society for Urban Anthropology). His papers are housed at the Smithsonian's National Anthropological Archives and also with the Oswaldo Cruz Foundation in Rio de Janeiro, Brazil.
