= Centre for Research on Computer Supported Learning and Cognition =

Australian research centre

- Established: 1 January 2016; 10 years ago
- Mission: Research into academic learning and innovation
- Co-Directors: Professor Peter Reimann; Associate Professor Lina Markauskaite
- Faculty: University of Sydney, Faculty of Arts and Social Sciences, Sydney School of Education and Social Work
- Formerly called: Computer Supported Learning and Cognition Centre (CoCo); Sciences and Technologies of Learning (STL)
- Location: Manning Road, Camperdown campus, The University of Sydney, Sydney, New South Wales, Australia
- Coordinates: 33°53′13″S 151°11′14″E
- Interactive map of Centre for Research on Computer Supported Learning and Cognition
- Website: crlionline.net

The Centre for Research on Computer Supported Learning and Cognition (CRLI) is an education research centre within the Faculty of Arts and Social Sciences of The University of Sydney that carries out research into the sciences and technologies of learning. Established on 1 January 2016, the Centre was formed through the amalgamation of the University's Computer Supported Learning and Cognition Centre (CoCo) and the Sciences and Technologies of Learning (STL) research network.

The Centre is located in the Education Building (A35), adjacent to Manning Road, that houses the Sydney School of Education and Social Work on the University's Camperdown campus, New South Wales, Australia. The Co-Directors of the Centre are Professor Peter Reimann and Associate Professor Lina Markauskaite.

The Centre leads a graduate program in Learning Science and Technology.

== Research areas ==
Key focus areas for the Centre's research groups include:

- Knowledge co-creation
- Neuroscience and education
- Learning analytics
- Student partnerships
- Learning spaces
- Interdisciplinarity

As of January 2020, the Centre accommodated approximately 20 teaching and lecturing research staff and approximately 30 post-graduate research students. The Centre is a member of the Institute for Innovation in Science and Mathematics Education (IISME).

The Centre investigates factors that move research on learning and innovation forward and shape fundamental learning and innovation outcomes by:

- connecting learning researchers and educational innovators at the University of Sydney and the wider community;
- studying innovation as a multifaceted phenomenon that drives improvement in learning and education; and
- committing to methodological innovation that enables the linkage between theory and practice.

== History ==
The CoCo Research Centre was launched in 2004 by professors Peter Goodyear and Peter Reimann. Goodyear was previously Professor of Educational Research at the University of Lancaster and Reimann was previously Professor of Educational Psychology at the University of Heidelberg. The CoCo Research Centre grew from 5 to 40 team members since its inception until its amalgamation with the Sciences and Technologies of Learning research network in 2016 to form the Centre for Research on Computer Supported Learning and Cognition. Prior to its amalgamation, the CoCo Research Centre included approximately 70 members including affiliates and externals. Co-director Peter Goodyear was named a Laureate Fellow by the Australian Research Council in July 2010. This was the first of these fellowships to be given to a researcher in the field of education.

The Centre for Research on Computer Supported Learning and Cognition was formed on 1 January 2016 through the amalgamation of the CoCo Research Centre and the Sciences and Technologies of Learning research network.

== Events ==
The Centre organises a number of events, including the following:

- Learning and Innovation Research Fest – held annually, this free event attracts approximately 150 participants and covers topics including learning with VR/XR, AI in education, interdisciplinary research, innovative learning spaces, and student partnerships
- a Sydney research seminar series

In 2012 the CoCo Research Centre hosted the International Conference of the Learning Sciences.

== Books ==
The CoCo Research Centre's published contributions to research include a number of books in the field, including:

- Carvalho, L.; Goodyear, P., eds. (2014). The architecture of productive learning networks. New York: Routledge.
- Goodyear, P.; Retalis, S., eds. (2010). Technology-enhanced learning: design patterns and pattern languages. Rotterdam: Sense Publishers.
- Jacobson, M. J.; Reimann, P., eds. (2010). Designs for learning environments of the future: International perspectives from the learning sciences. New York: Springer-Verlag.
- Ellis, R.; Goodyear, P. (2010). Students experiences of e-learning in higher education: the ecology of sustainable innovation. New York: Routeledge.
- Freebody, P. (2007). Literacy Education in School Research perspectives from the past, for the future. Camberwell, Victoria: ACER.
