= Coco, West Virginia =

Unincorporated community in West Virginia, United States

- Unincorporated community
- Location in West Virginia and the United States Coco (the United States)
- Coordinates: 38°24′11″N 81°25′9″W
- Country: United States
- State: West Virginia
- County: Kanawha
- Elevation: 653 ft (199 m)
- Time zone: UTC-5 (Eastern (EST))
  - Summer (DST): UTC-4 (EDT)
- GNIS ID: 1549635

Coco is an unincorporated community in Kanawha County, West Virginia, United States. The community was originally named "Poco," after a rooster featured in a story, but the spelling was changed during postal processing. Before being named Coco, the area was known as "Elklick", a name likely derived from the presence of elk in the region. Coco is also home to a cemetery named "Coco Cemetery," which contains 19 memorials.
