= Coco Chanel (disambiguation) =

Coco Chanel (1883–1971) was a French fashion designer.

Coco Chanel may also refer to:

- Coco Chanel (film), 2008
- "Coco Chanel" (Eladio Carrión and Bad Bunny song), 2023
- "Coco Chanel" (Gaia song), 2020
- "Coco Chanel", a song by Nicki Minaj from her 2018 album Queen

== See also ==
- "Coco" (24kGoldn song), 2020
- DJ Cocoa Chanelle (born 1971), American DJ
