= Coco Marusix =

Peruvian transcender Woman and showgirl

- Coco Marusix Campos
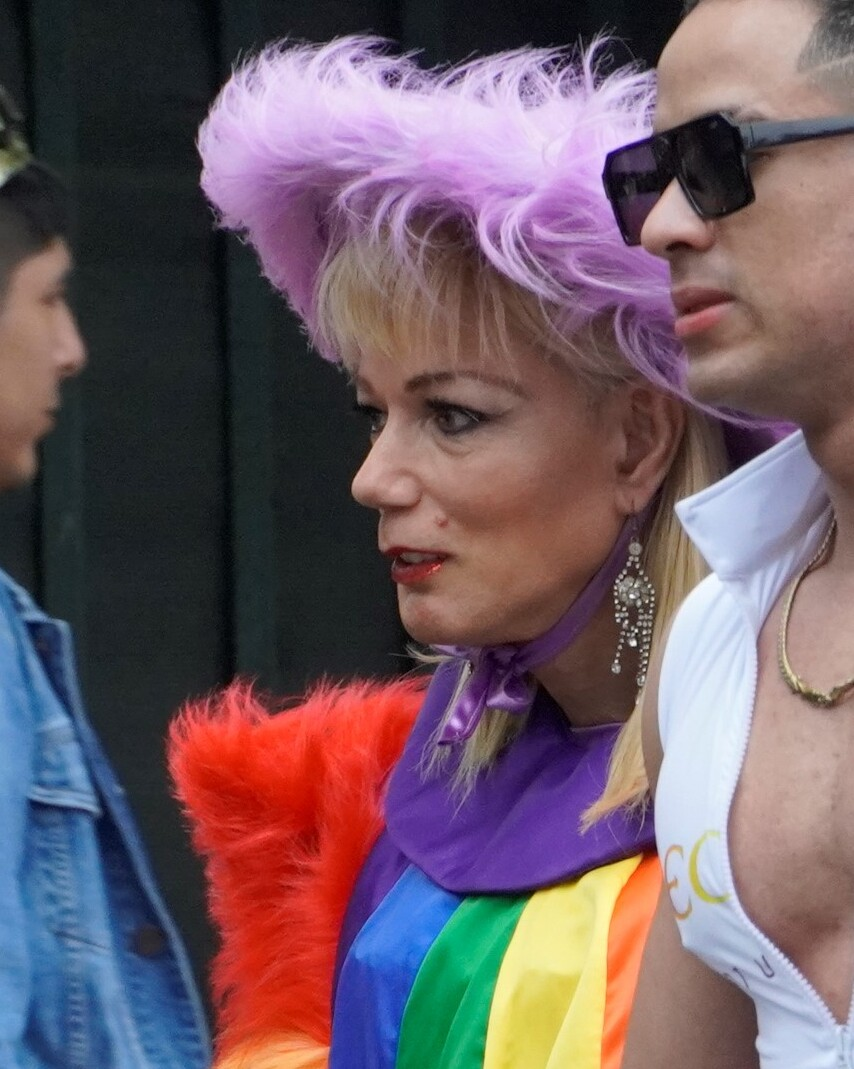
- Coco Marusix in 2025
- Born: December 3, 1964 (age 61)
- Citizenship: Peruvian
- Education: Pontifical Catholic University of Peru
- Occupations: Drag queen, vedette, and dancer

Coco Marusix Campos (b. December 3, 1964) is a drag queen and vedette from Peru. She became an LGBT icon in her country thanks to the fame she achieved during the 1990s.

== Biography ==
Marusix was born in the La Perla District of Callao on December 3, 1964. She began her career in the world of transformism and dance at a very young age, during the 1980s. She was discovered during a beauty pageant by television producer Efraín Aguilar, who invited her to perform in a musical revue (Music Travesti Hall) where she impersonated Marilyn Monroe and Tongolele.

In the late 90s, when she was famous in the artistic world, she ventured into television. Alongside Marisol Malpartida, she hosted the show Loca Visión in 1998 on Channel 9 ATV; the show only aired one episode before being censored. She was also part of the vedette cast of the comedy show Risas y salsa.

She also appeared in the film Nunca más, lo juro in 1991.

In 2002 she acted in the film Baño de damas by director Michael Kats, playing the role of a trans woman.

The following year, in March 2003, she suffered a stroke that affected the mobility of her lower limbs, which kept her away from the stage and led to a deep depression.

In 2015 she participated in the massive Pride and Equality March in Lima, alongside artists such as Ricardo Morán, Tatiana Astengo, Mónica Sánchez, and politician Verónika Mendoza.

In 2018 she appeared as a guest judge on the talent show El artista del año, hosted by Gisela Valcárcel.

== Legacy ==
American performer Miss Coco Peru took her stage name from Coco Marusix, whom she met personally in the late 1990s.

In 2023, the Peruvian drag queen Georgia Hart portrayed her in the biographical film Chabuca, which tells the story of Ernesto Pimentel.

== Filmography ==
=== Television ===
- Loca Visión
- Risas y salsa
- El artista del año

=== Films ===
- Nunca más, lo juro (1991)
- Baño de damas (2003)
