= USS Koka =

Three ships of the United States Navy have been named USS Koka:

- USS Koka (1865) was a twin-screw monitor, launched in 1865, which never entered into active service and was scrapped in 1874.
- USS Koka (AT-31) was a tugboat in service from 1920 until 1938.
- USS Koka (ATA-185) a tugboat launched in 1944.
