= Coco Mellors =

British writer (born 1989)

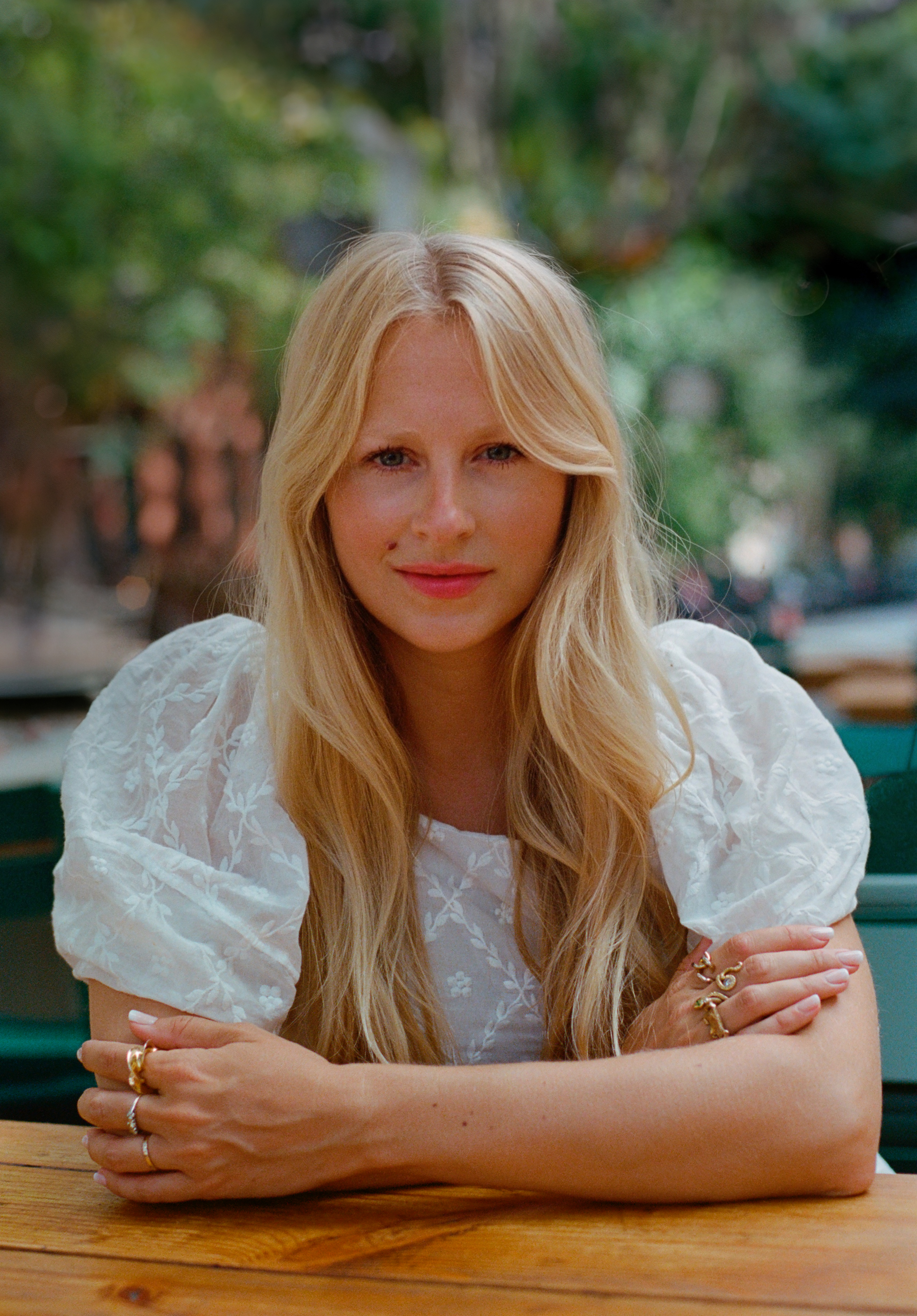
- Mellors
- Born: 1989 (age 36–37)
- Education: New York University
- Occupation: Writer
- Website: www.cocomellors.com

Coco Mellors (born 1989) is a New York writer known for her work in fiction and various writing roles, including copywriting, journalism, and scriptwriting. She authored the bestselling novel Cleopatra and Frankenstein (2022) and the New York Times bestseller Blue Sisters (2024).

== Life and education ==
Mellors was raised in London and moved to New York City at the age of 15 with her family. Her father is an advertising executive, and her mother is a therapist. She is the youngest of four siblings. She earned a Master of Fine Arts (MFA) in fiction from New York University (NYU). During her studies, she interned at W Magazine in 2009. In 2020, she relocated to Los Angeles, where she lived with her husband, a British brand strategist. They have since returned to New York. Mellors has openly discussed her struggles with alcoholism during her teenage and early adult years in New York, achieving sobriety while writing her debut novel, Cleopatra and Frankenstein, which she completed at the age of 26.

In addition to her novels, she co-wrote the short film Every Kind of Way for the artist H.E.R., directed by Frank Sean. Mellors also wrote and appeared in a J Crew short episode of Style Hacks and co-starred in a short episode for the J Crew holiday collection in 2019.

== Works ==
- Cleopatra and Frankenstein (2022)
- Blue Sisters (2024)
