= Coco3 =

Coco3 can refer to:

- Cobalt(II) carbonate, an inorganic compound with the formula CoCO_{3}
- The third and final version of the TRS-80 Color Computer, a 6809-based home computer launched by Radio Shack
