= Coco Guzmán =

Spanish visual artist

- Born: 1979 (age 46–47); Murcia, Spain
- Education: École Supérieure des Beaux-Arts de Toulouse, Université de Paris VIII, Universidad de Murcia
- Occupations: Visual Artist, Author, Professor
- Employer(s): Seneca College, Lakehead University
- Known for: Queer Activism, Social Justice Activism
- Awards: 2015 Artscape Award in the Visual Arts, Toronto, ON
- Website: http://www.cocoriot.com/

Coco Guzmán, known also as Coco Riot (born 1979) is a queer visual artist from Murcia, Spain, who is internationally known for their activism and artistic exploration of gender equality and feminist issues.

Guzmán was born in a small city in Southern Spain and grew up in a family of scientists. At 19, Guzman moved to France for higher education and became involved in feminist, queer, and anarchist movements in Europe. After obtaining a Master of Arts in Comparative Medieval Literature at Paris VIII University in 2003, Guzman began exploring the queer graphic novel as an artistic medium. Guzmán was accepted to the Toulouse Fine Arts Academy, to pursue a Bachelor of Fine Arts. In 2008, Guzman moved to Montreal (Canada), where they worked at articule. Guzman later moved to Toronto and taught at Seneca College and Lakehead University. Guzman currently lives in Madrid, Spain.

== Exhibitions ==
- Genderpoo (2008)
- Los Fantasmas/The Ghosts (2015)
- The Demonstration (2016)
- Paraiso/Paradise premiere: Manif d'Art 8, International Quebec City Biennial, Quebec City, Quebec, Canada [curated group exhibition] (2017)

== Publications ==
- Telling Our Stories: Immigrant Women's Resilience (2017)
- Llueven Queers
- Artistic citizenship:Queer and Trans People of Color Community Arts Collective: Ste- Émilie Skillshare, A New Letter Named Square
