= Coca Cola Corporation =

The Coca Cola Corporation was an Atlanta, Georgia company, the first large-scale manufacturer and marketer of beverages based on the Coca-Cola formula, and closely related to The Coca-Cola Company, the corporation that took on that role by 1900 and became a worldwide business.
