= Batavus =

Dutch bicycle manufacturer

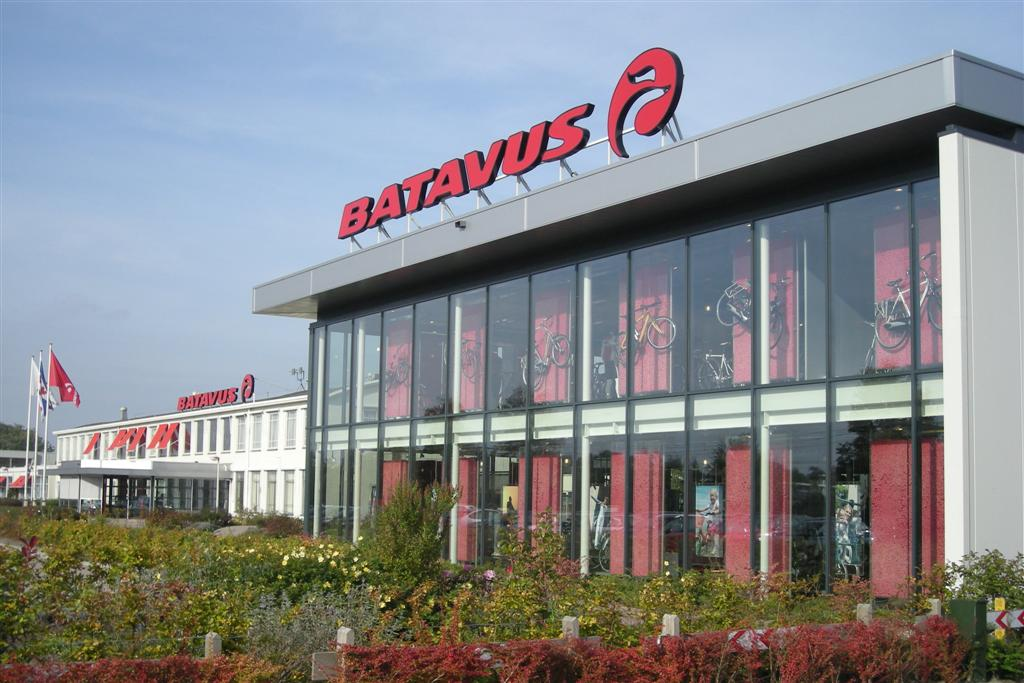
- Type: Division
- Industry: Bicycles, mopeds
- Founded: 1904; 122 years ago
- Founder: Andries Gaastra
- Headquarters: Heerenveen, Netherlands
- Products: Bicycle and related components, mopeds and motorcycles
- Parent: The Curator
- Website: www.batavus.com

Batavus BV is a Dutch bicycle manufacturer, owned by the curators. Batavus Intercycle Corporation was the leading manufacturer of bicycles and mopeds in the Netherlands during the 1970s. During its most productive years, the company's 350,000 sq ft (33,000 m^{2}). Heerenveen plant employed 700 to produce 70,000 Batavus mopeds and 250,000 bicycles a year. During this time, Batavus was exporting 55 percent of its production with the remainder going to the Netherlands, which had more than two million mopeds in 1977.

== History ==
=== 1900–1924: Foundation and expansion ===
In 1904, Andries Gaastra opened a shop selling clocks and small farm machinery. Within two years, he had added bicycles, selling bikes manufactured by the German company Presto. Soon, he began making and selling bicycles under the Batavus brand. By 1917, Batavus had taken over a large bicycle factory.

=== 1925–1949: Downturn and moped ===
The 1930s proved difficult as much of Europe was in economic recession, but Batavus continued growing by diversifying to include carrier tricycles, motorcycles, and ice skates. World War II saw the temporary shutdown of the factory. Business resumed in 1945 when the war ended and demand for bicycles increased. The company invested in a new factory with modern assembly lines, which brought it to the forefront of bike manufacturing. In 1948, Batavus was one of the first to develop and manufacture its own moped.

=== 1950–1974: Scaling up ===
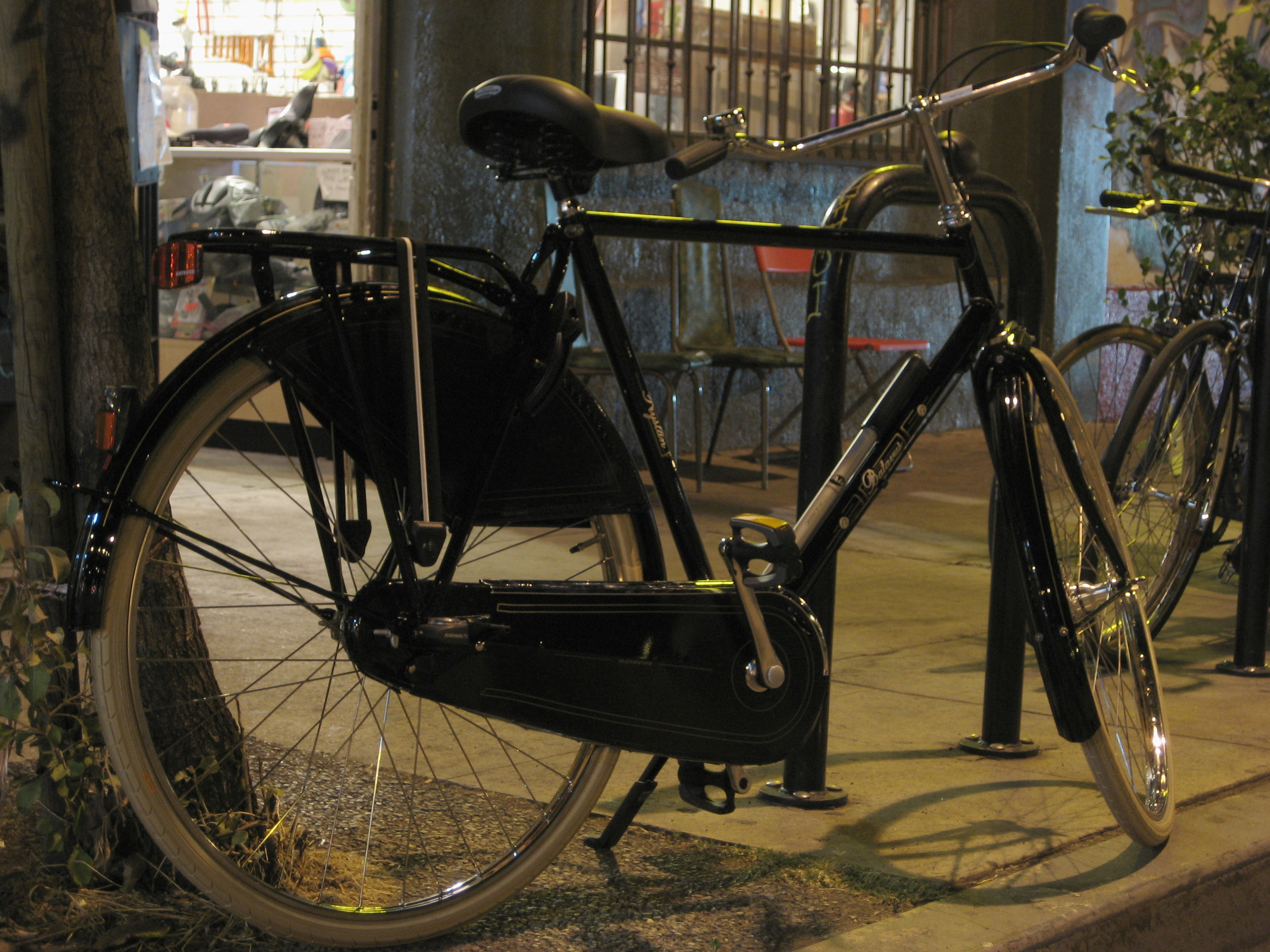
Brand new Batavus Dutch Roadster

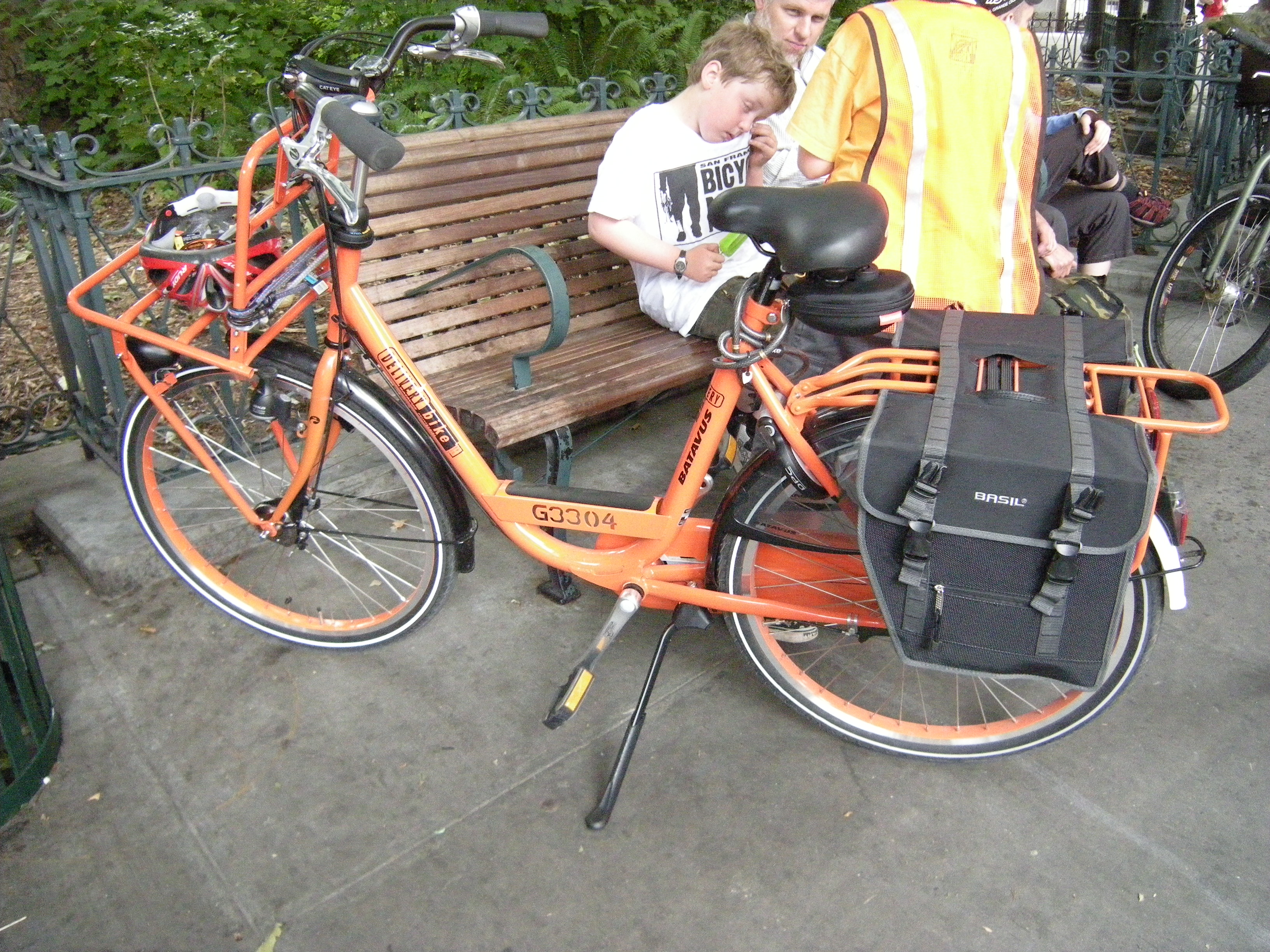
Freight bike in Seattle

By 1954, the company's assorted buildings produced a variety of machines, but in 1956, 52 years after Gaastra opened his shop, a new factory opened in the industrial park in Heerenveen. It had an area of 6000 square meters and the workforce had grown to 300. Further extensions and developments became necessary and today the company employs about 650. After the new premises opened the company continued primarily to be a bicycle manufacturer and benefited from growing demand all over the world. However, in 1969, Batavus acquired the bicycle and motorcycle production of another Dutch company, Magneet, and the following year took over three three-wheeler factories in Germany. Although sales of motorized two-wheelers were increasingly fluctuated, with model and style changes, there was steady growth every year.

In 1970, Batavus joined the Dutch Laura group, which includes Laura Motoren, and Laura Engines used on Batavus mopeds in the UK, except the Sachs-powered sports machine and the Mk 4S. First imports to the UK were in 1973, with the setting up of Harglo by two former BSA/Triumph executives, Wilf Harrison and Peter Glover. They imported and distributed Batavus mopeds in the UK and Ireland.

The early Go-Go V was a rigid frame machine, discontinued, but after the introduction of the Go-Go VA, four new machines were added to the UK market in 1974 and two more in 1976. By this time the company had a reputation for quality machines, which, while not the cheapest, were good to look at and offered little trouble.

=== 1975–1999: Racing ===
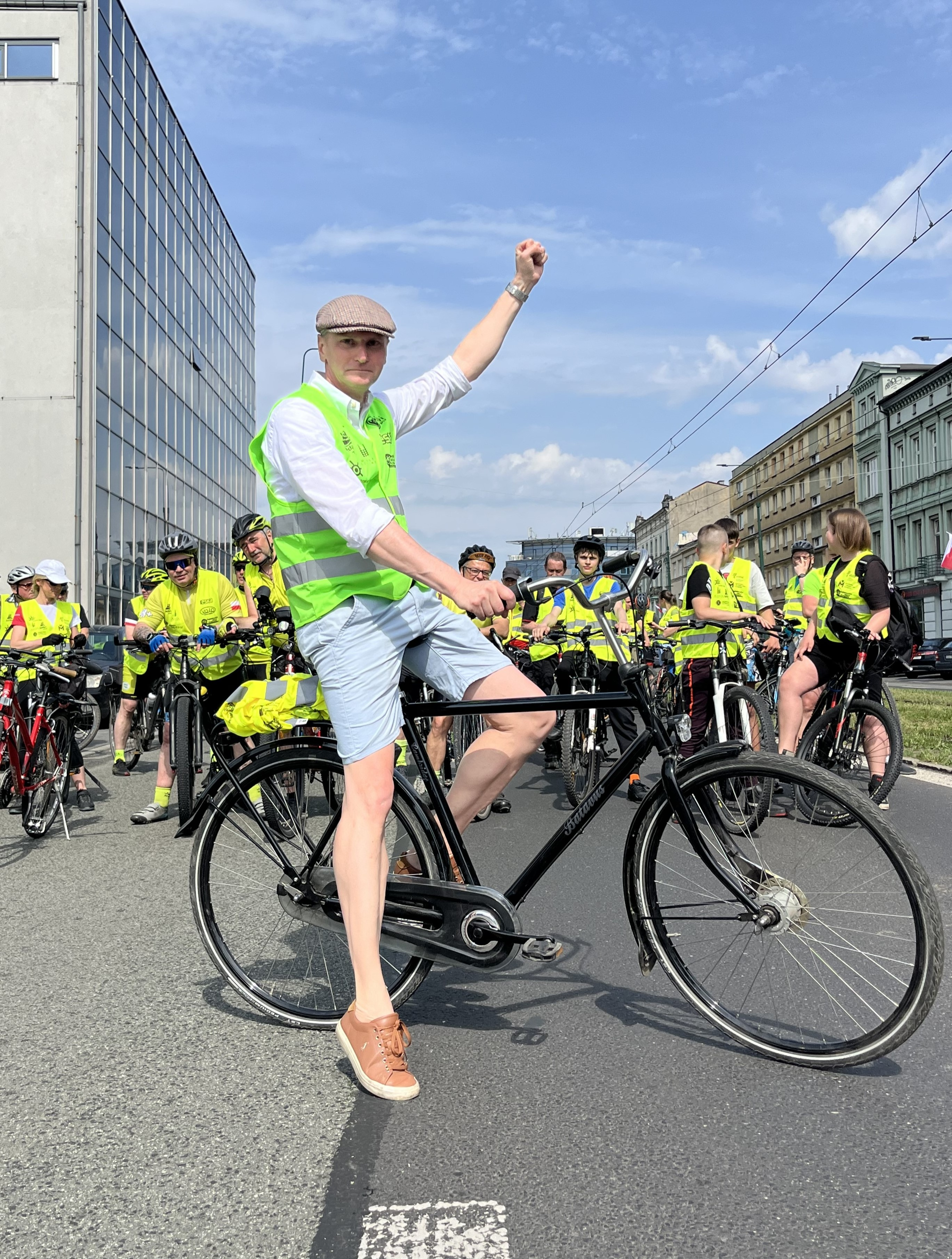
in Poland during the Zagłębie Critical Mass

At Earls Court, London, in 1976, Batavus showed the seven-model range; six machines were powered by the 48cc Laura engine, with V-belt primary drive and automatic clutch. The exception was the top-of-the-range Mk 4S, with motorcycle styling and the Sachs four-speed motor. Specification include an electronic tachometer, battery-operated turn signals and heavy-duty suspension front and rear. This model, which has the overall dimensions of a full-sized motorcycle was the biggest machine sold by Batavus.

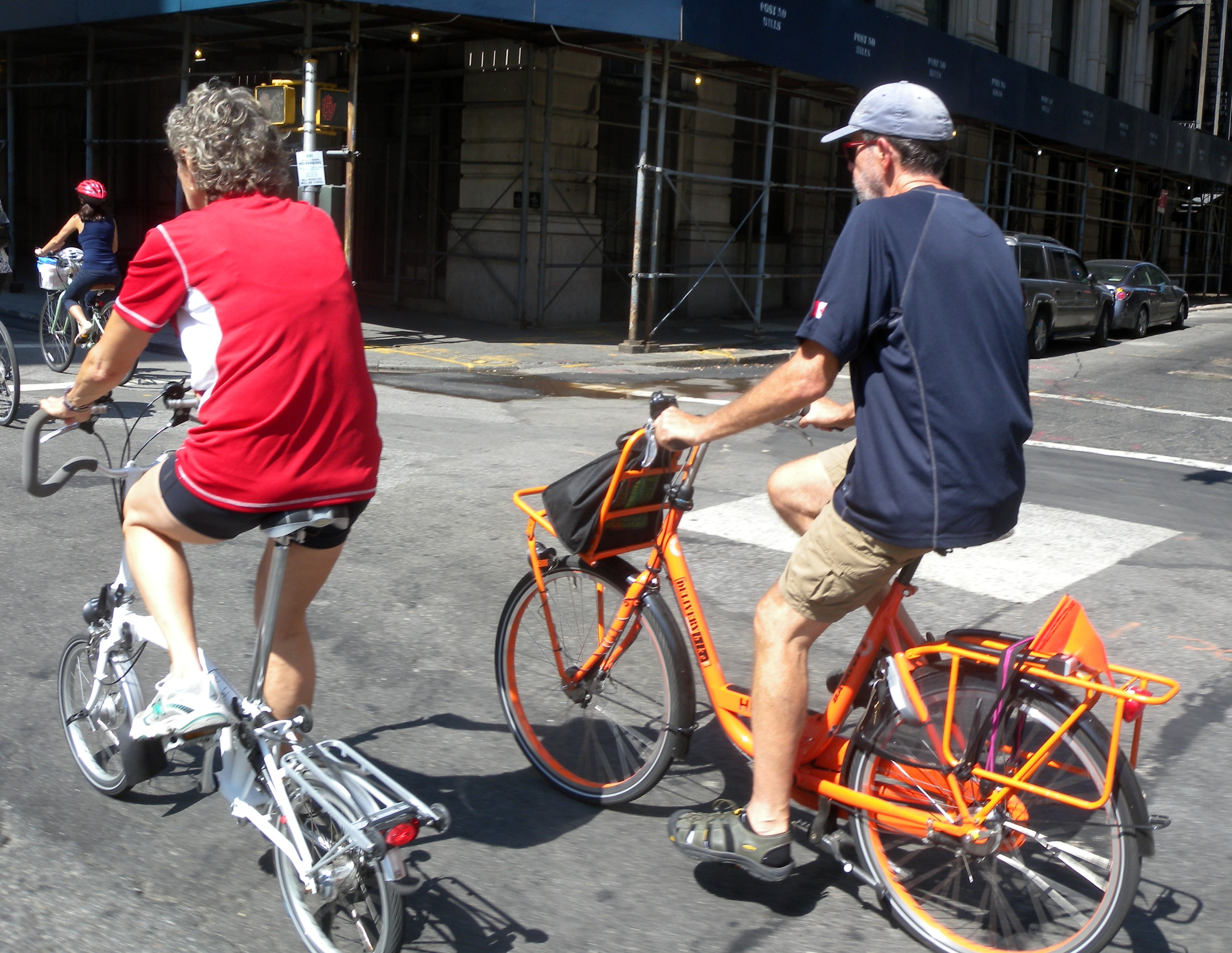
In New York

As early as 1972 total production of bicycles was 250,000 and mopeds 60,000 a year. Of these, 60,000 bicycles and 27,000 mopeds went abroad. Sales were strong in West Germany and Switzerland. Iran, Israel, Belgium and Greece were also important. In Turkey, Batavus mopeds began to be manufactured under license in 1972. In 1977, Batavus made more bicycles and mopeds than any other company in the Netherlands. It was the biggest Dutch exporter of machines, with 55 percent of production going outside the Netherlands to accommodate interest for fuel-efficient transport in the USA during the 1970s. Batavus set up its USA headquarters in Atlanta, GA.

In the early 1970s, bicycle demand continued to increase, prompting Batavus to expand the factory to 25,000 square meters. Moped demand declined, and although there was a significant increase in moped popularity in the USA during the fuel crisis of the 1970s, Batavus built and shipped the last moped in the early 1980s.

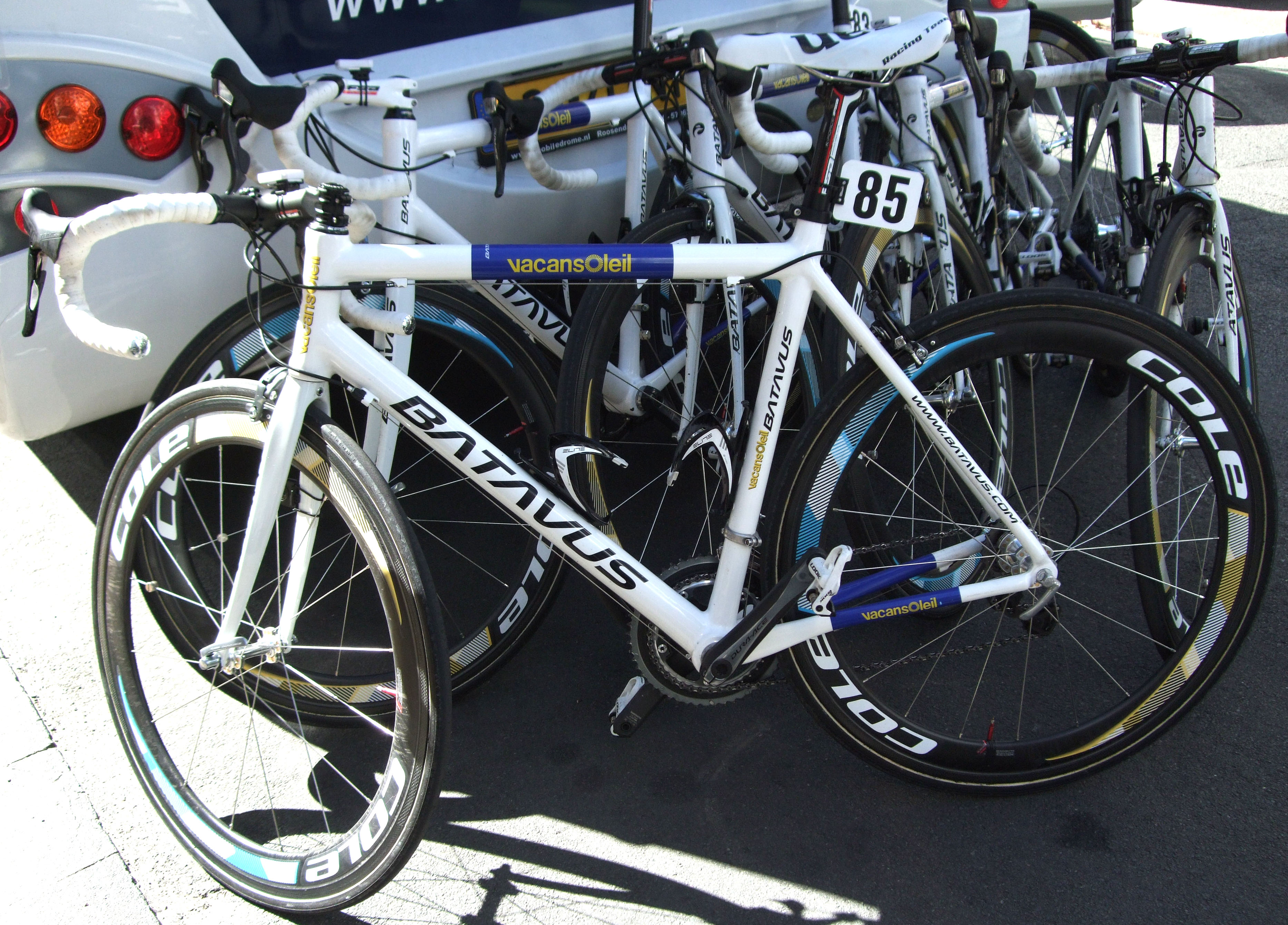
Batavus bicycle race from 2010.

During the 1986 and 1992 Olympic Games, Batavus was official supplier of the Dutch Cycling Union (KNWU). Monique Knol won a bronze medal during the 1992 Olympics on a Batavus. Leontien van Moorsel won the Tour Feminin twice, riding Batavus bicycles. In the US, the Agrati-Garelli Corp., the importer of Batavus bicycles, sponsored an amateur men's and women's team from 1983 to 1985 which was managed by Constantin Negulescu, a former amateur cyclist from Romania living in the Boston, MA. region. Negulescu was successful in placing a number of Batavus riders on the U.S. National team during these years and later went on to coach at the national and international levels.

In 1988, Batavus began to invest in research and development from 1996. The company won the Good Industrial Design award for its Safety Handlebar, Quick Service chain guard, Safety Stander and Ergo System stem innovations.

=== 2000–2025: Continued racing ===
In 2008, Batavus was a co-sponsor of P3Transfer-Batavus. Bobbie Traksel rode a Batavus to victory in the 2008 Driedaagse van West-Vlaanderen.
