= National Register of Historic Places listings in Howell County, Missouri =

Location of Howell County in Missouri

Howell County, Missouri, United States, has seven properties and districts listed on the National Register of Historic Places.

Latitude and longitude coordinates are provided for many National Register properties and districts; these locations may be seen together in a map.

This National Park Service list is complete through NPS recent listings posted August 28, 2026.

== Current listings ==
	Name on the Register	Image	Date listed	Location	City or town	Description
1	Courthouse Square Historic District	Courthouse Square Historic District	July 17, 2003 (#03000651)	Roughly bounded by Broadway, Grove St., Court Sq. and Washington Ave. 36°43′43″N 91°51′08″W	West Plains	
2	Elledge Arcade Buildings	Elledge Arcade Buildings	January 26, 2001 (#01000011)	28 Court Sq. and 2 Elledge Arcade; 36°43′43″N 91°51′10″W	West Plains	
3	International Shoe Company Building	International Shoe Company Building	November 8, 2011 (#11000783)	665 Missouri Ave. 36°44′05″N 91°51′31″W	West Plains	One-story industrial building constructed in 1946
4	Lincoln School	Lincoln School	January 29, 2025 (#100011398)	1400 E. Pony Thomas Street; 36°44′30″N 91°51′08″W	West Plains	One-room schoolhouse built in 1926 when West Plains' schools were segregated, to educate Black children. Operated until 1954, when Brown v. Board of Education required integration, and Lincoln's students were distributed among West Plains' White schools. Now a museum.
5	Mount Zion Lodge Masonic Temple	Mount Zion Lodge Masonic Temple	April 15, 2011 (#11000188)	304 E. Main St. 36°43′41″N 91°51′01″W	West Plains	Masonic building
6	W. J. and Ed Smith Building	W. J. and Ed Smith Building	January 26, 2001 (#01000012)	109-113 Washington Ave. 36°43′44″N 91°51′09″W	West Plains	
7	West Plains Bank Building	West Plains Bank Building	September 7, 2001 (#01000013)	107 Washington Ave. 36°43′44″N 91°51′09″W	West Plains	

== See also ==
- List of National Historic Landmarks in Missouri
- National Register of Historic Places listings in Missouri
