= Koko =

Koko or KOKO may refer to:

== Animals ==
- Koko (gorilla) (1971–2018), a gorilla trained to communicate in American Sign Language
- Koko (dog) (2005–2012), the Australian kelpie in the 2011 film Red Dog
- Koko (horse), an Irish racehorse that won the 1926 Cheltenham Gold Cup
- Ko'ko' or Guam rail, a flightless bird

== Plants ==
- Central African name for Gnetum africanum, an edible vegetable

== Places ==
- Koko, Benin, a town and arrondissement in Benin
- Koko, Bouaké, a neighbourhood of Bouaké, Ivory Coast
- Koko, Savanes, a village in the Ivory Coast
- Koko, Delta, a town in Delta State, Nigeria
- Koko, a town in Koko/Besse Local Government Area in Kebbi State, Nigeria
- Koko Head, the headland that defines the eastern side of Maunalua Bay along the southeastern side of the Island of Oʻahu in Hawaiʻi
- Koko River, Rusizi District, a river in southwestern Rwanda that is a tributary of the Ruhwa River
- Koko River, Rutsiro District, a river in the Rutsiro District of western Rwanda that flows into Lake Kivu
- Kokõ, village in Rõuge Parish, Võru County, Estonia

== People with the name ==
Mononyms

- Emperor Kōkō (830–887), 58th emperor of Japan
- King Koko or Frederick William Koko Mingi VIII of Nembe (1853–1898), African ruler of the Nembe Kingdom

Given name

- Koko Archibong (born 1981), Nigerian-American basketball player
- Koko Prasetyo Darkuncoro (born 1981), Indonesian beach volleyball player
- Koko Jones (born 1989), American jazz percussionist
- Koko Komégné (born 1950), Cameroonian visual artist
- Koko Kondo (born 1944), birth name Koko Tanimoto, a prominent Japanese atomic bomb survivor
- Koko Lahanas, American former basketball player
- Koko Pimentel (born 1964), Filipino politician
- Koko Sakibo (born 1987), Nigerian footballer
- Koko Stambuk (born 1977), Chilean singer-songwriter and producer
- Julio "Koko" Sosa (born 1926), Argentine guitarist
- Koko Taylor (1928–2009), R&B singer
- Kōko Tsurumi (born 1992), Japanese artistic gymnast
- Koko B. Ware (born 1957), American professional wrestler

Middle name

- James Koko Lomell (born 1985), Liberian footballer

Surname

- Demeter Koko (1891–1929), Austrian graphic artist
- Georgette Koko (born 1953), Gabonese politician
- Lolani Koko (born 1963), Samoan rugby football player

Stage name / ring name

- Koko B. Ware (born 1957), American professional wrestler real name James Ware, Koko B. being his ring name

== Music ==
- Koko (music venue), a music venue in London
- KOKO (album), by the Lottery Winners
- "Ko-Ko", a 1945 jazz composition by Charlie Parker
- "Ko-Ko", a 1940 jazz composition by Duke Ellington
- "Koko", a 2005 song by Goldfrapp from Supernature
- "Koko", a 2011 song by Sander van Doorn from Eleve11
- "Koko", a 2025 song by Puerto Rican rapper Omar Courtz

== Radio stations ==
- KOKO (AM), a radio station (1450 AM) licensed to serve Warrensburg, Missouri, United States
- KOKO-FM, a radio station (94.3 FM) licensed to serve Kerman, California, United States
- KOKO-LP, a radio station (96.3 FM) licensed to serve Hana, Hawaii, United States

== Characters ==
- Koko the Clown, a 1919 cartoon character
- Koko/Kao K’o Kung, a character in the Cat Who... series by Lilian Jackson Braun
- Ko-Ko, a character from The Mikado
- Koko, a character in Chuggington
- Koko, a character from Zatch Bell!
- Koko Hekmatyar, a character from Jormungand
- Koko, a character from The Lego Ninjago Movie

== Other uses ==
- Koko (novel), a 1988 novel by Peter Straub
- KoKo (computer virus), a memory resident computer virus
- Koko: A Red Dog Story, a documentary based on the dog Koko
- Koko: A Talking Gorilla, a documentary based on the gorilla Koko
- Kommerzielle Koordinierung, a secret commercial enterprise in East Germany, run by the Stasi officer Alexander Schalck-Golodkowski
- Albizia lebbeck or Koko, a species of tree
- Gege (title) or Ko-ko, a Manchu title
- ǂKxʼauǁʼein languages or Koko
- Tapu Koko, a Generation VII Pokémon
- Kōkō, short for Kōtōgakkō, meaning a high school. See Secondary education in Japan
- Koko (millet porridge)
- KOKO Networks, cooking fuel and equipment company headquartered in Kenya

== See also ==
- Coco (disambiguation)
- Cocoa (disambiguation)
- Koco (born c 1975), lead guitarist of the 2006 Indian rock band Agnee
- Koko Guyot, an underwater volcano
- Koukou (disambiguation)
- Kokos, the diminutive form of the name George in Greek
- Koko, the diminutive form of the name Grigor or Krikor in Armenian
