= Kuku =

Kuku may refer to:

== People ==
- Emir-Usein Kuku (born 1976), Crimean Tatar human rights defender
- John Dean Kuku (born 1963), Solomon Islands politician
- Kuku people, an ethnic group in South Sudan
- Kuku Yulanji, an Aboriginal people of the Daintree region in North Queensland, Australia
- Kuku (gamer), a Filipino professional Dota 2 player

== Places ==
- Kuku, Algeria, a village in Tizi Ouzou Province, former capital of the Kingdom of Kuku
- Kingdom of Kuku, a 16th–17th century Kabyle kingdom in Algeria
- Kuku, Estonia, a village in Estonia
- Kuku, Iran, a village in Kermanshah Province, Iran
- Kükü, Azerbaijan

== Radio ==
- KUKU (AM) (1330 AM), a defunct radio station in Willow Springs, Missouri, U.S.
- KUKU-FM (100.3 FM), a radio station in Willow Springs, Missouri, U.S.
- Radio Kuku in Estonia, established in 1992

== Other ==
- Kuku 3D, 1 2013 Slovak stereoscopic movie
- Kuku dialect, the language of the Kuku people
- Kuku (food), a Persian and Azerbaijani omelette
- Kuku (music), the title of a traditional piece of music from the West African nations
- Perna canaliculus, a mussel also known as kuku
- Kuku, a South African slang word for the female genitalia

== See also ==
- KooKoo, a 1981 album by Debbie Harry
- KooKoo (ice hockey club), a Finnish team
- Cuckoo, a family of birds
- Koukou (disambiguation)
- KUKU (disambiguation)
- Kukus, German name of Kuks, a village in the Czech Republic
- Kukuš, a city in Central Macedonia, Greece
- Kuki, an ethnic group in India, Bangladesh, and Myanmar
