= International Shoe Company Building =

International Shoe Company Building may refer to the following places:

- City Museum (St. Louis, Missouri), former ISC building in St. Louis
- International Shoe Company Building (St. Clair, Missouri), listed on the National Register of Historic Places
- International Shoe Company Building (West Plains, Missouri), listed on the National Register of Historic Places
- Lemp Brewery, former brewery used by ISC in St. Louis
- Roberts, Johnson and Rand-International Shoe Company Complex, listed on the National Register of Historic Places.
