= Koko River =

Koko River may refer to:

- Koko River, Rusizi District, a river in the Rusizi District of southwestern Rwanda that is a right-hand tributary of the Ruhwa River
- Koko River, Rutsiro District, a river in the Rutsiro District of western Rwanda that flows into Lake Kivu

== See also ==
- Koko (disambiguation)
