= KUKU =

KUKU may refer to:

- KUKU-FM, a radio station (100.3 FM) licensed to Willow Springs, Missouri, United States
- KUKU (AM), a defunct radio station (1330 AM) formerly licensed to Willow Springs, Missouri
- The Cuckoo Hour, a 1930s’ radio comedy which took place at the titular KUKU
