= Saint Clair, Missouri =

St. Clair
- City
- St. Clair, Missouri
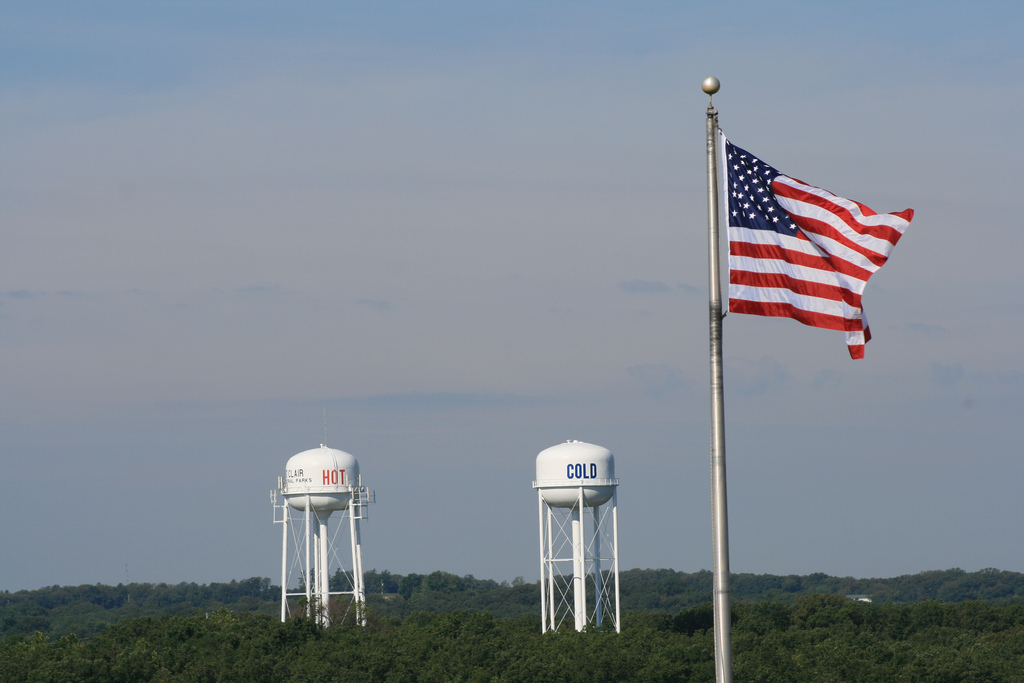
- Downtown Saint Clair International Shoe Company Building Saint Clair's Water Towers

- Location within the state of Missouri
- Coordinates: 38°20′43″N 90°58′52″W
- Country: United States
- State: Missouri
- County: Franklin

Government
  - Type: Municipality
  - Mayor: Brad Dulworth

Area
  - Total: 4.79 sq mi (12.41 km^{2})
  - Land: 4.78 sq mi (12.37 km^{2})
  - Water: 0.012 sq mi (0.03 km^{2})
- Elevation: 699 ft (213 m)

Population (2020)
  - Total: 4,791
  - Density: 1,002.9/sq mi (387.22/km^{2})
- Time zone: UTC-6 (Central (CST))
  - Summer (DST): UTC-5 (CST)
- ZIP codes: 63077
- FIPS code: 29-64136
- GNIS feature ID: 2396481
- Website: http://stclairmo.us/

St. Clair is a city in Franklin County, Missouri, United States. The population was 4,791 at the 2020 census.

== Geography ==
St. Clair is located between the Meramec River to the southeast and the Bourbeuse River to the northwest. Interstate 44 passes along the northwest side of the city and Missouri Routes 30 and 47 both pass through the city. Union is approximately six miles north along Route 47 and Stanton is about eight miles to the southwest on I-44. Parkway is on Route 30, just southeast of the city.

According to the United States Census Bureau, the city has a total area of 3.71 square miles (9.61 km^{2}), of which 3.70 square miles (9.58 km^{2}) is land and 0.01 square miles (0.03 km^{2}) is water.

== History ==
An early variant name was "Travelers Repose". St. Clair was platted in 1859 when the railroad was extended to that point. The present name is after a railroad official with the surname St. Clair.

The International Shoe Company Building and Panhorst Feed Store are listed on the National Register of Historic Places.

== Demographics ==
Historical population
Census	Pop.	Note	%±
1880	217		—
1890	208		−4.1%
1900	189		−9.1%
1910	397		110.1%
1920	442		11.3%
1930	1,135		156.8%
1940	1,410		24.2%
1950	1,779		26.2%
1960	2,711		52.4%
1970	2,978		9.8%
1980	3,485		17.0%
1990	3,917		12.4%
2000	4,390		12.1%
2010	4,724		7.6%
2020	4,791		1.4%
U.S. Decennial Census

=== 2010 census ===
As of the census of 2010, there were 4,724 people, 1,908 households, and 1,136 families living in the city. The population density was 1,276.8 inhabitants per square mile (493.0/km^{2}). There were 2,142 housing units at an average density of 578.9 per square mile (223.5/km^{2}). The racial makeup of the city was 96.9% White, 1.0% African American, 0.3% Native American, 0.1% Asian, 0.3% from other races, and 1.4% from two or more races. Hispanic or Latino of any race were 1.2% of the population.

There were 1,908 households, of which 34.2% had children under the age of 18 living with them, 37.5% were married couples living together, 16.1% had a female householder with no husband present, 5.9% had a male householder with no wife present, and 40.5% were non-families. 33.5% of all households were made up of individuals, and 13.8% had someone living alone who was 65 years of age or older. The average household size was 2.43 and the average family size was 3.11.

The median age in the city was 33.1 years. 26.6% of residents were under the age of 18; 10.6% were between the ages of 18 and 24; 27.1% were from 25 to 44; 23% were from 45 to 64; and 12.8% were 65 years of age or older. The gender makeup of the city was 47.1% male and 52.9% female.

Since 2005 the unemployment rate in St. Clair, Missouri has ranged from 4.4% in April 2007 to 13.3% in January 2009. The current unemployment rate for St. Clair is 6.1% in December 2014.

Statistics found on city-data.com showed that 69.7% of the population completed high school, 6.5% achieved a bachelor's degree, and only 2.5% achieved a graduate degree.

=== 2000 census ===
As of the census of 2000, there were 4,390 people, 1,765 households, and 1,143 families living in the city. The population density was 1,404.3 inhabitants per square mile (542.2/km^{2}). There were 1,900 housing units at an average density of 607.8 per square mile (234.7/km^{2}). The racial makeup of the city was 97.45% White, 0.75% African American, 0.46% Native American, 0.21% Asian, 0.09% from other races, and 1.05% from two or more races. Hispanic or Latino of any race were 0.71% of the population.

There were 1,765 households, out of which 35.1% had children under the age of 18 living with them, 45.2% were married couples living together, 14.2% had a female householder with no husband present, and 35.2% were non-families. 30.4% of all households were made up of individuals, and 14.0% had someone living alone who was 65 years of age or older. The average household size was 2.44 and the average family size was 3.05.

In the city, the population was spread out, with 27.9% under the age of 18, 10.8% from 18 to 24, 29.6% from 25 to 44, 18.0% from 45 to 64, and 13.7% who were 65 years of age or older. The median age was 32 years. For every 100 females, there were 88.5 males. For every 100 females age 18 and over, there were 82.5 males.

The median income for a household in the city was $35,716, and the median income for a family was $41,939. Males had a median income of $35,509 versus $23,986 for females. The per capita income for the city was $18,101. About 8.6% of families and 10.6% of the population were below the poverty line, including 10.2% of those under age 18 and 10.1% of those age 65 or over.

== Education ==
The St. Clair School District covers the area of St. Clair and some of the surrounding areas. The district consists of four schools: St. Clair High School, St. Clair Junior High School, St. Clair Edgar Murray Elementary School, and St. Clair Elementary. Other schools include Cornerstone Christian Academy.

St. Clair has a public library, a branch of the Scenic Regional Library system.

== Notable person ==
- Phoebe Hearst, mother of William Randolph Hearst, was born in St. Clair.

== National Register of Historic Places ==
- International Shoe Company Building
- Panhorst Feed Store
