= KSPQ =

- West Plains, Missouri; United States
- Frequency: 93.9 MHz
- Branding: Q94

Programming
- Format: Classic rock

Ownership
- Owner: Greg Hoskins; (Better Newspapers, Inc.)
- Sister stations: KKDY, KUKU-FM, KUPH, KWPM

History
- First air date: 1952
- Former call signs: KWPM-FM (1952–1988)
- Former frequencies: 97.3 MHz (1952–1957)

Technical information
- Licensing authority: FCC
- Facility ID: 47951
- Class: C1
- ERP: 100,000 watts
- HAAT: 198 meters (650 ft)
- Transmitter coordinates: 37°00′12″N 91°54′24″W

Links
- Public license information: Public file; LMS
- Website: kspq.com

KSPQ (93.9 FM, "Q94") is a radio station licensed to serve West Plains, Missouri, United States. The station is owned by Greg Hoskins, through licensee Better Newspapers, Inc.

KSPQ broadcasts a classic rock format branded as "Q94".

KSPQ is the local affiliate for the Nights with Alice Cooper radio show, hosted by longtime singer/songwriter Alice Cooper. As well, as the Mizzou Tigers basketball programming.

The station was assigned the KSPQ call sign by the Federal Communications Commission on January 1, 1988.
