= KKDY =

- West Plains, Missouri; United States
- Frequency: 102.5 MHz
- Branding: Hot Country 102.5

Programming
- Format: Country

Ownership
- Owner: Greg Hoskins; (Better Newspapers, Inc.)
- Sister stations: KSPQ, KUKU-FM, KUPH, KWPM

History
- First air date: March 31, 1984
- Former frequencies: 102.3 MHz (1984–1994)

Technical information
- Licensing authority: FCC
- Facility ID: 39544
- Class: C2
- ERP: 50,000 watts
- HAAT: 148 meters (486 feet)
- Transmitter coordinates: 36°41′22″N 91°53′45″W

Links
- Public license information: Public file; LMS
- Website: http://www.kkdy.com/index.php

KKDY (102.5 FM, "Hot Country 102.5") is a radio station licensed in West Plains, Missouri. The station is owned by Greg Hoskins, through licensee Better Newspapers, Inc. It airs a country music format. KKDY's signal can be heard from Seymour, Missouri to Doniphan, Missouri.

== History ==
KKDY signed on the air at 102.3 FM on March 31, 1984, running a Top 40/CHR format for the station's first ten years in operation serving Southern Missouri and Northern Arkansas. The station's frequency moved to 102.5 FM in December 1989, retaining its CHR format. The station continued to run Top 40 until 1994 when the station dropped CHR for its current country format.
