= KUPH =

- Mountain View, Missouri; United States
- Broadcast area: West Plains, Missouri; Houston, Missouri; Mountain Grove, Missouri
- Frequency: 96.9 MHz
- Branding: 96.9 The Fox

Programming
- Format: Contemporary hit radio
- Affiliations: Fox News Radio

Ownership
- Owner: Greg Hoskins; (Better Newspapers, Inc.)
- Sister stations: KKDY, KSPQ, KUKU-FM, KWPM

History
- First air date: July 31, 1998
- Former call signs: KXOZ (1988–1997); KCUF (1997)

Technical information
- Licensing authority: FCC
- Facility ID: 29625
- Class: C2
- ERP: 50,000 watts
- HAAT: 150 meters (490 ft)
- Transmitter coordinates: 36°59′28″N 91°47′41″W

Links
- Public license information: Public file; LMS
- Webcast: Listen live
- Website: thefox969radio.com

KUPH is a radio station airing a Top 40 (CHR) format licensed to Mountain View, Missouri, broadcasting on 96.9 FM. The station is owned by Greg Hoskins, through licensee Better Newspapers, Inc.
