= Koukou =

Koukou may refer to:

== People ==
- Emperor Kōkō (830–887), 58th emperor of Japan
- George Koukou (born 1945), Liberian politician
- Djiman Koukou (born 1990), Beninese footballer

== Places ==
- Kuku, Algeria
- Kingdom of Kuku, a medieval Berber kingdom
- Koukou, Togo
- Koukou Angarana, Chad

== See also ==
- Koko (disambiguation)
- Kuku (disambiguation)
