= KUKU (AM) =

Willow Springs, Missouri; United States
- Broadcast area: Howell County, Missouri
- Frequency: 1330 kHz
- Branding: Ozark Regional NewsTalk

Programming
- Language: English
- Format: Defunct (formerly News/Talk)
- Affiliations: Citadel Media, Westwood One, Premiere Networks

Ownership
- Owner: Missouri Ozarks Radio Network, Inc.
- Sister stations: KUKU-FM, KWPM

History
- First air date: October 1957

Technical information
- Facility ID: 50348
- Class: D
- Power: 1,000 watts (day); 52 watts (night)
- Transmitter coordinates: 36°58′47″N 91°59′29″W

KUKU (1330 AM, "Ozark Regional NewsTalk") was an American radio station licensed to serve the community of Willow Springs, Missouri. The station, established in 1957, was owned and operated by Missouri Ozarks Radio Network, Inc. It broadcast a news/talk radio format in conjunction with sister station KWPM (1450 AM).

The station's license was cancelled on November 21, 2014 after it had been silent since March 2013.
