= Panhorst Feed Store =

- U.S. National Register of Historic Places
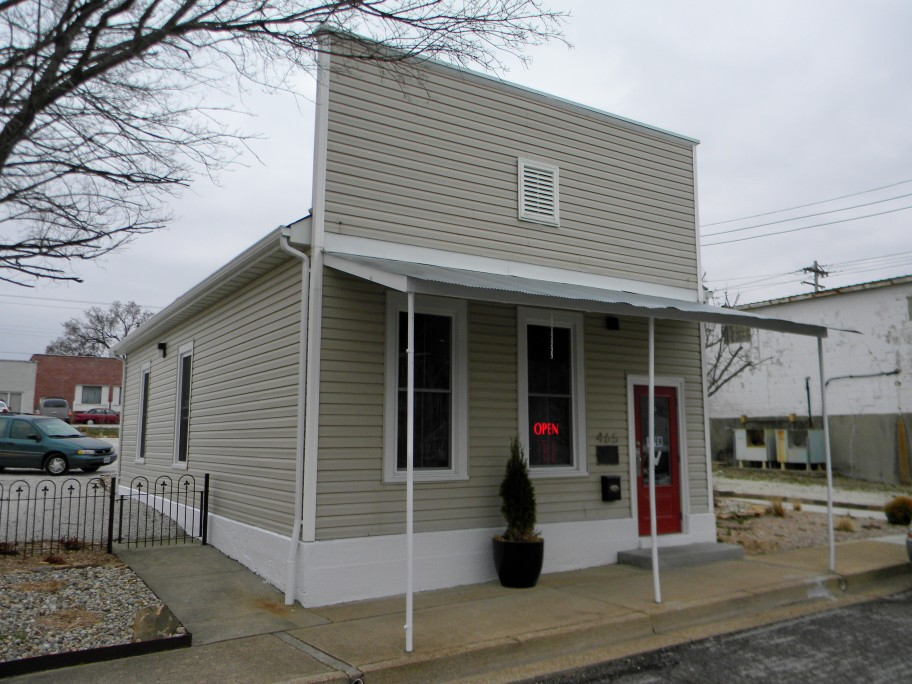
- Panhorst Feed Store, March 2014

- Location within Missouri Location within the United States
- Location: 465 St. Clair St., St. Clair, Missouri
- Coordinates: 38°20′49″N 90°58′56″W
- Area: 1 acre (0.40 ha)
- Built: 1917-1918
- Built by: Dierking, John
- Architectural style: Commercial block
- NRHP reference No.: 90001023
- Added to NRHP: July 5, 1990

Panhorst Feed Store is a historic commercial building located at St. Clair, Franklin County, Missouri. It was built in 1917–1918, and is a one-story, vernacular wood-frame building. The building measures approximately 20 feet wide by 40 feet deep and has a gable roof with false front.

It was listed on the National Register of Historic Places in 1990.
