= Courthouse Square Historic District (West Plains, Missouri) =

Historic district in Missouri, United States

- U.S. National Register of Historic Places
- U.S. Historic district
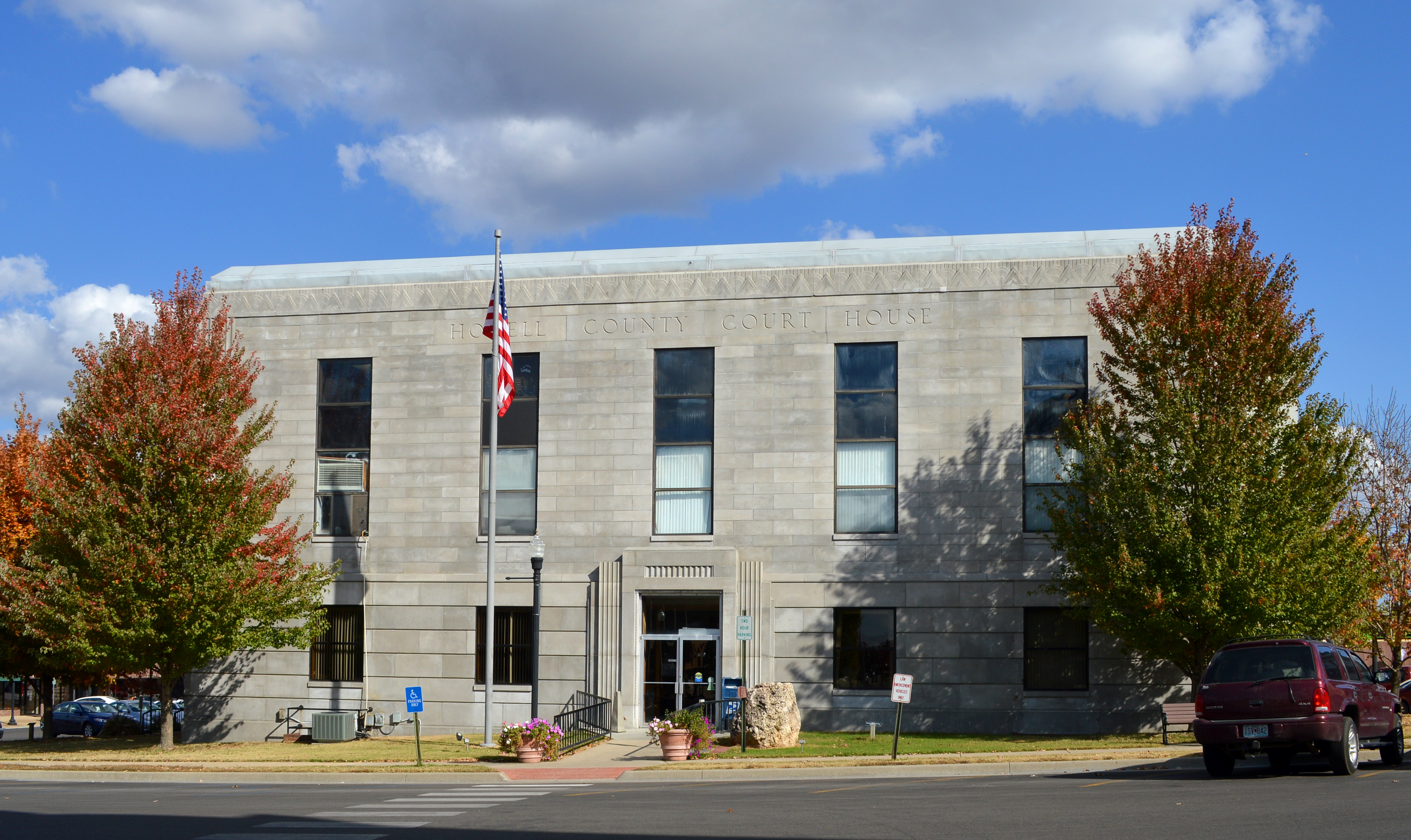
- Howell County Courthouse, October 2015

- Location within Missouri Location within the United States
- Location: Roughly bounded by Broadway, Grove St., Court Sq. and Washington Ave., West Plains, Missouri
- Coordinates: 36°43′43″N 91°51′08″W
- Area: 11.5 acres (4.7 ha)
- Built: 1881
- Architect: Hawkins, Earl; Britton, L.H.
- Architectural style: Italianate, Queen Anne, Romanesque, Late Gothic Revival, Art Deco
- MPS: West Plains, Missouri MPS
- NRHP reference No.: 03000651
- Added to NRHP: July 17, 2003

Courthouse Square Historic District is a national historic district located at West Plains, Howell County, Missouri. The district encompasses 46 contributing buildings in the central business district of West Plains. It developed between about 1881 and 1950 and includes representative examples of Italianate, Queen Anne, Romanesque Revival, Late Gothic Revival, and Art Deco style architecture. Located in the district are the separately listed Elledge Arcade Buildings, W. J. and Ed Smith Building, and West Plains Bank Building. Other notable buildings include the IOOF Building #2 (c. 1923), First Presbyterian Church (c. 1887, 1910, 1978), Howell County Courthouse (1937), Aid Hardware Building (1914-1915), W. N. Evans Building (c. 1892), J. R. Foster Building (c. 1929), Foster-Renfrew Building (c. 1919), Alsup, Risley & Skillman Block (c. 1887), Catron Opera House / Johnson Opera House (1893), IOOF Building / J. R. Galloway Building (1896), Evans Theatre (c. 1899, 1913), W. J. Zorn Building, #1/Howell County Gazette Building (1911-1912), West Plains Fire Department/City Hall (1917), and Avenue Theatre (1950).

It was listed on the National Register of Historic Places in 2003.
