= Lincoln School (West Plains, Missouri) =

- U.S. National Register of Historic Places
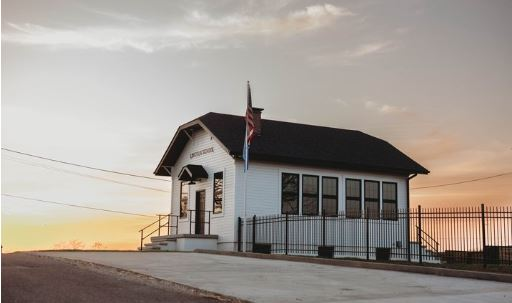

- Location within Missouri Location within the United States
- Location: 1400 E. Pony Thomas Street, West Plains, Missouri.
- Coordinates: 36°44′30″N 91°51′8″W
- Built: 1926
- NRHP reference No.: 100011398
- Added to NRHP: 2025-01-29

The Lincoln School is a one-room schoolhouse built in 1926, when West Plains' schools were segregated. West Plains' Black children were educated in it until 1954, when Brown v. Board of Education required integration, and Lincoln's students were distributed among West Plains' White schools.

Starting in 2023 the school was restored to serve as a reminder of the segregation era, and for use as community meeting place. In 2025 Lincoln School was listed on the National Register of Historic Places, considered locally significant as "the only known extant historic African American school house in West Plains - if not Howell County."

== Background ==
Slavery was legal in Missouri in 1839, when Josiah Howell settled on the prairie that would become West Plains. It was legal as a result of the Missouri Compromise of 1820, and remained so after the Compromise was overruled by Dred Scott v. Sandford in 1857. By the start of the Civil War in 1861, 36 enslaved people lived in Howell County. During the war Howell County was contested territory - the site of skirmishes between Union and Confederate forces. By the end, West Plains was burned and most of its residents had fled. At the end of that war, delegates to Missouri's 1865 Constitutional Convention overwhelmingly voted to abolish slavery in the state.

During the Reconstruction era and the early Jim Crow era after the war, Black people moved in and out of West Plains. Unlike some towns, West Plains did not enact sundown laws to prevent minorities from living there. It is believed that a small wagon-train of Black farmers arrived in 1869 from Bedford County, Tennessee - led by Bobos and Farrars - and they started a Missionary Baptist Church in 1870. Starting around 1883 B.F. Olden brought in Black workers from Oxford, Mississippi to clear land for the huge fruit orchards he was starting. Many of them stayed to work for Olden, some homesteaded, and some worked for the railroad. Some of the early residents were Liza and Pony Thomas and the Campbells. By the late 1800s a majority-Black neighborhood had formed in the northeast part of town, extending north of town into Dry Creek township. This was the only Black community in Howell County, and it was never large. Not all was harmonious; there was fear of racial violence, particularly around 1900, culminating when many Black people briefly fled the town during a false alarm in 1903, months after a Black man was lynched in Joplin and a mob burned homes of Black residents there.

Education of Blacks was forbidden by law in Missouri in 1847. That changed after the Civil War, when access to schools was required for all from 5 to 21 years of age. Missouri did relatively well in providing these schools; it was said that in 1870 it had "the largest proportion of schools for negro children" among the former slave states. But for Black children that meant separate schools - segregated from White students by law. These separate Black schools had little to work with and not enough teachers. In many small towns and rural places, they met in homes, converted homes, or churches. West Plains' Black community didn't have a purpose-built schoolhouse for 25 years. The U.S. Supreme Court confirmed this state of affairs in 1896 with Plessy v. Ferguson, supporting segregation as long as the facilities for each race were of equal quality.

The reality was that in many places they were not equal. For example, in some places a district built a new school for the White students and the Black students moved into the old school. Along the same lines, many Black schools were supplied with cast-off books from their White neighbors. Herbert Elett of Excelsior Springs recalled, "It's like this--one page may have 'little boy blue come blow your horn...' You'd turn the page and the rest of the story wouldn't be there — we never got the whole story." Clyde Generley of Union recounted, "if we had a page missing then we'd look over on someone else and they'd do the same — we got the lesson, but we had to work at it."

== Lincoln School ==
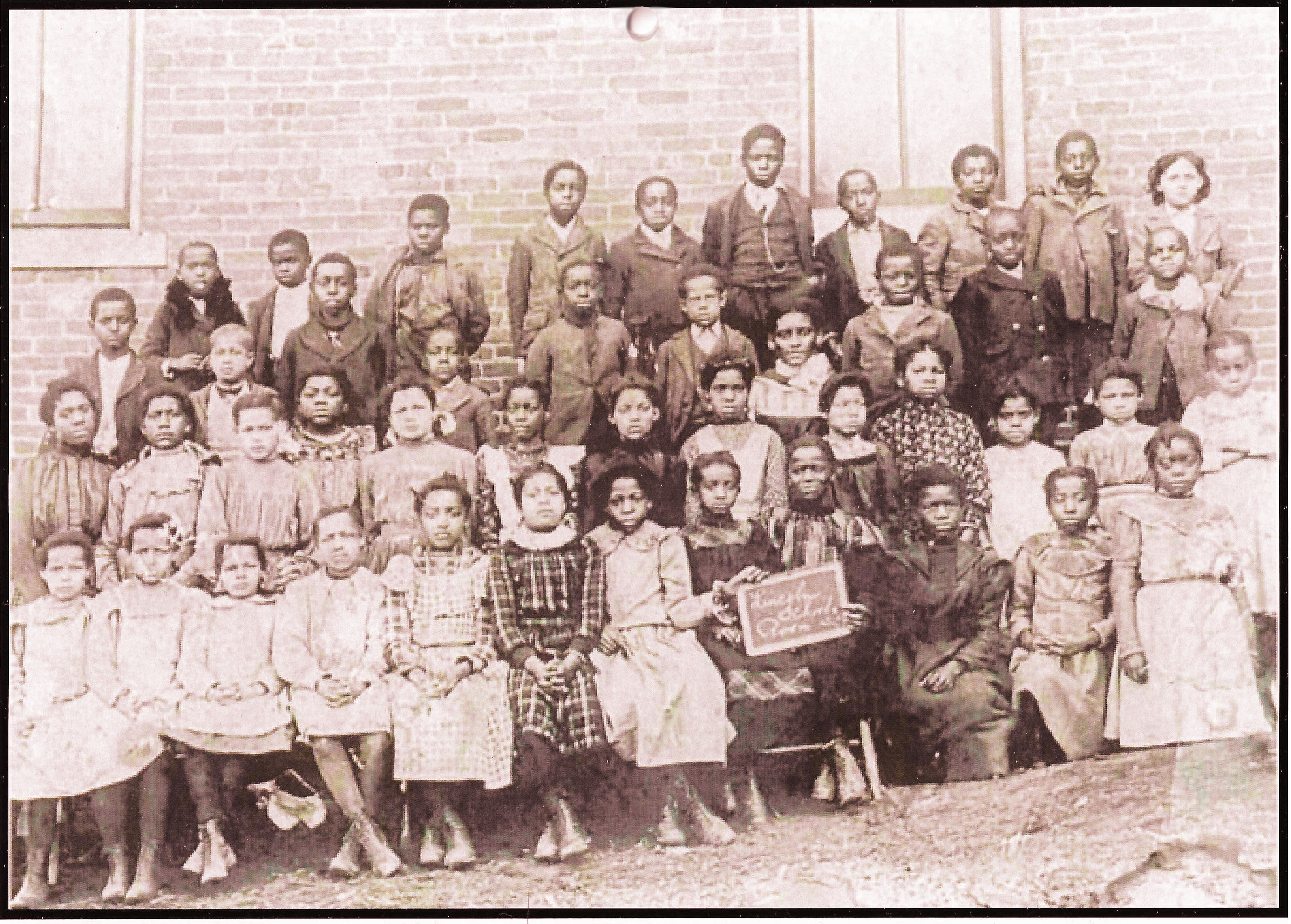
Students and teacher in 1901

Around 1890 the first Lincoln School was built, somewhere in the North Washington Avenue neighborhood. That first building was wooden, and reportedly smaller and less well-built than the current school.

In 1926 the present building was constructed - built by Black residents of the district. It is a one-story, one-room school building on a poured concrete foundation - like many other schools of the era - with a clipped gable roof with knee brackets under the end-eaves. It had large windows on the east wall to light the students' work before electric lights - none on the west. Inside were desks and blackboards. In winter the building was heated by a coal furnace in the basement, with a brick chimney passing up through the back of the classroom.

The playground was simple. East of the building was a swing set and to the northwest a baseball diamond. The school initially had no indoor plumbing, with only a privy behind the school. In 1949 plumbing was added and toilets were installed in the basement.

A typical day started with the Pledge of Allegiance around the flagpole and singing of Lift Every Voice and Sing. All the students from grades 1 to 8 were in the one classroom, with one teacher leading them all, except during a period in the 1930s when there may have been two teachers.

Teachers at Lincoln
Years	Teacher
1926–30	Lulu McKee
1931–41	Louriece Penn
unknown	Mary Adams
1942	Lois E. Young
1943–44	Edyth Cooper
1944–45	Mary Margaret Givehand
1946–47	Mary Reynolds
1948–50	Bettye Wilson
1951	Theodore McCroskey
1949–52	Dorothy Tiddle
1953–54	Houston Ellis

Lincoln School was a gathering place for its community, hosting picnics, ball games, and Christmas programs. When the school building didn't have enough space for large school events, they were often held at Mt. Olive Baptist Church a block to the south. Eighth-grade commencements were held at a nearby White school.

West Plains' high school didn't admit Black students, so to continue education, an 8th grade graduate of Lincoln would have to transfer to a Black high school in a place like Springfield or Kansas City. Most graduates simply stopped school at grade eight.

In 1954 Brown v. Board of Education required the end of segregation in schools. Some Missouri school districts delayed integration for almost ten years, but West Plains didn't. In 1955 Lincoln School was closed, its students dispersed to West Plains' previously White elementary schools. For decades after, the Lincoln School building was used as a meeting hall for a VFW post, the 4-H Program and for Alcoholics Anonymous.

== Restoration ==
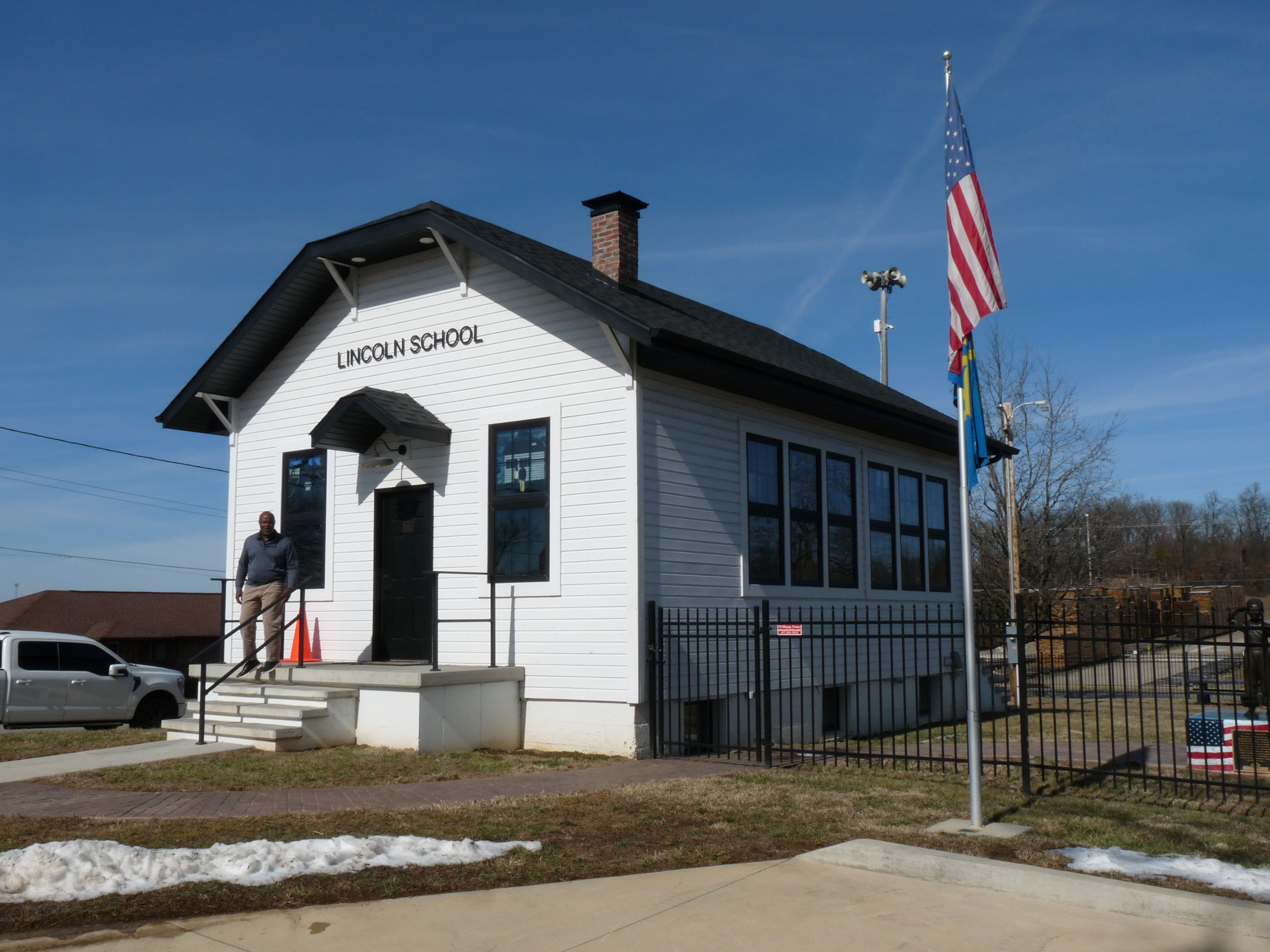
After restoration in 2026, with Crockett Oaks III on the porch

In 2023 Crockett W. Oaks III and Tonya Oaks bought the school from the city, aiming to use it as a community meeting place and to teach about segregation and Black history in West Plains. (Crockett's father completed two years of schooling at Lincoln in its last years of operation.) They completed renovated of the building on January 15, 2024. After 60 years of other uses, most of the school furnishings were gone, but the building's frame, floor, foundation and brick chimney remained and were preserved. The weatherboard siding was repaired and painted. The original windows had been replaced with smaller ones, but at the renovation, new windows were added which match the original size.

Instead of clear glass panes, the replacement windows were filled with stained-glass panels with historic and inspirational images. On the walls are a painted mural by Dr. Bolaji Ogunwo showing the classroom when the school was in operation, and another by Paul Jones showing the playground and surroundings during recess.

The school's old playground was reconfigured into a park called Reflection Plaza, with two statues entitled, "Feel the Love" and "I, Too, Am America" reflect the resilience of the people who were shaped by Lincoln School.

== Significance ==
Lincoln School is the only remaining Black school in West Plains and Howell County. Sixty years after school segregation, few relics of that era remain. Lincoln School typifies a segregation-era African-American schoolhouse in its simple form and in its name Lincoln, which led Douglass, Washington, Carver among common names for Black schools. Given this, it represents segregation-era schools beyond Howell County.
