= Julio Sosa (guitarist) =

Argentine guitarist and composer

Julio "Koko" Sosa is a master guitarist and composer from Ucacha (Cordoba Province), Argentina. His performances and compositions range from Argentine styles (such as Tango, Milonga, Chamame, Zamba, Tonada, and Aires Criollos) to Latin Jazz, Flamenco and Brazilian styles (such as Samba and Bossa Nova).

== Career ==
Sosa performed throughout Latin America and the United States, including performances at the White House and the Kennedy Center in Washington, D.C., and was for many years an instructor at the Guitar Gallery in Washington, D.C. Hailing from Argentina, he was known in South America as "Koko Sosa" (not to be mistaken for producer and actor Manueal "Coco" Sosa). He specialized in Argentine idioms like the Tango, Milonga, Chamame, Zamba, Tonada, and Aires Criollos. Among well-known figures he worked with in South America were the legendary Argentinian singer-songwriter Mercedes Sosa (not a relation). He died in Washington D.C. in 2014.
