= Kokõ =

Village in Estonia

- Village
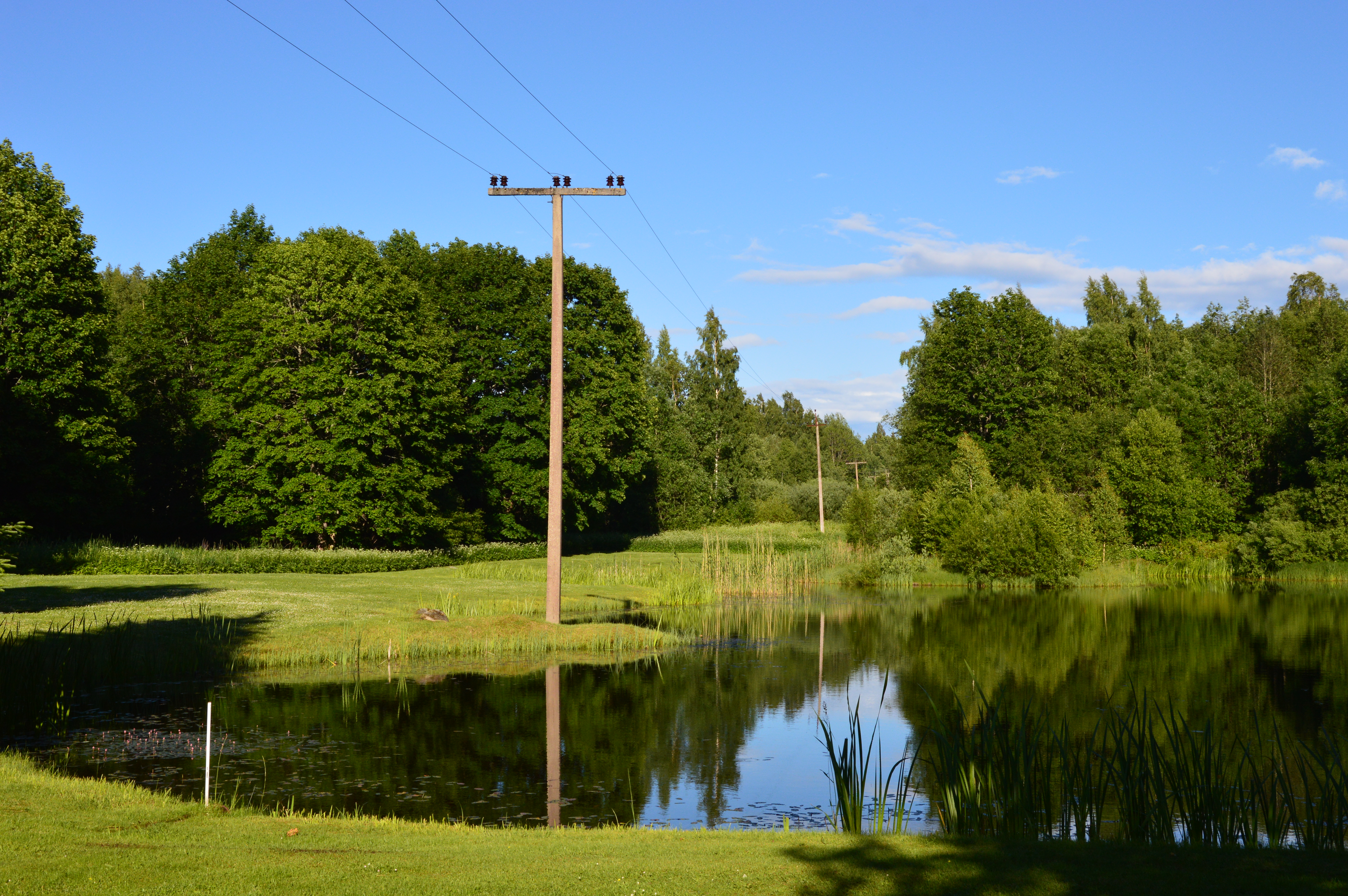
- Kokõ pond

- Location within Estonia
- Coordinates: 57.736944444444°N 26.981111111111°E
- Country: Estonia
- County: Võru County
- Parish: Rõuge Parish
- Time zone: UTC+2 (EET)
  - Summer (DST): UTC+3 (EEST)

Kokõ is a village in Rõuge Parish, Võru County in Estonia.

== Gallery ==
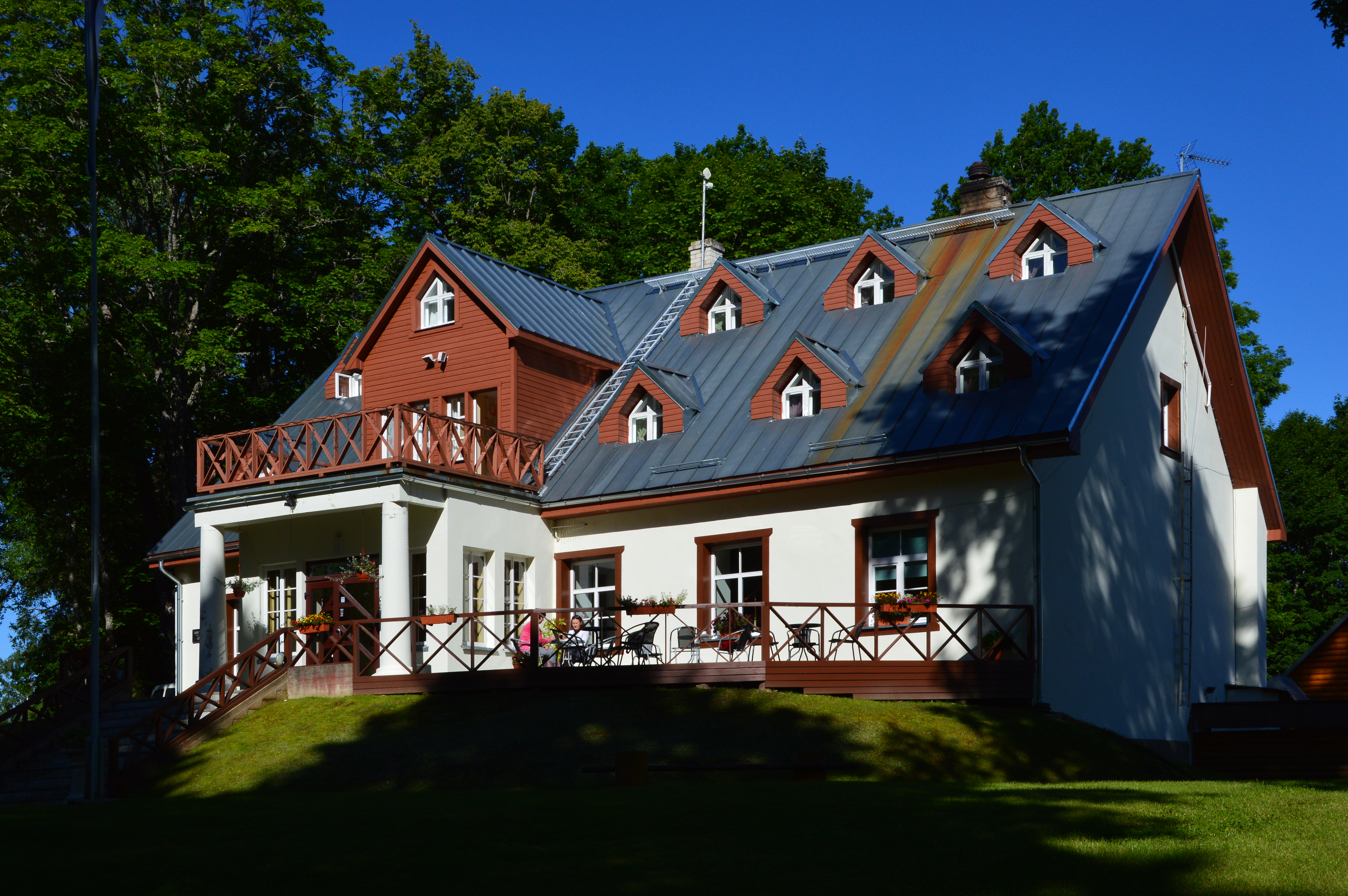
Former schoolhouse

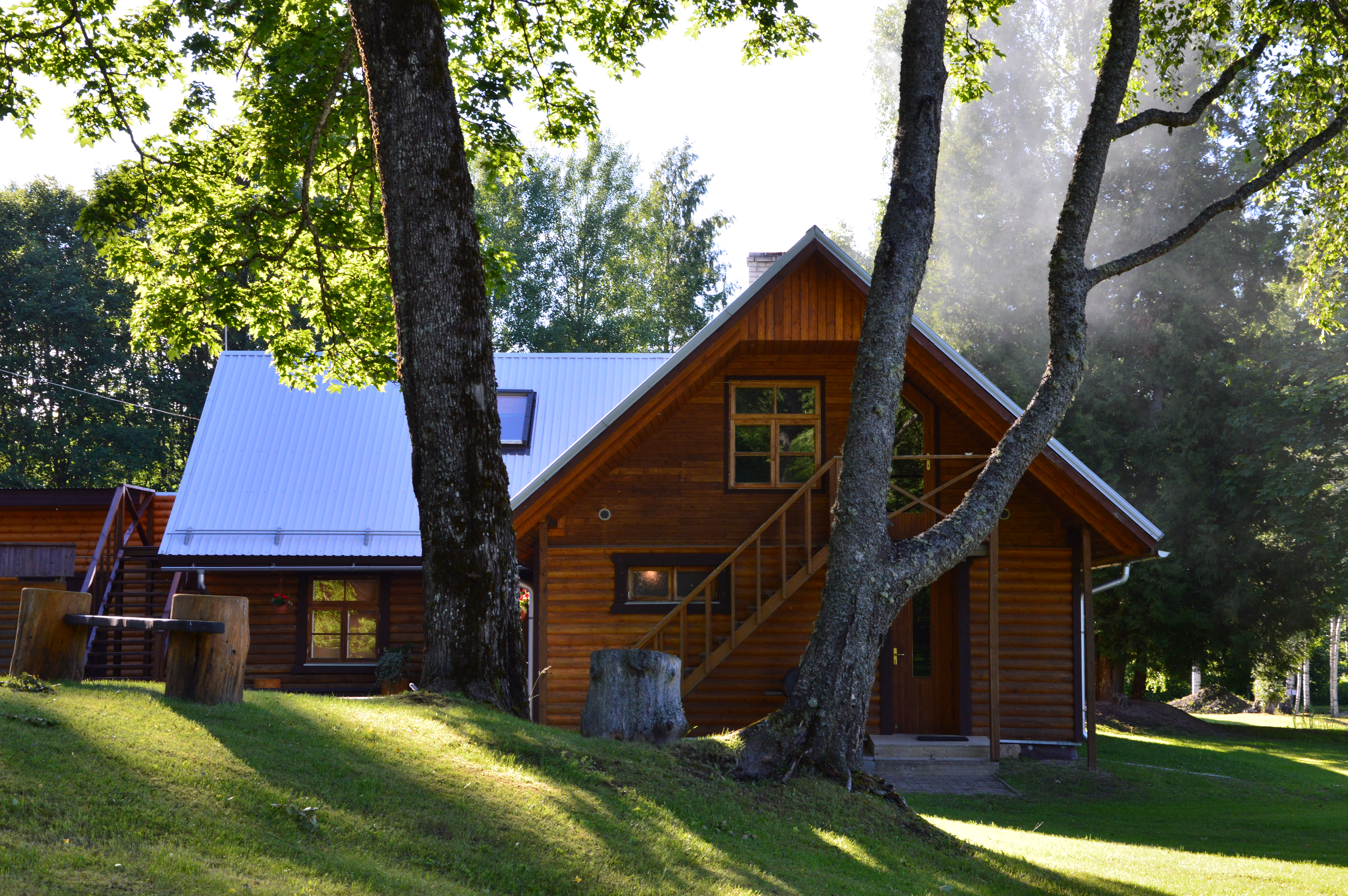
Sauna
