= Kuku 3D =

Kuku 3D!
- Directed by: Henrich Zucha
- Edited by: Henrich Zucha
- Production company: Filmodrom
- Release date: December 21, 2013
- Running time: 8 minutes
- Country: Slovakia
- Language: Slovak

Kuku 3D is the first Slovak stereoscopic (3D) movie. It was released in December 2013.
