= KoKo (computer virus) =

1991 Computer Virus

Malware details
- Technical name: Koko.1780
- Classification: Computer virus

Technical details
- Platforms: Microsoft Windows, DOS
- Size: 1780
- Written in: Assembly

KoKo Virus is a memory resident computer virus believed to have been created in March 1991. KoKo's name came from the creator himself, which was a nickname used by his friends. Many on-line virus databases refer to KoKo as Koko.1780. KoKo is written in the Assembly programming language and the executable file usually has a file size of approximately 1780 bytes.

The KoKo virus infects the target system by hooking the Windows interrupt INT 21h and writing itself to the end of COM and EXE files that are executed. The payload of this virus activates on July 29 and February 15. When activated, the virus displays a message and may erase the computer's disk sectors.

The message displayed on an infected system is:

Stop Keyboard Clicking
KoKo is Sleeping in Your PC. !
To Scan & Clean Call, Adham H. Hammam
Fax & Phone (20) 066 - 261841
