= Kuku (music) =

Kuku is the title of a traditional piece of music from the West African nation of Guinea. According to Mamady Keita, its rhythm was played by women as they came back from fishing. Nowadays this music is played during parties. Some people believe that it was played by two different peoples, one of which was the Manian ethnic group in the forest region of Guinea.

== See also ==
- Music of West Africa
- African popular music
- Music of Africa
