= Kokos =

Kokos is a surname and a given name of multiple origins. Notable people with the name include

- Kokos Elia (born 1971), Cypriot footballer
- Dick Kokos, American professional baseball outfielder
- Marvin Kokos, French professional footballer

== See also ==
- Chichiş, a Romanian commune called Kökös in Hungarian
