= Demeter Koko =

Austrian artist (1891–1929)

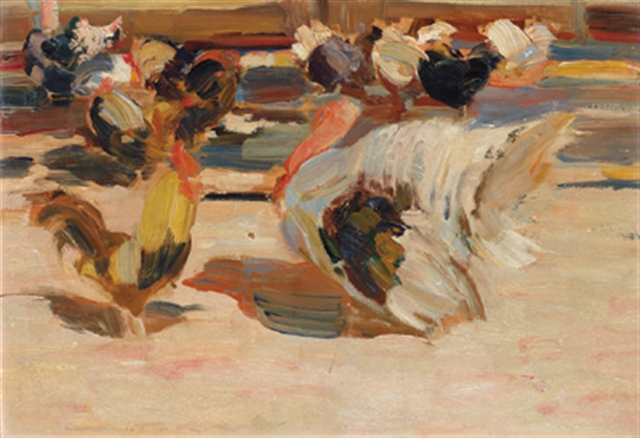
Demeter Koko: Hühner in der Mittagssonne

Demeter Koko (13 June 1891, in Linz – 27 October 1929, in Linz) was an Austrian graphic artist active in the early 20th century.

== Education ==
After completing his studies at the Linz Handelsakademie (vocational school), the 17-year-old Koko began to study painting in Linz. In Munich he perfected his style between the years 1910 and 1915 and finally returned to Linz in 1916. However his stay here was cut short as he was soon called up for military service as the First World War was raging.

== Life and work ==
He had his first exhibition in 1919, after the war had ended. This was a joint exhibition with his sister Sophie Koko. In 1921 he became a member of the Upper Austrian Artists' Society. In 1923 he developed lung disease and died of this condition in 1929.

His paintings and drawings feature landscapes, flowers, and animals. His work is featured in the Linz Nordico gallery and in the Upper Austrian State Museum.

== Memorials and Honours ==
Koko was honoured with the Staatspreis (the Austrian State Prize) in 1921. The Kokoweg (Koko's Way), a cul-de-sac northwest of the Bachlbergweg, branches off the Pöstlingberg and was named after Koko in 1958.
