= Elledge Arcade Buildings =

- U.S. National Register of Historic Places
- U.S. Historic district – Contributing property
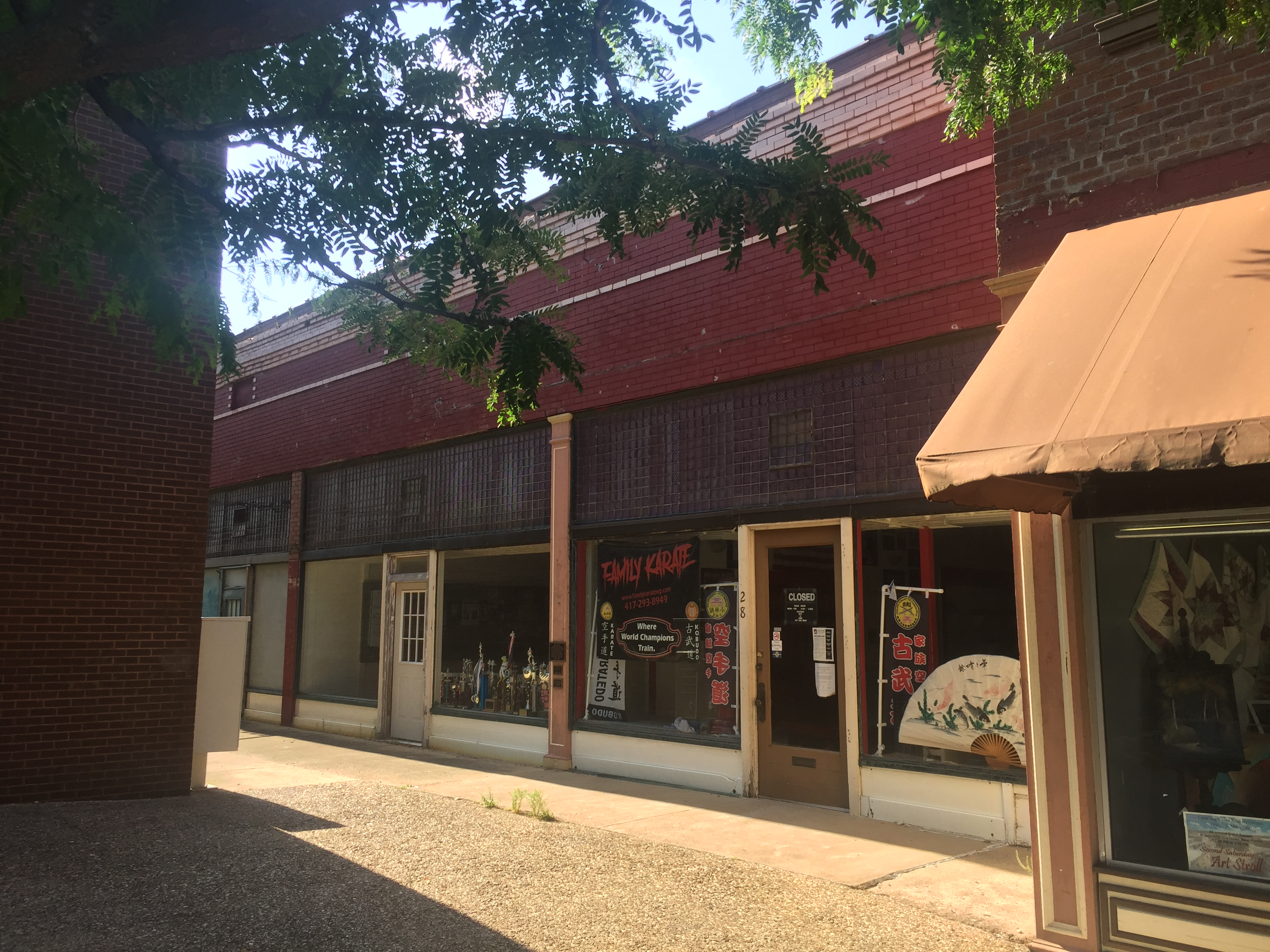

- Location within Missouri Location within the United States
- Location: 28 Court Sq. and 2 Elledge Arcade, West Plains, Missouri
- Coordinates: 36°43′43″N 91°51′10″W
- Area: less than one acre
- Built: 1913
- Architect: Skillman, Issac; Bishop, S.A.
- Architectural style: One-part commercial block
- NRHP reference No.: 01000011
- Added to NRHP: January 26, 2001

Elledge Arcade Buildings are two historic commercial buildings located at West Plains, Howell County, Missouri. They were built or remodeled in 1913, and are two one-story, brick commercial buildings known as the Famous Grocery Building (built 1888) and the J. L. Elledge Building. The two buildings share a common facade consisting of four one-story storefronts.

It was listed on the National Register of Historic Places in 2001. It is located in the Courthouse Square Historic District.
