= International Shoe Company Building (St. Clair, Missouri) =

- U.S. National Register of Historic Places
- International Shoe Company Building, October 2026

- Location within Missouri Location within the United States
- Location: 160 N. Main St., St. Clair, Missouri
- Coordinates: 38°20′55″N 90°58′49″W
- Area: less than one acre
- Built: 1922
- NRHP reference No.: 94000287
- Added to NRHP: April 7, 1994

The International Shoe Company Building is a historic shoe factory building located at 160 N. Main St. in Saint Clair, Missouri. The building was erected in 1922 as a factory for the International Shoe Company. It is a three-story, irregular-shaped building with a flat asphalt roof. It has a four-story elevator tower. The factory closed in 1982.

It has been listed on the National Register of Historic Places since April 7, 1994.
