= West Plains Bank Building =

- U.S. National Register of Historic Places
- U.S. Historic district – Contributing property
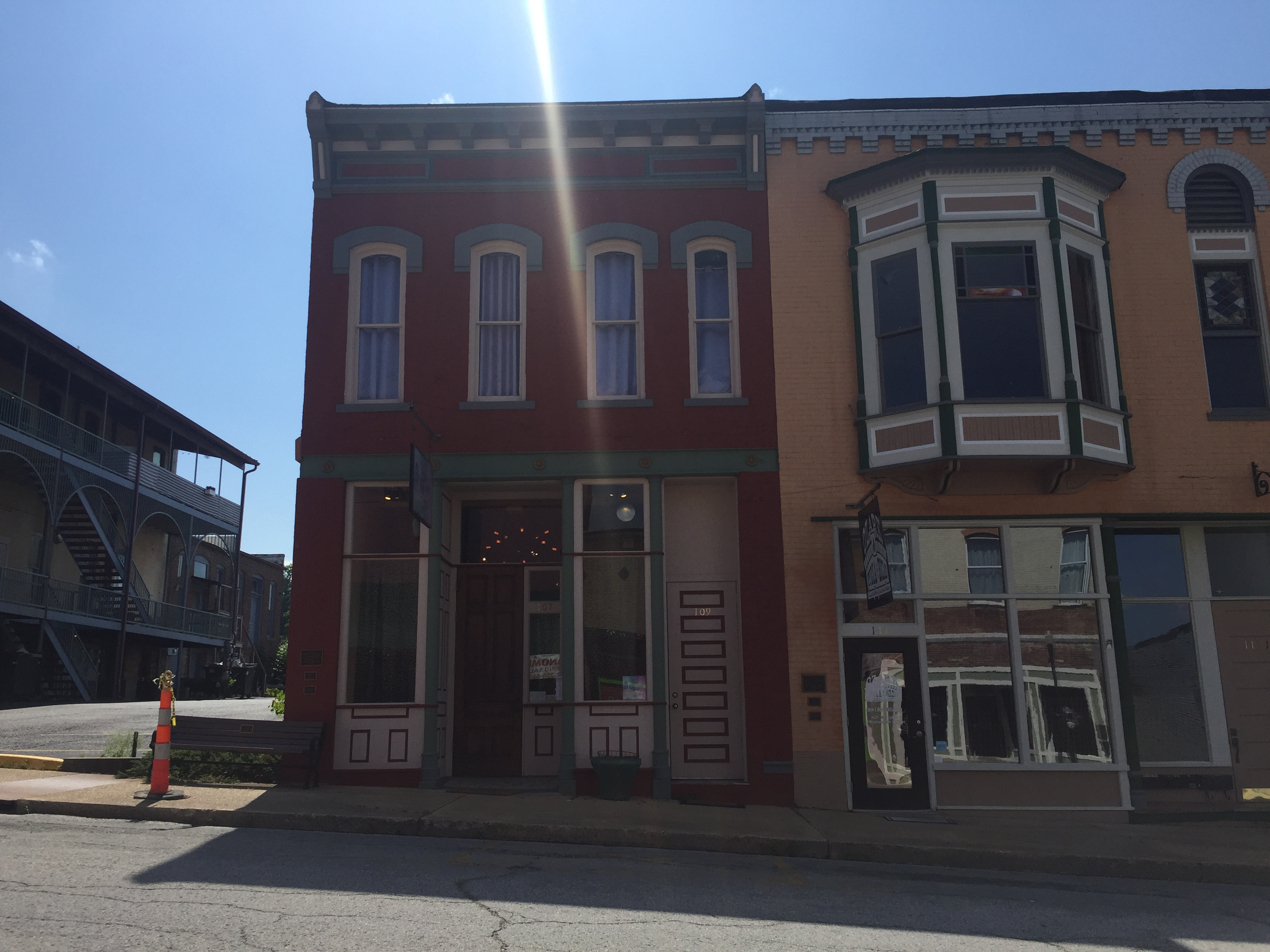
- Building in 2022

- Location within Missouri Location within the United States
- Location: 107 Washington Ave., West Plains, Missouri
- Coordinates: 36°43′44″N 91°51′9″W
- Area: less than one acre
- Built: 1883
- Architectural style: Italianate
- Part of: Courthouse Square Historic District (West Plains, Missouri) (ID03000651)
- NRHP reference No.: 01000013

Significant dates
- Added to NRHP: September 7, 2001
- Designated CP: July 17, 2003

West Plains Bank Building is a historic bank building located at West Plains, Howell County, Missouri. It was built in 1883, and is a narrow two-story, three-bay, brick commercial building with Italianate style design elements. It features a wide pressed metal cornice runs the width of the facade. It has two rear additions; one built about 1913 and the other about 1923. It is located next to the W. J. and Ed Smith Building.

It was listed on the National Register of Historic Places in 2001. It is also located in the Courthouse Square Historic District, which was NRHP-listed in 2003.
