= Mian Kabud-e Qasem =

Mian Kabud-e Qasem ميان كبودقاسم
- Village
- Location within Iran
- Coordinates: 34°26′17″N 45°56′48″E
- Country: Iran
- Province: Kermanshah
- County: Sarpol-e Zahab
- Bakhsh: Central
- Rural District: Beshiva Pataq

Population (2006)
  - Total: 114
- Time zone: UTC+3:30 (IRST)
  - Summer (DST): UTC+4:30 (IRDT)

Mian Kabud-e Qasem (Persian: ميان كبودقاسم, also Romanized as Mīān Kabūd-e Qāsem; also known as Kowkow, Kūkū, and Mīān Kabūd) is a village in Beshiva Pataq Rural District, in the Central District of Sarpol-e Zahab County, Kermanshah Province, Iran. At the 2006 census, its population was 114, in 27 families.
