= W. J. and Ed Smith Building =

- U.S. National Register of Historic Places
- U.S. Historic district – Contributing property
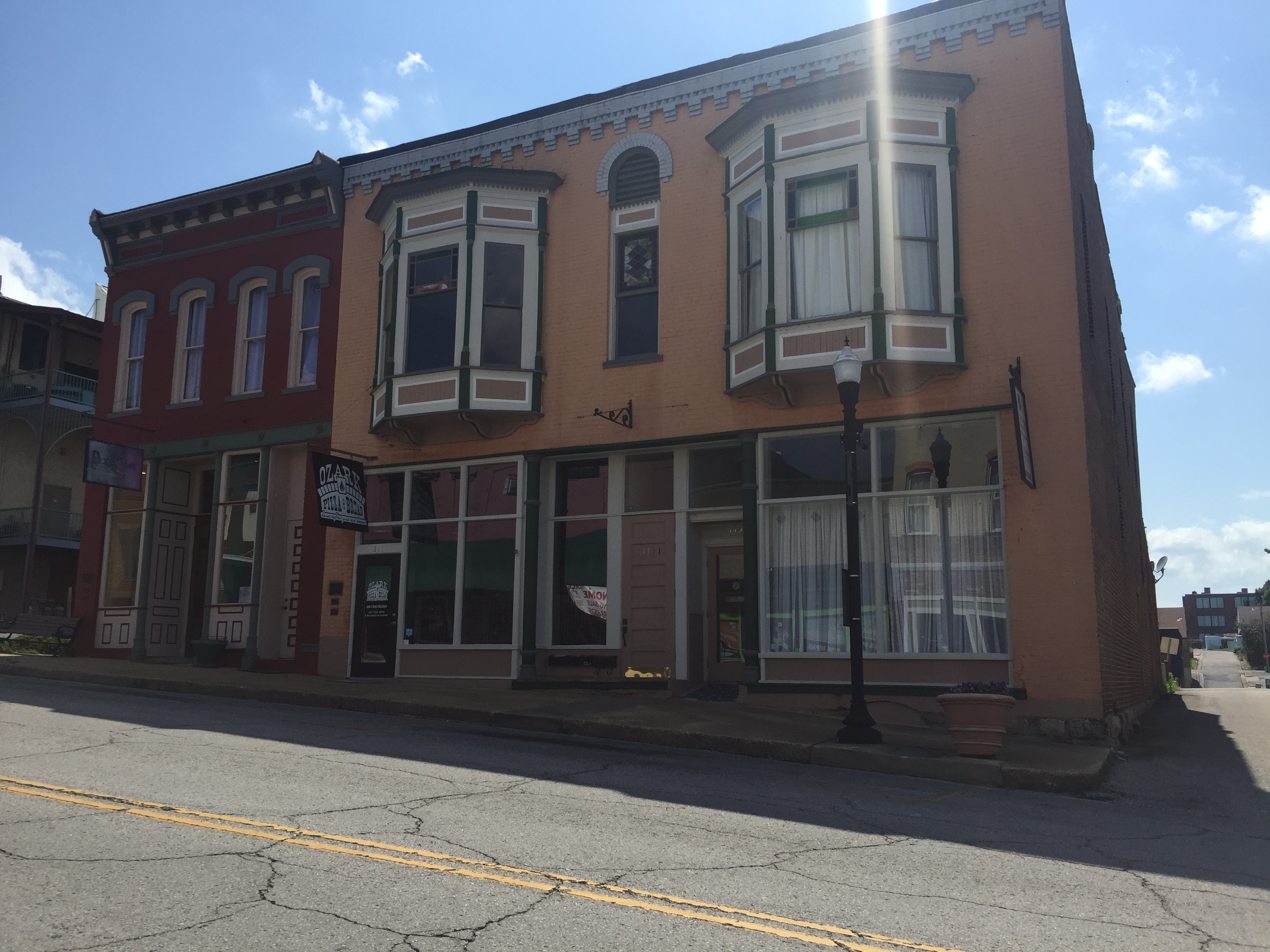
- Building in 2022

- Location within Missouri Location within the United States
- Location: 109-113 Washington Ave., West Plains, Missouri
- Coordinates: 36°43′44″N 91°51′9″W
- Area: less than one acre
- Built: 1894
- Built by: Smith, W.J.
- Architectural style: Italianate, Two-part commercial
- Part of: Courthouse Square Historic District (West Plains, Missouri) (ID03000651)
- NRHP reference No.: 01000012

Significant dates
- Added to NRHP: January 26, 2001
- Designated CP: July 17, 2003

W. J. and Ed Smith Building, also known as H.P. Authorson Meat Market and Charles Coon Billiard Hall, is a historic commercial building located at West Plains, Howell County, Missouri. It was built in 1894, and is a two-story, three-bay, brick commercial building with Italianate style design elements. There are two first-floor storefronts and second floor living spaces. It has two concrete rear additions; one built about 1923 and the other about 1952. It is located next to the West Plains Bank Building.

It was listed on the National Register of Historic Places in 2001. It is located in the Courthouse Square Historic District.
