= Georgette Koko =

Gabonese politician

Georgette Koko (born 16 March 1953) is a Gabonese politician who served in the government of Gabon as Deputy Prime Minister for the Environment from January 2006 to October 2009. She has been President of the Economic and Social Council since 2016.

== Life and career ==
Koko was born in Makokou, located in the Ogooué-Ivindo Province of Gabon. After studying in Gabon and then in France, Koko began working at the Ministry of the Environment; she was placed in charge of studies at the National Anti-Pollution Center in April 1989 and became Director of the Environment in August 1995. Later, she was adviser to the Director-General of the Environment from 2002 to 2004, then adviser to the Minister of the Environment beginning in 2004.

Koko was appointed to the government as Deputy Prime Minister for the Environment, the Protection of Nature, and Research and Technology on 21 January 2006; in that post, she ranked second in the government, behind only Prime Minister Jean Eyeghé Ndong. Her portfolio was modified on 25 January 2007, when she was appointed as Deputy Prime Minister for the Environment, the Protection of Nature, and Urban Affairs, and again on 29 December 2007, when she was appointed as Deputy Prime Minister for the Environment, the Protection of Nature, and Sustainable Development.

At the 9th Ordinary Congress of the Gabonese Democratic Party (PDG) in September 2008, Koko became one of the party's Vice-Presidents. In the January 2009 Senate election, she was the PDG candidate in the first arrondissement of Makokou and won the seat.

On 8 June 2009, following the death of President Omar Bongo at a Spanish hospital, Koko announced the news to the Gabonese people on television, saying that he had died of a heart attack. She stressed the importance of preserving state institutions and urged the people to show unity and solidarity "on this painful occasion".

After Bongo's son, Ali Bongo Ondimba, won the 30 August 2009 presidential election, Koko was dismissed from the government on 17 October 2009. Koko subsequently served as a Senator, and in April 2012 she was designated as President of the PDG Parliamentary Group in the Senate. Following the December 2014 Senate election, Koko was elected as Second Vice-President of the Senate on 27 February 2015. A year later, on 10 March 2016, she was appointed as President of the Economic and Social Council.
