= KWPM =

- West Plains, Missouri; United States
- Frequency: 1450 kHz
- Branding: 1450 News Radio KWPM

Programming
- Format: News Talk

Ownership
- Owner: Greg Hoskins; (Better Newspapers, Inc.)
- Sister stations: KSPQ, KUKU-FM, KUPH, KKDY

History
- First air date: July 15, 1947
- Call sign meaning: "Keep West Plains Moving"

Technical information
- Licensing authority: FCC
- Class: C
- ERP: 1,000 watts
- Transmitter coordinates: 36°44′28″N 91°50′01″W
- Translator: (105.1 MHz) K286CK (West Plains)

Links
- Public license information: Public file; LMS
- Website: KWPM official website

KWPM (1450 AM, "1450 News Radio KWPM") is a radio station licensed to serve West Plains, Missouri. The station was created in 1947 by Robert Neathery. KWPM signed on for the first time on July 15, 1947. KWPM is now owned by Greg Hoskins, through licensee Better Newspapers, Inc., and airs a news-talk format.

KWPM's signal was repeated by KUKU (1330 kHz) in Willow Springs, Missouri until KUKU went silent in March 2013.
