= West Plains, Missouri =

- City
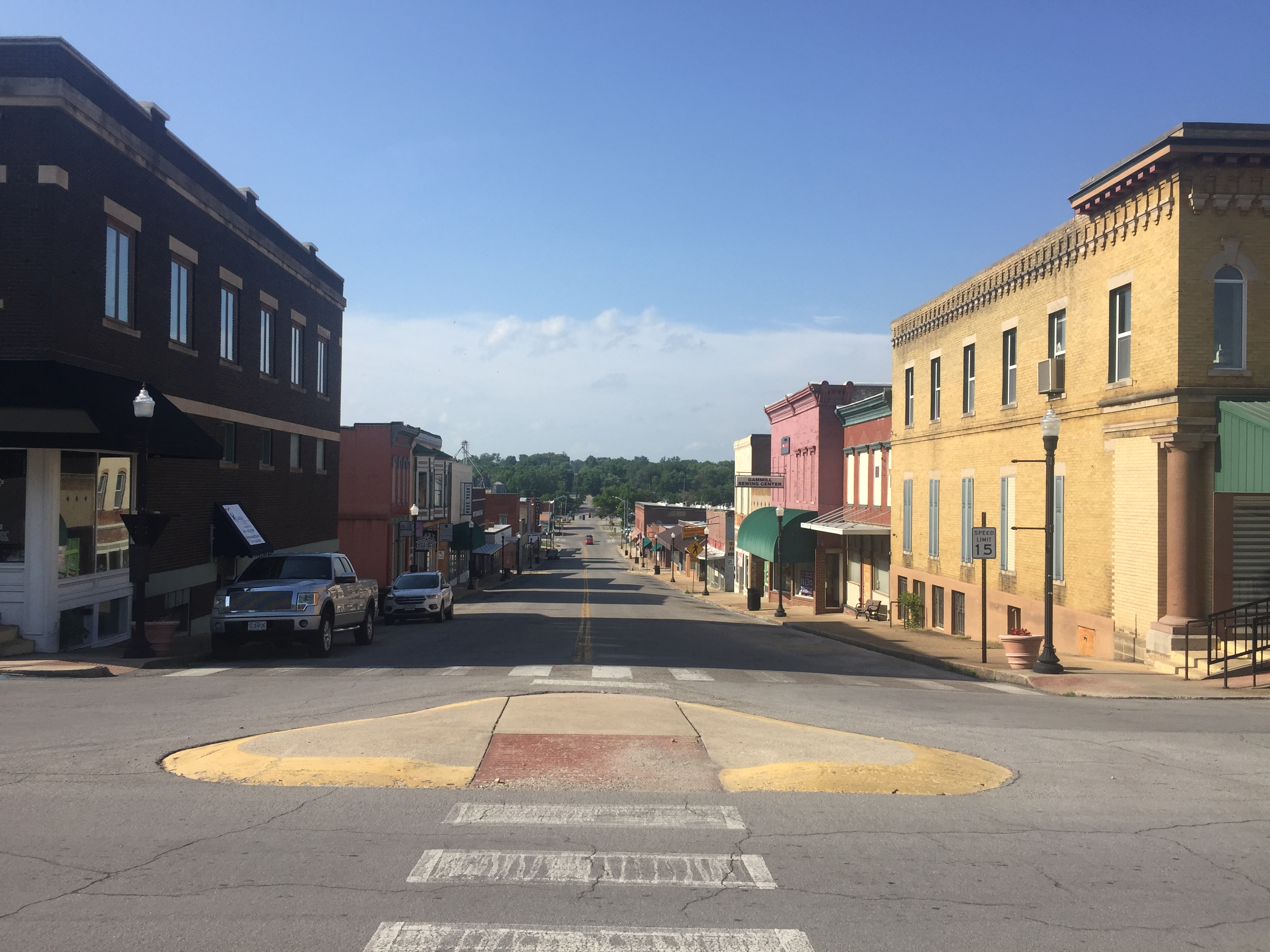
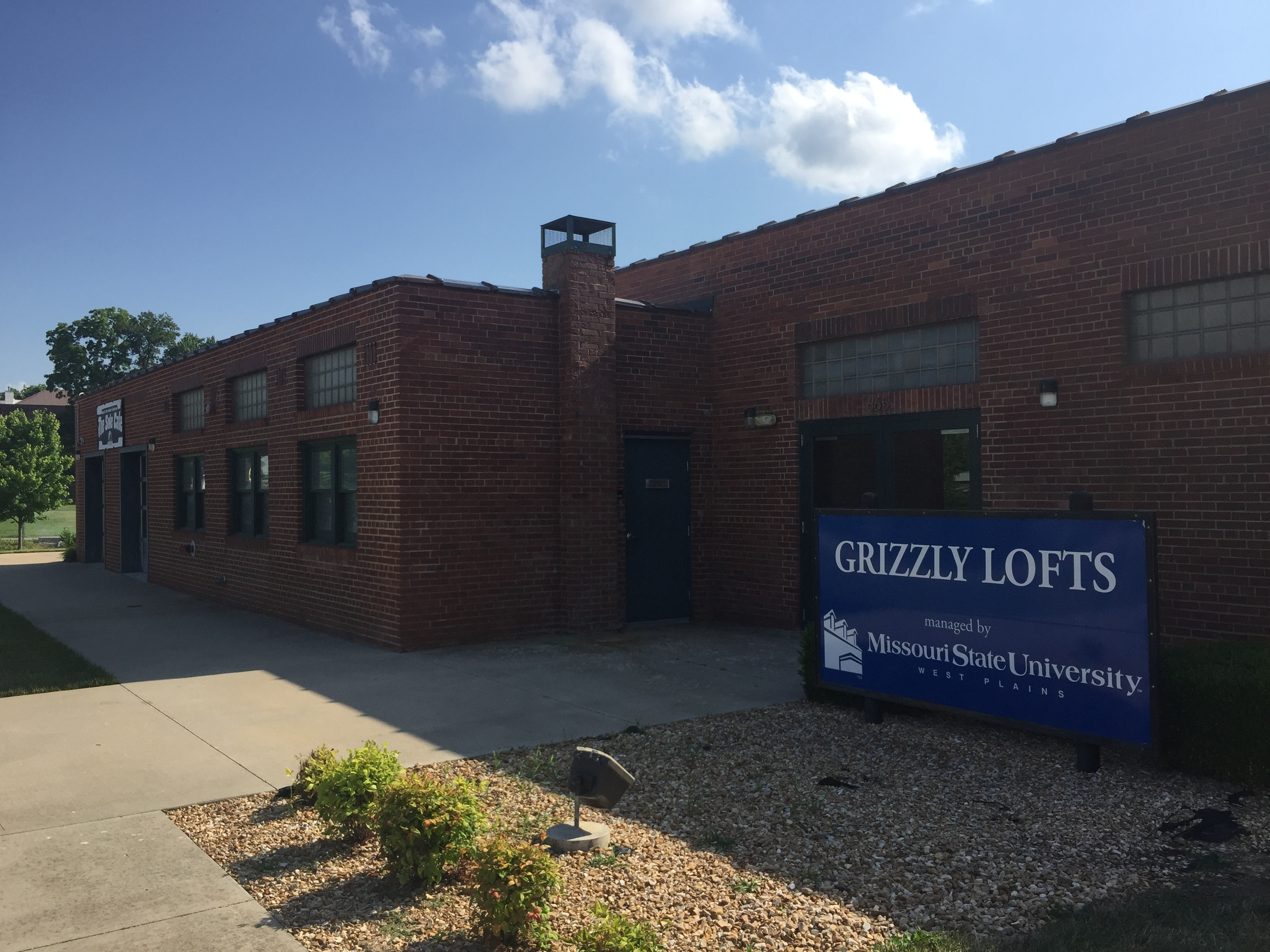
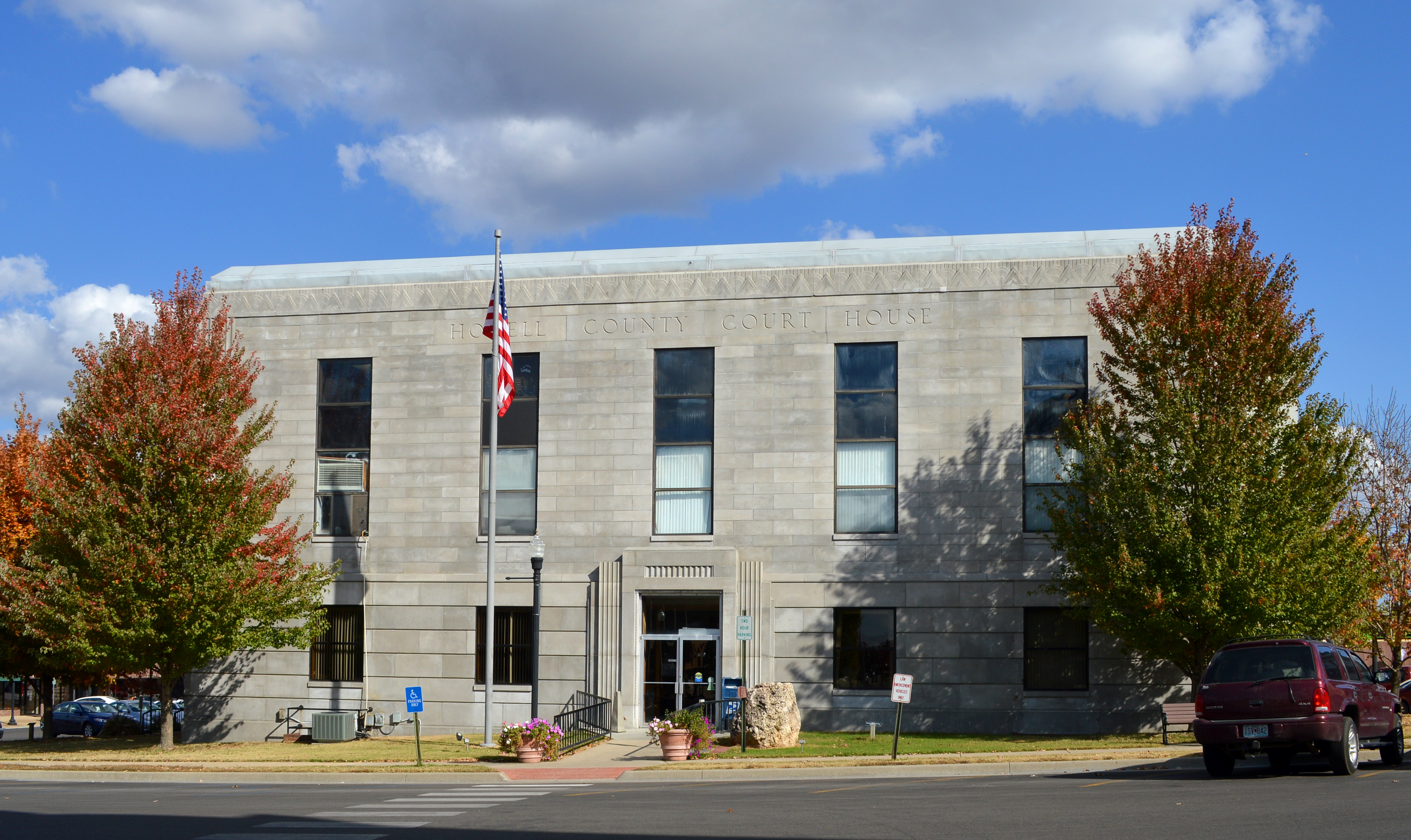
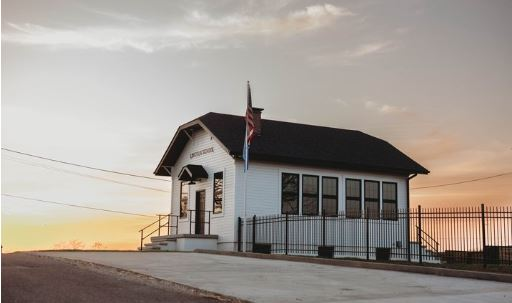
- Downtown West Plains Missouri State University–West Plains Howell County Courthouse Lincoln School

- Flag
- Motto: Make It Happen Here
- Location within Howell County and Missouri

- Location in Missouri Location in the United States
- Coordinates: 36°44′14″N 91°51′54″W
- Country: United States
- State: Missouri
- County: Howell
- First settled: 1838
- Incorporated (city): 1883
- Founder: Josiah Howell
- Named for: Location on a prairie west of the nearest town

Government
  - Type: Mayor–council
  - Mayor: Mike Topliff

Area
  - Total: 13.32 sq mi (34.51 km^{2})
  - Land: 13.31 sq mi (34.46 km^{2})
  - Water: 0.019 sq mi (0.05 km^{2}) 0.15%
  - μSA: 928.33 sq mi (2,404.4 km^{2})
- Elevation: 994 ft (303 m)

Population (2020)
  - Total: 12,184
  - Density: 915.8/sq mi (353.59/km^{2})
- Time zone: UTC−6 (Central Standard Time)
  - Summer (DST): UTC−5 (Central Daylight Time)
- ZIP code: 65775
- Area code: 417
- FIPS code: 29-78928
- GNIS ID: 2397273
- Website: westplains.gov

West Plains is a city in and the county seat of Howell County, Missouri, United States. The population was 12,184 at the 2020 census.

== History ==
The history of West Plains can be traced back to 1832, when settler Josiah Howell (after whom Howell County is named) created the first settlement in the region known as Howell Valley. West Plains was so named because the settlement was on a prairie to the west of the nearest town, Thomasville.

The Courthouse Square Historic District, Elledge Arcade Buildings, International Shoe Company Building, Mount Zion Lodge Masonic Temple, W. J. and Ed Smith Building, West Plains Bank Building, and the Lincoln School are listed on the National Register of Historic Places.

=== The American Civil War ===
The location of West Plains led to nearly constant conflict due to the proximity to what was then the border between the Union and Confederacy. West Plains was largely burned to the ground, and Howell County as a whole was devastated. No major battles occurred in West Plains or Howell County, but much of the devastation came from constant guerrilla warfare.

Confederate Brigadier General James Haggin McBride gave residents an ultimatum to either join the Confederate army or flee the area. An overwhelming majority of Howell County residents chose to leave, and over 90% of the population had fled by the time the war was over. Many, however, also chose to fight for the Confederacy, as McBride promised to protect his soldiers' property and loved ones. Men who spoke out against the Confederacy were arrested, as martial law had been declared by McBride.

South Carolina native, and West Plains resident, William Monks, was a scout for the "North" (Union army) and recounted his tales of the Civil War in his 1907 book "A History of Southern Missouri and Northern Arkansas." In that memoir, Monks recounts many depredations that occurred during the war and how the Confederates referred to those faithful to the Union as "lopeared Dutch" (many Missourians who were "Union men" were German).

=== 20th century ===
In 1903, African Americans were driven out of West Plains under threat of violence.

=== The Great Depression era ===
As with many other locations, the Great Depression hit West Plains in the 1930s. Citizens had little knowledge of what was going on with the national scene, except for what Neathery says in his book, "every place was a boom town, [but] in some places things were going bust as well." The first bank to fail in West Plains was the Farmers Savings Bank in West Plains circa 1926, and the lack of the present-day Federal Deposit Insurance Corporation meant that some people initially lost whatever wealth was deposited.

==== West Plains Dance Hall explosion ====
On April 13, 1928, for reasons still unknown, a violent explosion occurred in downtown West Plains. About 60 people had gathered in the Bond Dance Hall, which was on the second floor of a building on East Main Street. The explosion was reported to be felt for miles, even in Pomona, which is approximately ten miles from West Plains. Windows were shattered throughout the block, and cars were also warped on the street. The explosion also damaged the nearby Howell County Courthouse so badly that it was vacated and left until late 1933, when it was demolished by the Civil Works Administration. Thirty-seven people were killed in the explosion, and 22 people were injured. Twenty of those killed were never positively identified, but buried in a mass grave at Oak Lawn Cemetery in the southeast part of town. They are memorialized by the Rock of Ages monument, erected on October 6, 1929. The explosion has also been remembered in a folk song recorded 30 years later.

The cause of the explosion remains controversial. Numerous causes have been offered, but none have been definitively proven. The most widely accepted theory is that the explosion somehow originated from leaking gasoline in a garage owned by J. W. Wiser, which happened to be on the floor below. Because Wiser was at the garage at the time, some have speculated that the blast was intentionally caused by Wiser as a suicide attempt, which his wife reportedly refused to acknowledge. In addition, the late West Plains native Robert Neathery explained in his 1994 book, West Plains As I Knew It, that a truck containing dynamite parked in the garage may have been the cause, indirectly part of a crime in which someone shot Wiser and set a fire to cover up the crime, and the dynamite exploded.

The event is fictionalized in the short novel The Maid's Version by Daniel Woodrell, which is about a similar dance hall explosion in the fictional town of West Table.

=== West Plains Badgers ===
In 1936, West Plains gained its own Minor League Baseball team named the West Plains Badgers within the Northeast Arkansas League. They would move the same year to Caruthersville, Missouri where they became the Caruthersville Pilots. In 1940, they would move to Batesville, Arkansas, where they were known as the Batesville Pilots. The team disbanded in 1941.

=== After the Depression ===
In 1954, following Brown v. Board of Education, city leaders voted unanimously to desegregate the school system. The Lincoln School, a one-room school for African-Americans closed down, and its students were transferred elsewhere. The building itself was given to the city. A local couple, Crockett and Tonya Oaks III, bought the building in 2023 and restored it, partnering with the Missouri Historical Society and Missouri History Museum and commissioning art from local artist Heather Legler and Nigerian muralist Dr. Bolaji Ogunwo.

On the evening of April 2, 1982, a long-track F4 tornado struck the West Plains area, beginning in Ozark County and ending near what was the airport at the time. Many homes and businesses were significantly damaged or leveled by the tornado, which killed three and injured at least 28 as it hit the West Plains Country Club and nearby homes, as well as businesses located on U.S. Route 63.

The downtown area of West Plains, namely Court Square, was listed on the National Register of Historic Places on July 17, 2003. The Downtown Revitalization Economic Assistance for Missouri (DREAM) Act also opened up funding for renovations and improvements for certain downtown buildings.

== Geography ==
West Plains is located at 36°44′14″N 91°51′54″W (36.737355, −91.864991). According to the United States Census Bureau, the city has a total area of 13.33 square miles (34.52 km^{2}), of which 13.31 square miles (34.47 km^{2}) is land and 0.02 square miles (0.05 km^{2}) is water.

=== Climate ===
West Plains is characterized by four distinct seasons and is located near the northern border of a humid subtropical climate (Cfa), as defined by the Köppen climate classification system; as such, West Plains tends to be exceptionally humid in the late summer. On average, there are 44.6 days with highs over 90 °F (32 °C), 3.3 with highs over 100 °F (38 °C), 11.8 days where the temperature does not rise above freezing, and 1.3 with lows below 0 °F (−18 °C).

Climate data for West Plains, Missouri (1991–2020 normals, extremes 1948–present)
Month	Jan	Feb	Mar	Apr	May	Jun	Jul	Aug	Sep	Oct	Nov	Dec	Year
Record high °F (°C)	77 (25)	89 (32)	91 (33)	91 (33)	96 (36)	106 (41)	107 (42)	108 (42)	104 (40)	94 (34)	85 (29)	80 (27)	108 (42)
Mean maximum °F (°C)	66.4 (19.1)	71.7 (22.1)	78.8 (26.0)	84.2 (29.0)	87.8 (31.0)	93.4 (34.1)	97.8 (36.6)	98.7 (37.1)	92.7 (33.7)	84.2 (29.0)	74.5 (23.6)	66.2 (19.0)	100.3 (37.9)
Mean daily maximum °F (°C)	43.8 (6.6)	49.3 (9.6)	58.2 (14.6)	68.5 (20.3)	75.5 (24.2)	83.9 (28.8)	89.0 (31.7)	87.4 (30.8)	80.2 (26.8)	69.0 (20.6)	56.6 (13.7)	46.1 (7.8)	67.3 (19.6)
Daily mean °F (°C)	33.1 (0.6)	37.5 (3.1)	45.6 (7.6)	55.7 (13.2)	64.0 (17.8)	72.6 (22.6)	77.3 (25.2)	75.5 (24.2)	68.1 (20.1)	56.4 (13.6)	45.3 (7.4)	36.0 (2.2)	55.6 (13.1)
Mean daily minimum °F (°C)	22.3 (−5.4)	25.8 (−3.4)	32.9 (0.5)	43.0 (6.1)	52.5 (11.4)	61.3 (16.3)	65.6 (18.7)	63.5 (17.5)	56.0 (13.3)	43.8 (6.6)	33.9 (1.1)	25.8 (−3.4)	43.9 (6.6)
Mean minimum °F (°C)	4.5 (−15.3)	7.7 (−13.5)	16.0 (−8.9)	27.0 (−2.8)	38.3 (3.5)	50.2 (10.1)	57.0 (13.9)	54.8 (12.7)	41.3 (5.2)	28.4 (−2.0)	18.1 (−7.7)	9.6 (−12.4)	0.6 (−17.4)
Record low °F (°C)	−18 (−28)	−21 (−29)	−3 (−19)	18 (−8)	27 (−3)	39 (4)	46 (8)	40 (4)	31 (−1)	19 (−7)	5 (−15)	−13 (−25)	−21 (−29)
Average precipitation inches (mm)	3.25 (83)	2.95 (75)	4.77 (121)	5.68 (144)	5.62 (143)	3.52 (89)	3.70 (94)	4.07 (103)	4.03 (102)	3.84 (98)	4.47 (114)	3.46 (88)	49.36 (1,254)
Average snowfall inches (cm)	2.3 (5.8)	2.9 (7.4)	2.4 (6.1)	0.0 (0.0)	0.0 (0.0)	0.0 (0.0)	0.0 (0.0)	0.0 (0.0)	0.0 (0.0)	0.1 (0.25)	0.0 (0.0)	1.0 (2.5)	8.7 (22)
Average precipitation days (≥ 0.01 in)	7.8	7.5	9.9	9.3	11.4	8.1	8.3	8.3	7.3	8.3	8.5	8.2	102.9
Average snowy days (≥ 0.1 in)	0.9	0.7	0.5	0.0	0.0	0.0	0.0	0.0	0.0	0.0	0.1	0.3	2.5
Source: NOAA

== Demographics ==
Historical population
Census	Pop.	Note	%±
1870	130		—
1880	351		170.0%
1890	2,091		495.7%
1900	2,902		38.8%
1910	2,914		0.4%
1920	3,178		9.1%
1930	3,335		4.9%
1940	4,026		20.7%
1950	4,918		22.2%
1960	5,836		18.7%
1970	6,893		18.1%
1980	7,741		12.3%
1990	9,522		23.0%
2000	10,866		14.1%
2010	11,986		10.3%
2020	12,184		1.7%
U.S. Decennial Census

The West Plains Micropolitan Statistical Area consists of Howell County.

=== 2020 census ===
As of the 2020 census, West Plains had a population of 12,184. The median age was 38.3 years. 23.7% of residents were under the age of 18 and 21.0% of residents were 65 years of age or older. For every 100 females there were 88.3 males, and for every 100 females age 18 and over there were 83.4 males age 18 and over. The census counted 2,577 families.

96.3% of residents lived in urban areas, while 3.7% lived in rural areas.

There were 5,146 households in West Plains, of which 28.5% had children under the age of 18 living in them. Of all households, 36.3% were married-couple households, 19.9% were households with a male householder and no spouse or partner present, and 35.8% were households with a female householder and no spouse or partner present. About 37.3% of all households were made up of individuals and 17.0% had someone living alone who was 65 years of age or older.

There were 5,717 housing units, of which 10.0% were vacant. The homeowner vacancy rate was 2.6% and the rental vacancy rate was 10.5%.

Racial composition as of the 2020 census
Race	Number	Percent
White	10,958	89.9%
Black or African American	131	1.1%
American Indian and Alaska Native	118	1.0%
Asian	116	1.0%
Native Hawaiian and Other Pacific Islander	7	0.1%
Some other race	129	1.1%
Two or more races	725	6.0%
Hispanic or Latino (of any race)	367	3.0%

=== Income and poverty ===
The 2016–2020 5-year American Community Survey estimates show that the median household income was $37,154 (with a margin of error of +/- $7,901) and the median family income was $43,601 (+/- $6,275). Males had a median income of $32,201 (+/- $2,747) versus $20,800 (+/- $6,027) for females. The median income for those above 16 years old was $26,497 (+/- $4,712). Approximately, 23.9% of families and 32.4% of the population were below the poverty line, including 47.5% of those under the age of 18 and 16.9% of those ages 65 or over.

=== 2010 census ===
As of the census of 2010, there were 11,986 people, 5,001 households, and 3,012 families residing in the city. The population density was 900.5 inhabitants per square mile (347.7/km^{2}). There were 5,509 housing units at an average density of 413.9 per square mile (159.8/km^{2}). The racial makeup of the city was 95.04% White, 0.85% Black or African American, 0.63% Native American, 0.85% Asian, 0.05% Native Hawaiian or Pacific Islander, 0.76% from other races, and 1.83% from two or more races. Hispanic or Latino of any race were 2.21% of the population.

There were 5,001 households, of which 31.4% had children under the age of 18 living with them, 42.0% were married couples living together, 13.8% had a female householder with no husband present, 4.5% had a male householder with no wife present, and 39.8% were non-families. 34.1% of all households were made up of individuals, and 15% had someone living alone who was 65 years of age or older. The average household size was 2.30 and the average family size was 2.93.

The median age in the city was 36.7 years. 24.6% of residents were under the age of 18; 10.4% were between the ages of 18 and 24; 24.1% were from 25 to 44; 22.1% were from 45 to 64; and 18.7% were 65 years of age or older. The gender makeup of the city was 45.8% male and 54.2% female.

=== 2000 census ===
As of the census of 2000, there were 10,866 people, 4,518 households, and 2,909 families residing in the city. The population density was 879.0 inhabitants per square mile (339.4/km^{2}). There were 5,072 housing units at an average density of 410.3 per square mile (158.4/km^{2}). The racial makeup of the city was 95.72% White, 0.73% African American, 0.96% Native American, 0.71% Asian, 0.06% Pacific Islander, 0.52% from other races, and 1.31% from two or more races. Hispanic or Latino of any race were 1.65% of the population.

There were 4,518 households, out of which 31.1% had children under the age of 18 living with them, 48.6% were married couples living together, 12.8% had a female householder with no husband present, and 35.6% were non-families. 32.1% of all households were made up of individuals, and 16.8% had someone living alone who was 65 years of age or older. The average household size was 2.29 and the average family size was 2.87.

In the city, the population was spread out, with 24.8% under the age of 18, 8.7% from 18 to 24, 25.6% from 25 to 44, 19.6% from 45 to 64, and 21.2% who were 65 years of age or older. The median age was 38 years. For every 100 females, there were 83.6 males. For every 100 females age 18 and over, there were 77.0 males.

The median income for a household in the city was $24,122, and the median income for a family was $30,369. Males had a median income of $24,705 versus $17,312 for females. The per capita income for the city was $15,019. About 15.1% of families and 19.0% of the population were below the poverty line, including 27.2% of those under age 18 and 12.5% of those age 65 or over.

== Government ==
The West Plains municipal government is based on the home rule charter system. The city council consists of four council members and the mayor, who presides over each meeting. Council members are elected by the city to four-year terms with no term limits.

The current mayor of West Plains is Michael "Mike" Topliff, who was previously the mayor pro-tem. Topliff took the place of Jack Pahlmann, who retired alongside former City Administrator Tom Stehn in 2021.

Current city council members are Mayor Pro Tem Jessica Nease, Councilmember Greg Collins, Councilmember Johnny Murrell and Councilmember Ron Grennan.

Sam Anselm was appointed in 2021 to serve as the city administrator and runs the day-to-day operations of the city, which consists of over 200 employees.

== Education ==
=== Public schools ===
Public schools are provided by the West Plains R-7 School District, providing education to more than 2,000 students.

- West Plains Elementary School (PreK-4)
- West Plains Middle School (5–8)
- West Plains High School (9–12)
- South Fork Elementary School (PreK-6)

In addition, some parts of the immediate area surrounding West Plains are covered by rural schools. After eighth grade, students from the rural schools merge into West Plains High School.

- Fairview Elementary School (K-8)
- Glenwood Elementary School (K-8)
- Howell Valley Elementary School (K-8)
- Junction Hill Elementary School (K-8)
- Richards Elementary School (K-8)

=== Private education ===
Private education is also provided in the West Plains area, primarily by religious institutions. Private schools in the West Plains area include the following:

- Crossroads Christian Academy
- Ozarks Christian Academy

=== Higher education ===
There is one higher education institution located in West Plains. Missouri State University–West Plains is a community college spread across the center of town. The school has multiple degree programs but is primarily focused on its Associate of Arts degree program. The college has ca.1,800 students enrolled in part-time or full-time studies.

=== Public library ===
West Plains has a lending library, the West Plains Public Library.

== Transportation ==
The West Plains area is served by U.S. Route 63, which runs along the western and southern edges of the city. U.S. 63 is a four-lane expressway from the 60/63 interchange near Cabool to Route ZZ in the extreme southeastern part of West Plains, then becomes a 2+1 road going southeast. Route 63's path through the city is often colloquially referred to as "the bypass", and is officially known as Jan Howard Expressway between Porter Wagoner Boulevard and Bill Virdon Boulevard. There are nine traffic lights along U.S. 63, with the newest one being at 5th street, near the hospital, which was added in 2022. One exit exists on U.S. 63 in the city near McFarland Street, which allows drivers to exit onto Business Route 63.

Business Route 63 consists of Porter Wagoner Boulevard, a majority of Main Street, and Bill Virdon Boulevard before it ends at an intersection with the eastern end of Jan Howard Expressway. There are four traffic lights along Business Route 63.

West Plains is also served by U.S. Route 160, which formerly ran southwest to northeast through the city; it has since been rerouted around the city concurrent with U.S. 63. It enters city limits near the Southern Hills business district, where it is named Preacher Roe Boulevard to its intersection with Main Street. Preacher Roe Boulevard, named after longtime West Plains resident and former baseball player Preacher Roe, has four lanes to its intersection with U.S. 63. The route follows U.S. 63 to Gibson Avenue, where it turns right crossing Porter Wagoner Boulevard and becoming Missouri Avenue, a left onto Concord Road, and a right onto Independence Dr, which becomes Joe Jones Boulevard, after which the route exits city limits and carries traffic on a two-lane route toward Alton.

In addition to U.S. Routes 63 and 160, West Plains is also served by Routes 14 and 17 and Routes K, CC, JJ, PP, ZZ, AB, and BB. Many traffic lights in the city were recently upgraded to have flashing-yellow arrow signals for left-turning intersections.

One railroad, dated to 1882, passes through town on a BNSF Railway line from Springfield, Missouri to Memphis, Tennessee.

=== Transit ===
The West Plains Transit System provides residents with a deviated fixed route transit service. Three buses are operated from 7:45am to 3:45pm Monday through Friday.

=== Airport ===
West Plains is also served by the West Plains Regional Airport, which is located in nearby Pomona, about 10 miles north of the city on U.S. 63.

== Parks ==
- Carmichal Field (often misspelled "Carmichael," and located along Missouri Avenue behind the newly renovated MSU-WP Grizzly Lofts in the former International Shoe Factory, host to Mighty Mites Football)
- Butler Children's Park
- People's Park (site of the City Pool)
- Soccer Fields (host of West Plains Soccer Association)
- Galloway Park
- Gene Jones Park (site of Tuk's Playground, a dog park named in honor of K-9 Officer Tuk, who died in 2019 of degenerative disease

== Media ==
West Plains is served by several media outlets. In addition to receiving most television stations coming from Springfield, one low-power television station emanates from West Plains, as do eight radio stations. The city also has one daily newspaper, the West Plains Daily Quill.

=== Newspaper ===
- West Plains Daily Quill, formerly the West Plains Weekly Quill, founded in 1885.

=== Radio ===
West Plains is served by several radio stations. The Ozark Radio Network, which is owned by Robert Neathery's granddaughter and her husband, covers Dent, Douglas, Howell, Oregon, Ozark, Reynolds, Ripley, Shannon, Texas, and Wright counties as well as adjacent sections of Christian, Taney, and Webster counties in Missouri and Baxter, Fulton, Izard, Marion, Searcy, Sharp, and Stone counties as well as adjacent sections of Boone, Independence, Lawrence, and Randolph counties in Arkansas. The network comprises

- KSPQ-93.9 FM (Q94, Jack FM) broadcasting Classic Rock
- KKDY-102.5 FM (KDY) broadcasting New Country
- KUPH-96.9 FM (The Fox) broadcasting Urban and Adult Contemporary
- KUKU-FM-100.3 FM (Cool Classic County) broadcasting Classic Country
- KWPM-1450 AM/105.1 FM (News Radio) broadcasting News Talk Radio

Also located in West Plains are:

- KSMW-90.3 FM (repeater of KSMU) broadcasting NPR
- KHOM-100.9 FM (The Train) broadcasting 60s, 70s, and 80s Oldies
- KBMV-107.1 FM (K-LOVE) broadcasting Contemporary Christian

KHOM and KBMV are stations in the E-Communications network, based in Thayer, Missouri.

=== Television ===
- K36NN-D, broadcasting 24-hour Christian programming

== Notable people ==
- Egbert Brown (1816–1902), Union general in the Civil War, died in West Plains.
- Jan Howard birth name Lula Grace Johnson (1929–2020), country and western singer.
- Gilbert Ray (Speck) Rhodes (1915–2000), country music comedian and entertainer.
- Elwin Charles (Preacher) Roe (1916–2008), major league baseball left-handed pitcher for the St. Louis Cardinals, Pittsburgh Pirates and Brooklyn Dodgers.
- Stephen Thompson (1894–1977), credited with the first aerial victory by the U.S. military.
- Dick Van Dyke (b. 1925), actor, born in West Plains, raised in Danville, Illinois.
- Bill Virdon (1931–2021), Major League Baseball player and manager, graduated from West Plains High School.
- Porter Wagoner (1927–2007), country and western singer.
- Wilmer Waters (1914–1995), Wisconsin State Assemblyman.
- Daniel Woodrell (b. 1953), crime fiction novelist best known for Woe to Live On and Winter's Bone.
- Ha Ha Tonka, an indie rock band founded in Springfield, Missouri, but three members were raised in West Plains.

== See also ==
- National Audio Theatre Festival, an annual conference and group of performances frequently held in West Plains, and including local participants. In past years, an audio play was written around the events in the city.
