= Koko River (Rutsiro District) =

River in Rwanda

Location
- Country: Rwanda
- District: Rutsiro District

Physical characteristics
- Mouth
  - coordinates: 1.991504°S 29.354997°E

Basin features
- River system: Lake Kivu
- Tributaries
  - left: Rwishwa River

The Koko River is a river in the Rutsiro District of western Rwanda that flows into Lake Kivu.

It is one of the main rivers draining the western Rwandan mountains into Lake Kivu, the other being the Sebeya River. During the colonial era the river defined the boundary between the Kibuye and Gisenyi Prefectures. The settlements of Gasiza and Murunda are close to the Koko's convergence with the Rwishwa River.
