= International Shoe Company Building (West Plains, Missouri) =

- U.S. National Register of Historic Places
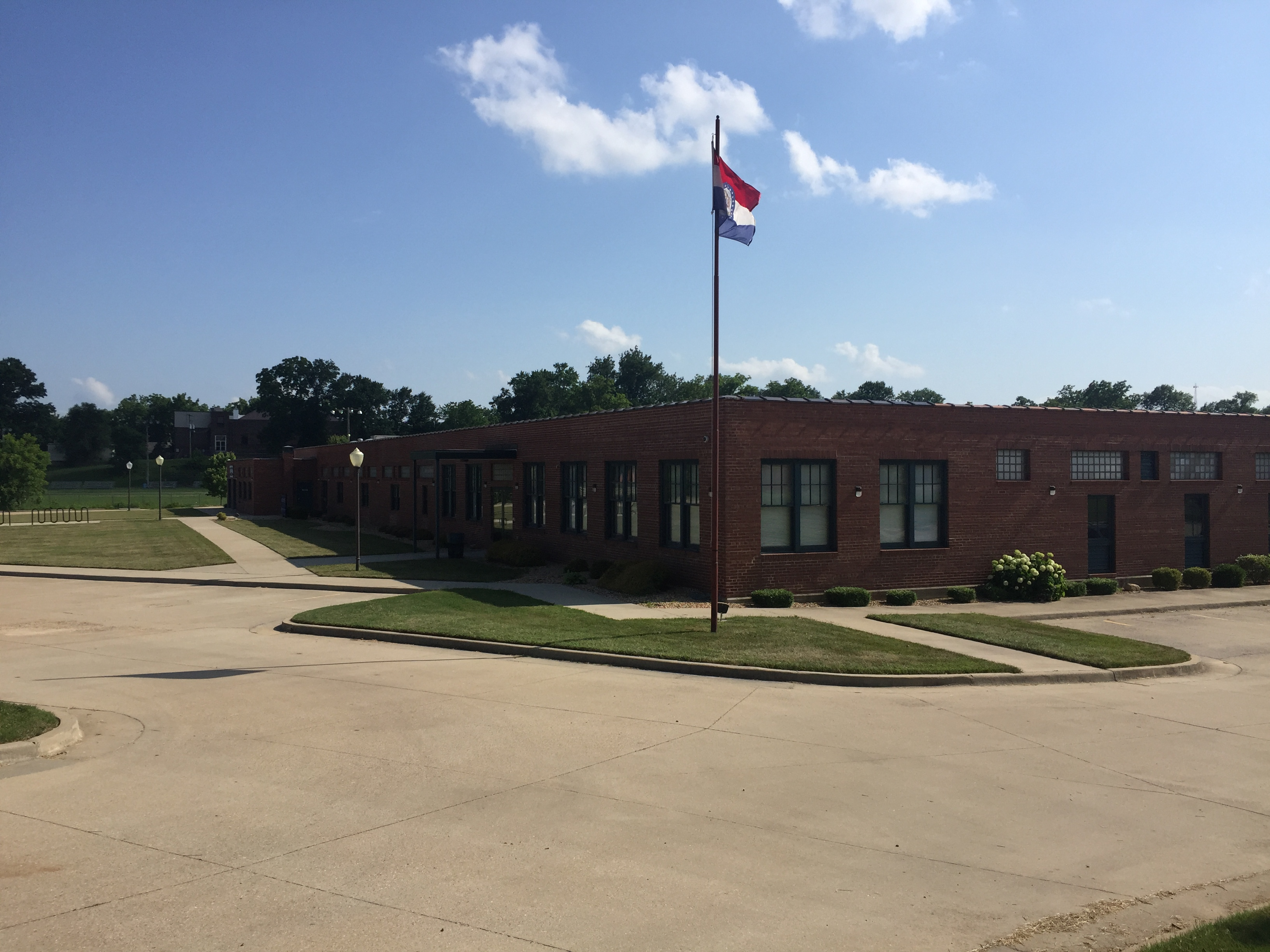

- Location within Missouri Location within the United States
- Location: 665 Missouri Avenue, West Plains, Missouri
- Coordinates: 36°44′05″N 91°51′31″W
- Area: 3 acres (1.2 ha)
- Built: 1946, 1952
- Built by: Burke, Arthur; Paris, Charles
- Architect: Reinhardt, Herbert H.
- NRHP reference No.: 11000783
- Added to NRHP: November 8, 2011

The International Shoe Company Building is a historic factory building located at 665 Missouri Avenue in West Plains, Missouri. The one-story building consists of two wings, one constructed in 1946 and another in 1952. The 1946 wing contains 41,400 square feet; and the 1952 wing contains 20,736 square feet. The building was erected as a factory for the International Shoe Company. The factory closed in 1993.

It was listed on the National Register of Historic Places in 2011.
