= KUKU-FM =

- Willow Springs, Missouri; United States
- Broadcast area: West Plains, Missouri; Houston, Missouri; Mountain Grove, Missouri
- Frequency: 100.3 MHz
- Branding: Cool Classic Country 100.3

Programming
- Format: Classic country
- Affiliations: Fox News Radio

Ownership
- Owner: Greg Hoskins; (Better Newspapers, Inc.)
- Sister stations: KKDY, KSPQ, KUPH, KWPM

Technical information
- Licensing authority: FCC
- Facility ID: 50349
- Class: C2
- ERP: 50,000 watts
- HAAT: 150 meters (490 ft)
- Transmitter coordinates: 37°03′47″N 92°01′42″W

Links
- Public license information: Public file; LMS
- Website: kukuradio.com

KUKU-FM is a radio station airing a classic country format licensed to Willow Springs, Missouri, broadcasting on 100.3 FM. The station is owned by Linda Hoskins, through licensee Better Newspapers, Inc. The station hosts a swap line weekly.

KUKU features top of the hour news programming from Fox News Radio.
