= Tornadoes of 1961 =

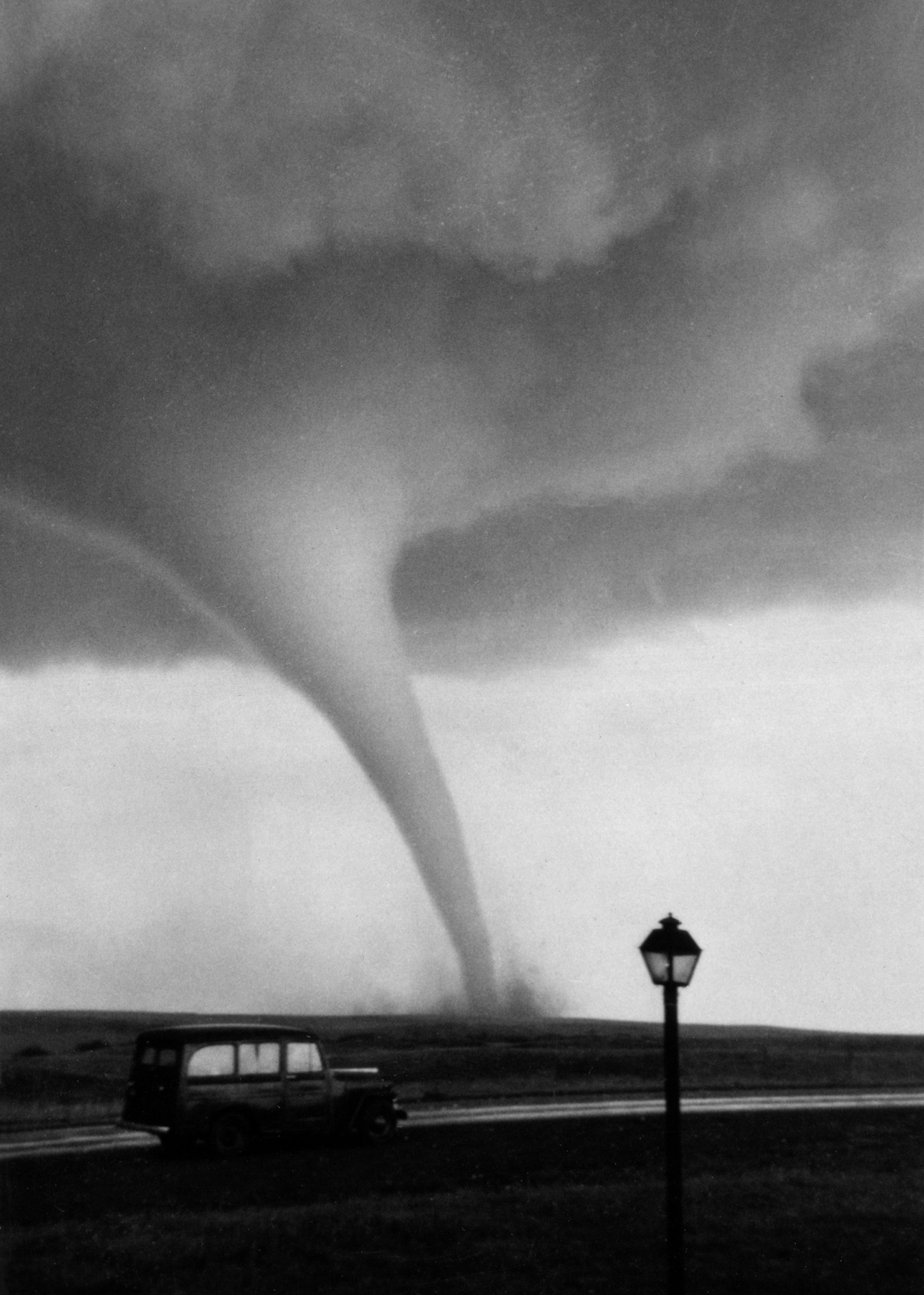
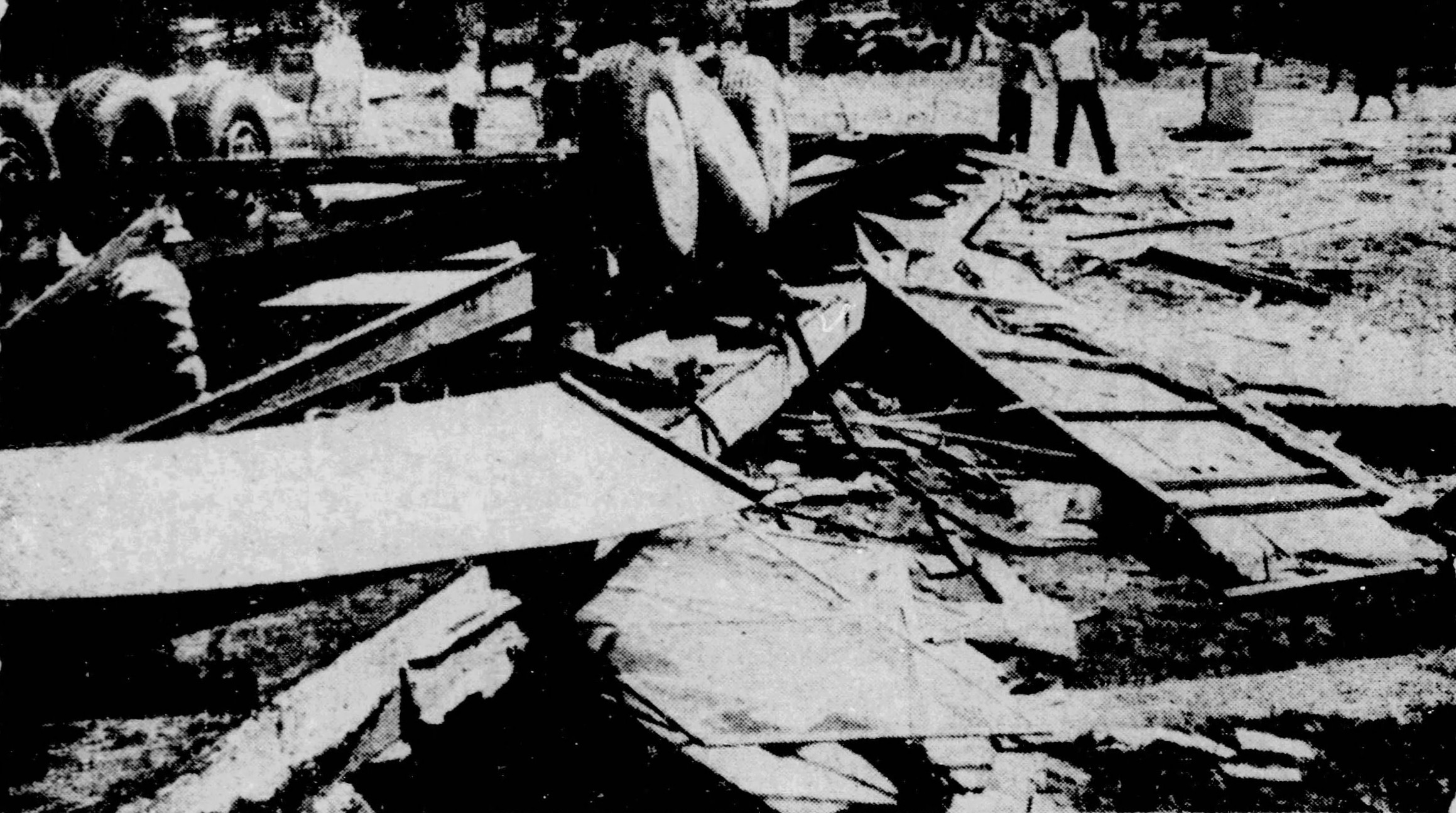
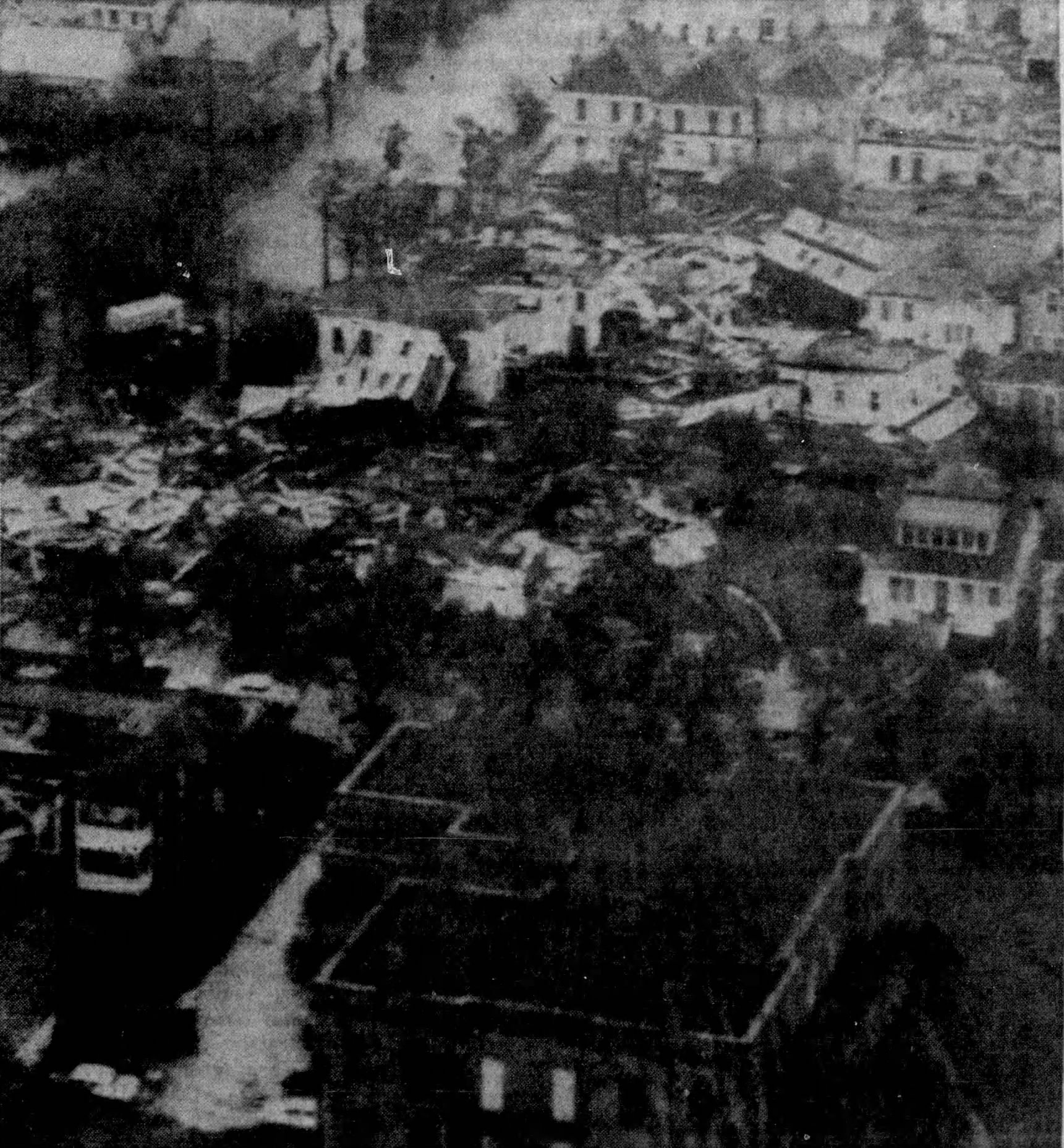
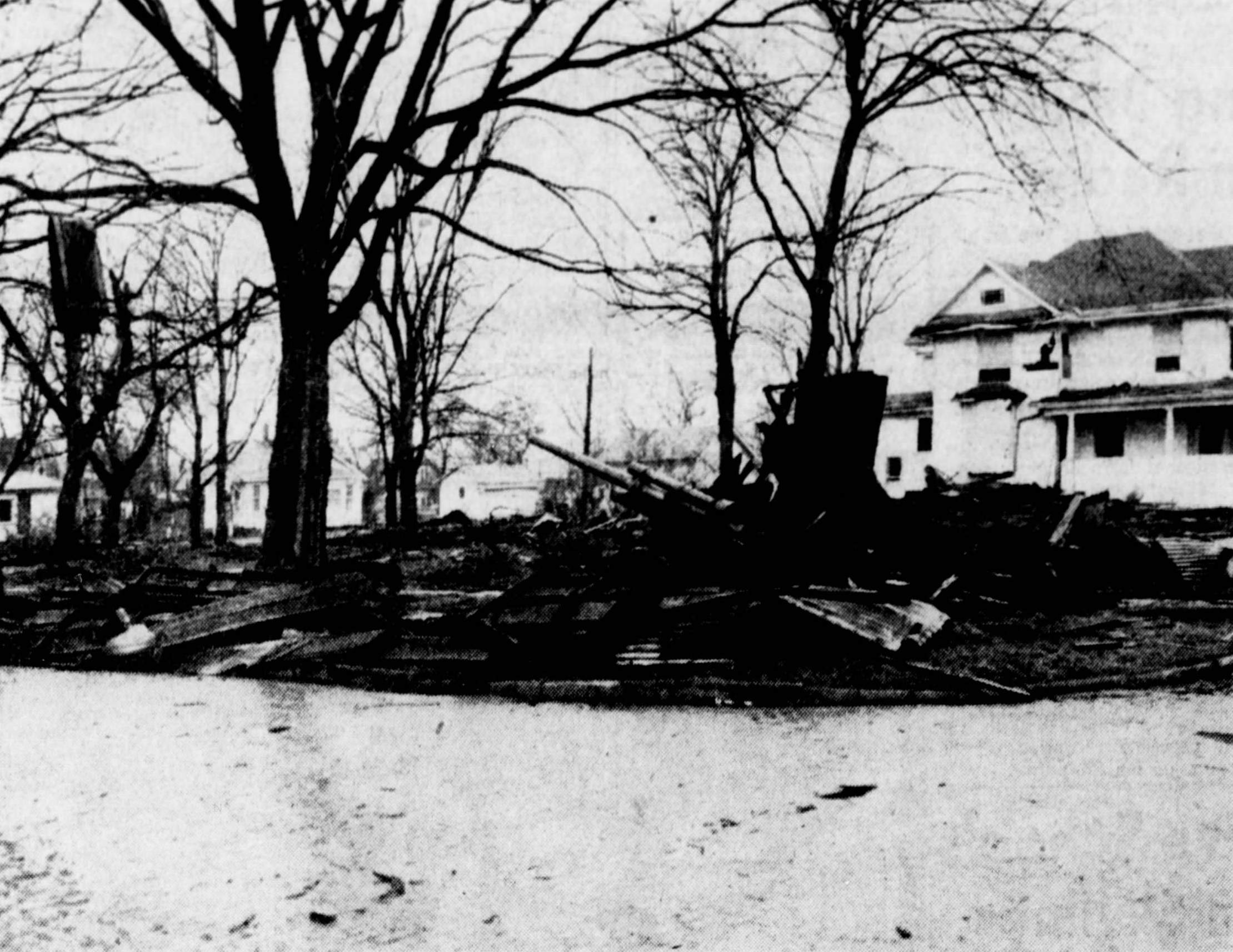
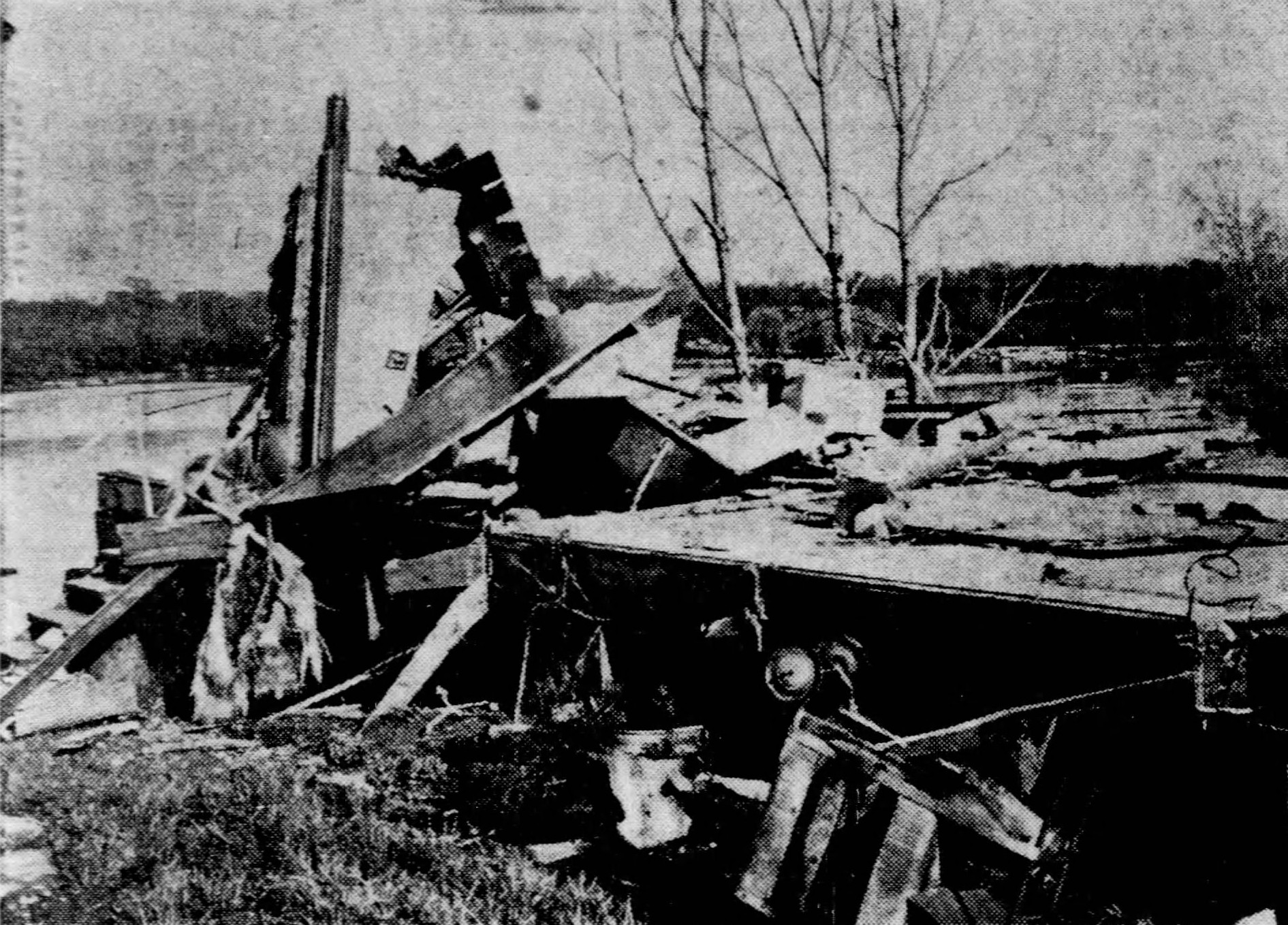
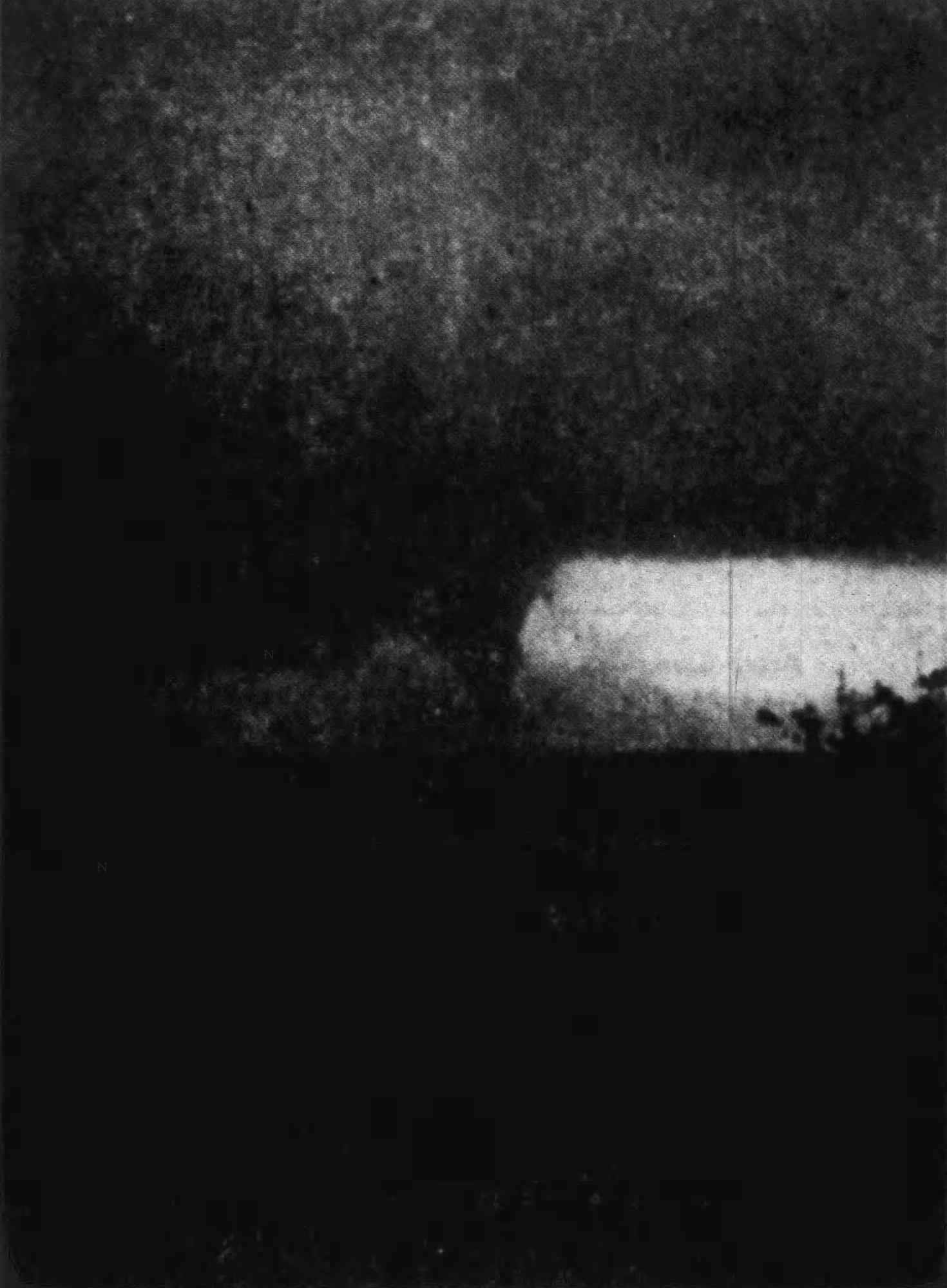
- Clockwise from top: A highly visible F2 tornado near Cheyenne, Oklahoma on May 4; An aerial view of downtown Galveston, Texas after an F4 tornado on September 12; A home along the shoreline of Weatherby Lake, Missouri after an F4 tornado on May 7; A violent F4+ tornado west of Ord, Nebraska on May 30; Damage in Gibson City, Illinois after an F1 tornado on March 4; The remains of a mobile home in southern Glendive, Montana after an F4 tornado on June 29.
- Timespan: 1961
Maximum rated tornado
F4 tornado
- List
  – Waterloo-Boston, Indiana
  on April 25
  – Reichert, Oklahoma
  on May 5
  – Wolcott, Kansas-Weatherby Lake, Missouri
  on May 7
  – Sargent, Nebraska
  on May 30
  – Glendive, Montana
  on June 29
  – Butler County, Iowa
  on September 1
  – Galveston, Texas
  on September 12
- Tornadoes in U.S.: 697
- Damage (U.S.): Unknown
- Fatalities (U.S.): 52
- Fatalities (worldwide): >52

This page documents the tornadoes and tornado outbreaks of 1961, primarily in the United States. Most tornadoes form in the U.S., although some events may take place internationally. Tornado statistics for older years like this often appear significantly lower than modern years due to fewer reports or confirmed tornadoes.

== Events ==
Fatal United States tornadoes in 1961
- Approximate touchdown location of killer tornadoes in 1961
Summary of tornadoes
- March 4 – Illinois (1 death)
- March 6 – Indiana (1 death)
- March 12 – Arkansas (1 death)
- March 12 – Missouri (1 death)
- March 27 – Texas (2 deaths)
- March 31 – Georgia (1 death)
- April 12 – South Carolina (1 death)
- April 23 – Iowa (1 death)
- April 25 – Ohio (2 deaths)
- May 4 – Oklahoma (1 death)
- May 5 – Oklahoma (16 deaths)
- May 5 – Arkansas (1 death)
- May 6 – Arkansas (2 deaths)
- May 7 – Arkansas (3 deaths)
- June 9 – Kentucky (1 death)
- June 21 – South Dakota (1 death)
- September 10 – Louisiana (1 death)
- September 12 – Texas (8 deaths)
- September 12 – Louisiana (5 deaths)
- September 24 – Illinois (1 death)
- November 22 – Texas (1 death)
Total fatalities: 52

=== United States yearly total ===
Confirmed tornadoes by Fujita rating
FU	F0	F1	F2	F3	F4	F5	Total
0	154	241	229	66	7	0	697

== January ==
There was 1 tornado confirmed in the US in January.

== February ==
There were 31 tornadoes confirmed in the US in February.

=== February 17–18 ===
FU	F0	F1	F2	F3	F4	F5
0	1	1	3	2	0	0

Seven tornadoes struck Kansas, Oklahoma, Ohio, including some strong tornadoes that struck the Oklahoma City metro. On February 17, a large F3 tornado tore through Spencer, Jones, Northeastern Oklahoma City, and Luther, Oklahoma, injuring seven. Another large, long-tracked F3 tornado then ripped through Stratford, northwestern Oil Center, southeastern Konawa, Wewoka, northwestern Weleetka, and northwestern Henryetta, injuring 11 on its 73 mi (117 km) path. This was followed by an F2 tornado that moved over the Shawnee Reservoir, injuring one. In Kansas, a large, .5 mi (0.80 km) wide F2 tornado caused considerable damage in Crestline and Lawton. The outbreak ended the next day after an isolated, but large .25 mi (0.40 km) wide tornado blew through Tiffin, Ohio. In all, a total of 18 people were injured.

=== February 20–22 ===
FU	F0	F1	F2	F3	F4	F5
0	0	5	4	0	0	0

A small outbreak of nine tornadoes hit the Southeast. On February 20, the first tornado of the outbreak struck Bassfield, Mississippi at F2 strength, injuring eight. Another F2 tornado then hit northern Lucas, Sanatorium, and eastern Zion Hill, injuring four. That night, a destructive F1 tornado injured four in Providence, Alabama. Early the next morning, a short-lived, but strong F2 tornado ripped through Angie, Louisiana, injuring nine. The final strong tornado of the outbreak occurred during the early morning hours of February 22, when a very destructive F2 tornado plowed through Alberta Heights and Woodmont, Alabama on the east side of Tuscaloosa. Overall, the tornadoes injured 23.

=== February 24−25 ===
FU	F0	F1	F2	F3	F4	F5
0	1	6	7	0	0	0

Another destructive outbreak of 14 tornadoes hit the Southeast. On February 24, a strong F2 tornado moved through Hurtsboro, Hatchechubbee, Seale and Flournoys, Alabama, obliterating homes, blowing down trees, and injuring four. A damaging F1 tornado moved through Jackson, South Carolina, injuring five. Another F1 tornado caused heavy damage in New Ellenton, South Carolina, two people were injured. The final tornado occurred the next day as an F2 tornado heavily damaged Oak Hill, West Virginia. In the end, the outbreak injured 11.

== March ==
There were 124 tornadoes confirmed in the US in March.

=== March 4–8 ===
FU	F0	F1	F2	F3	F4	F5
0	3	21	14	5	0	0

A destructive outbreak sequence of 44 tornadoes struck the Great Plains, Midwest, Mississippi Valley, and Southeast. It started on March 4 when a long-tracked F1 tornado that struck Arrowsmith, Gibson City, southern Loda, and Southern Wellington, Illinois, injuring one on its 51.1 mi (82.2 km) path. An F2 tornado moved through the South Side of Chicago, causing an estimated $7 million (1961 USD, $75,418,000 adjusted) of damage. The next day, an F2 tornado ripped directly through Pauls Valley, Oklahoma, injuring one.

The early-morning of March 6 proved to be very active and destructive, starting with multiple intense, long-tracked tornadoes in Illinois. A long-tracked F1 tornado moved through Jerseyville, Fidelity, Sunrise Hills, southern Witt, northern Herrick, southern Sigel, southern Roslyn, and Dees, injuring one on its 117.9 mi (189.7 km) path. A second long-tracked tornado then touched down northwest of McBride, Missouri and became an F2 tornado as it crossed the Mississippi River into Illinois, striking Chester, Wine Hill, southern Willisville, Denmark, northern St. Johns, southern Sunfield, Sesser, southern Ina, southern Dahlgren, Belle Prairie City, Aden, southern Browns and southwestern Bellmont on its 112.1 mi (180.4 km) path. Another F2 tornado then hit southern Raleigh and Eldorado, injuring two. The first F3 tornado of the outbreak then touched down southeast of Effingham and moved southeast through the south sides of Dieterich and Wheeler, as well as southwestern Newton, injuring three. Later, a long-tracked F2 tornado moved through Tuscola, West Ridge, Villa Grove, Fairland, Longview, southern Allerton, Sidell, and southern Indianola, injuring two.

Activity then shifted into Indiana. A brief but strong F2 tornado injured two in Thorntown. A fatal F3 tornado then killed one and injured three in Kokomo. Later, an F2 tornado injured three in Austin.

March 7–8 featured more destructive tornado activity. On March 7, a large F1 tornado moved through Bolivar County, Mississippi, including the town of Alligator, injuring 10. Later, an F3 tornado passed through Bluff and Kansas, Alabama, injuring one. Another F3 tornado then tore through northern Fairview, Hulaco, and Union Grove, Alabama, injuring eight. The final strong tornado of the outbreak then occurred early the next morning when a large, 600 yards (550 m) F2 tornado passed through Burning Bush, southern Boynton, and Ringgold, Georgia.

Overall, the outbreak sequence killed two and injured 152.

=== March 12–13 ===
FU	F0	F1	F2	F3	F4	F5
0	1	9	12	3	0	0

Another outbreak of 25 tornadoes hit the Midwest as well as the Mississippi and Tennessee Valleys. The first major tornado of the outbreak caused 14 injuries while doing F2 damage in Carroll County, Arkansas on March 12. Later, an even more disastrous F2 tornado passed by eastern Altus, southern Hunt, and Harmony, killing one and injuring 16. An F3 tornado then hit eastern Wrightsville and Chenault Island.

Tornado activity then ramped up with six tornadoes touching down at the same time with three of them causing casualties. A destructive F2 tornado moved through Boone County, injuring four. Meanwhile, an F1 tornado injured four in Shell Knob, Missouri. The worst of the bunch was a large, long-tracked, 417-yard (381 m) F2 tornado that passed through Gold Creek, southern Beryl, Vilonia, and northwestern El Paso in Arkansas, injuring 12.

Destructive tornado activity then continued into the nighttime hours. An F2 tornado hit Tipton Ford, Missouri, injuring six. Later, a fatal F2 tornado struck northeastern Elijah, Pottersville, and northwestern West Plains, killing one and injuring 11. At the same time, a massive, 833 yd (762 m) wide F2 tornado injured when it passed the southeast sides of Witt Springs and Marshall, Arkansas. Later, an F1 tornado caused considerable damage in southern Springfield, Missouri, injuring one. An F3 tornado injured 12 in rural Woodruff County, Arkansas.

The outbreak ended the next day after an isolated, but intense F3 tornado heavily damaged Morrison, Tennessee. Overall, the destructive outbreak killed two and injuring 84.

=== March 26–31 ===
FU	F0	F1	F2	F3	F4	F5
0	9	10	18	10	0	0

An outbreak sequence produced 47 tornadoes across the Midwest and Southeast. It started with an F2 tornado causing considerable damage in Canadian County, Oklahoma on March 26. Another F2 tornado then hit Crockett, Texas, injuring one. Later, a .25 mi (0.40 km) wide F2 tornado caused major damage and an injury in rural Greenwood County, Kansas. A destructive F3 tornado hit the southwest side of the Fort Worth suburb of Burleson, Texas. At the same time, an F2 tornado hit northwestern Burleson, injuring one.

Tornado activity became more severe heading into the evening and nighttime hours. An F3 tornado injured two in rural Titus County, Texas. A long-tracked F2 tornado tore through Bartlesville and Dewey, Oklahoma, injuring 26 on its 49.6 mi (79.8 km) path. Another F3 tornado then hit Lake Eufaula and Checotah, Oklahoma, injuring one. An F2 tornado then injured one in southern Como, Texas. Another person was then injured by an F3 tornado that passed through rural Franklin and Titus counties in Texas. This was followed by another F3 tornado struck in Italy and northwestern Avalon, Texas, injuring four. Another F3 tornado hit Webb City, Oklahoma before yet another F3 tornado injured nine when it briefly touched down in rural Titus County, Texas. An F2 tornado also injured six in Stuttgart, Arkansas. In all, March 26 produced 27 tornadoes.

Tornado activity over the next four days was limited, but did include multiple strong tornadoes, including the first deadly one of the outbreak. The fatal F3 tornado tore through rural Nacogdoches County, Texas on March 27, killing two and injuring four. The next day, an F2 tornado caused considerable damage in rural Wood County, Texas. March 29 saw an F2 tornado hit northern Horntown, Oklahoma, while March 30 saw a large 800 yd (730 m) wide F2 tornado injure one in rural Avoyelles Parish, Louisiana.

March 31 produced an outbreak of 12 tornadoes across Georgia, Alabama and Florida. A deadly F3 tornado ripped through Unadilla, Georgia, killing one and injuring 14. Another F3 tornado passed through southern Phenix City, Alabama, injuring seven before crossing the Chattahoochee River and causing F1 damage in southern Columbus and Weracoba Heights, Georgia, including Columbus State University. The final tornado to cause casualties was a large, 400 yd (370 m) wide F1 tornado that injured one in Folkston, Georgia.

In all, three people were killed and 80 others were injured in the outbreak sequence.

== April ==
There were 74 tornadoes confirmed in the US in April.

=== April 11–12 ===
FU	F0	F1	F2	F3	F4	F5
0	1	9	4	0	0	0

An outbreak of 14 tornadoes hit the Great Plains and Southeast. It started with an F2 tornado injuring three on the northwest side of the Dallas suburb of Richardson, Texas. Later, another F2 tornado moved through areas east of Emmett. Another F2 tornado caused considerable damage in Reese. The next day, an F2 tornado injured two in the rural Georgia counties of Coffee and Bacon. Later, an F1 tornado injured one in St. Cloud, Florida. The only tornado to cause fatalities was an F1 tornado that struck Hartsville, South Carolina, killing one. In the end, the outbreak killed one and injured six.

=== April 23–30 ===
FU	F0	F1	F2	F3	F4	F5
0	5	7	12	5	1	0

An outbreak sequence of 30 tornadoes impacted the Great Plains, Midwest, Northeast, Mississippi Valley, and Southeast. The first major tornado of the outbreak was a large, long-tracked, 600 yd (550 m) wide F2 tornado that injured two as it passed through Allerton, Martinstown and Streppyville, Thirty, and Moulton, Iowa, on its 68.6 mi (110.4 km) path. This was followed by an even larger, stronger, longer-tracked 800 yd (730 m) wide F3 tornado–which was most likely a tornado family–that passed through southern Marshalltown, Garrison, Vinton, Center Point, Alice, northern Central City, and Monticello, killing one and injuring 12 on its 87.7 mi (141.1 km) path. Later, another long-tracked F3 tornado passed through Lorenzo and Peotone, Illinois as well as Belshaw and Roselawn, Indiana, injuring four on its 51.7 mi (83.2 km) path. The next day, a narrow but long-tracked, strong tornado struck Kinderhook, Barry, Bloomfield, and Winchester, Illinois, injuring three on its 64.2 mi (103.3 km) path.

April 25 was the most violent and deadly day of the sequence. Just after midnight, a strong F2 tornado injured one in Jasper, Missouri. That afternoon, a large, long-tracked, violent 550 yd (500 m) wide F4 tornado plowed through Marion, Knighthood Village, Harrisburg, Huber, Waterloo, and Boston, Indiana as well as West Florence and Eaton, Ohio, injuring seven on its 63.1 mi (101.5 km) path. A fatal F2 tornado then struck Blanchester, Midland, Jonesboro and Martinsville, Ohio before passing north of New Vienna, Highland, and Leesburg, killing two and injuring four. Another F2 tornado then injured two southeast of Clarksville, Tennessee. Limited tornado activity occurred over the next four days with an F2 tornado injuring two in Spring Hill, Alabama on April 27, an F3 tornado causing major damage in Rogers Manor, Delaware on April 28, and an F2 tornado striking western Corpus Christi, Texas on April 29. On April 30, the final day of the sequence, an outbreak of nine tornadoes struck the Great Plains, although the only one to casualties was an intense F3 tornado, the strongest one of the day, that struck northern Minco, Oklahoma, injuring two.

Overall, the series of tornadoes killed three and injured 38.

== May ==
There were 137 tornadoes confirmed in the U.S. in May.

=== May 3–9 ===
FU	F0	F1	F2	F3	F4	F5
0	16	17	29	9	2	0

A massive outbreak sequence of 73 tornadoes hit areas from Utah to New York and Florida. The first major event occurred on May 3, when twin F2 and F0 tornadoes caused damage in Dougherty, Texas. The next day, a rare, strong F2 tornado caused minor damage in Green River, Utah, becoming the second of only 10 F2+ tornadoes ever recorded in Utah since 1950. Later, an F3 tornado caused the first casualty of the outbreak when it struck Geary, Oklahoma, killing one.

On May 5, a brief but strong F2 tornado struck far northern St. Petersburg, heavily damaging the area. A large, violent, catastrophic 400 yd (370 m) wide F4 tornado then hit southeastern Talihina, Reichert, Glendale, and Howe, Oklahoma, killing 16 and injuring 58. That evening, a series of four tornadoes caused casualties in Arkansas. A strong F2 tornado killed one and injured four in Pleasant Valley. Next, a large F2 tornado struck Piney, outside of Hot Springs, injuring six. An even larger, 833 yd (762 m) wide F1 tornado then struck Conway, injuring three. Just after midnight the next day, another F1 tornado then hit southeastern Little Rock, injuring three.

Overnight on May 6–7, tornadoes caused major damage and multiple casualties. A large, long-tracked F3 tornado–which was likely a tornado family–tore through Witmer Lake, Witmer Manor, Webers Landing, northern Wolcottville, Blackman Lake, northern South Milford, Woodland Park, Big Long Lake, Shady Nook, Gravel Beach, Timberhurst, Taylor Lake, Turkey Creek, Forest Park, Hamilton Lake, Oakwood, and Circle Park, Indiana as well as Edon, Ohio, injuring five. A deadly F2 tornado struck Midway, Arkansas, killing two and injuring six. Just after midnight, a massive, 1 mile (1.6 km) wide F3 tornado tore through Bruno, western Yellville, and Summit, killing three and injuring nine. A long-tracked, large F3 tornado then ripped through Hand Valley, Gassville, Colfax, western Mountain Home, and Clarkridge, Arkansas, as well as southern Udall, Egypt Grove, Hocomo, and South Fork, Missouri, injuring 10 on its 43.8 mi (70.5 km) path. Another large, long-tracked, 1/2 mi (0.80 km) wide F3 tornado hit Madisonville, northern Millport, Bremen Station, Bremen, Moorman, Centertown, Beaver Dam, Mt. Pleasant, Arnold, Dogwalk, Neafus, and Peth, injuring three on its 58 mi (93 km) path.

Later that afternoon, a violent F4 tornado tracked through southern Fairmount and northern Wolcott, Kansas as well as Waldron, Weatherby Lake, Barry, extreme northern Kansas City, and northern Liberty, Missouri, injuring 12. Later, the same cell produced an F2 tornado that injured two as it passed south and north of Swanwick and Richmond, Missouri respectfully. An F3 also injured one in Bluejacket, Oklahoma. The final tornado to cause casualties, as well as the final tornado of the outbreak occurred two days later on May 9 when an F2 tornado injured four in Liberty and Bradley, New York.

Overall, the outbreak sequence caused 23 fatalities and 126 injuries.

=== May 30–31 ===
FU	F0	F1	F2	F3	F4	F5
0	3	2	1	2	1	0

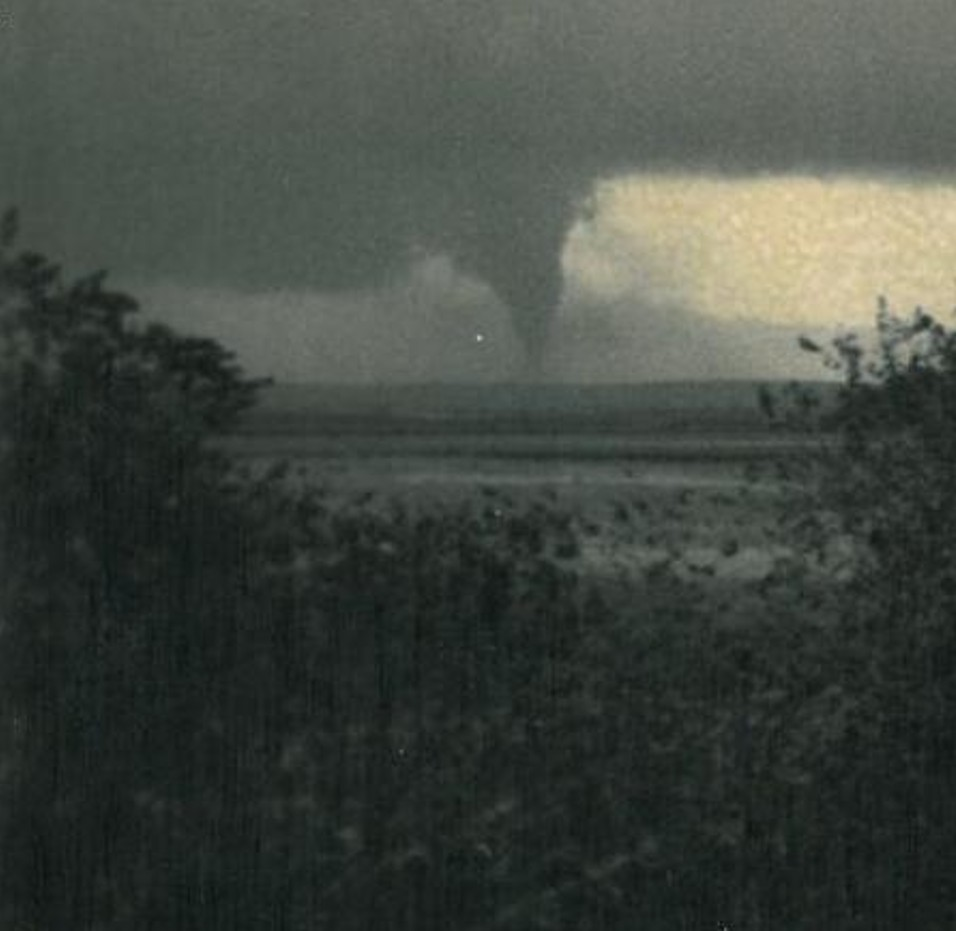
A large tornado seen west of Ord, Nebraska on May 30. This tornado was rated F5 by Grazulis.

Nine tornadoes touched down across the Great Plains. On May 30, three long-tracked tornadoes, one rated F4 and two rated F3, traveled 48.1 miles (77.4 km) along identical paths, causing major destruction in Anselmo, northern New Helena, southern Sargent, and northern Ord. However, Grazulis determined it was a single tornado with an F5 rating. The next day, a brief, but strong F2 tornado damaged eastern Belleville, Kansas. Overall, despite causing considerable damage, there were no casualties from the tornadoes.

== June ==
There were 107 tornadoes confirmed in the US in June.

=== June 8–9 ===
FU	F0	F1	F2	F3	F4	F5
0	1	0	3	2	0	0

Six tornadoes touched down across five states. On June 8, an F2 tornado caused an injury in Rahns, Pennsylvania. The next day, a catastrophic F3 tornado passed through Crystal, Kentucky east of Pryse, killing one and injuring 63. The final tornado of the period was another strong F3 tornado that caused significant damage in Brooklyn Park, Maryland. In the end, the tornadoes left one dead and 64 injured.

=== June 21 ===
FU	F0	F1	F2	F3	F4	F5
0	0	1	2	1	0	0

Four tornadoes touched down across three states. First, an F2 tornado damaged areas southeast of Kenansville, North Carolina. Next, an F1 tornado injured one north of Mt. Olive, North Carolina. Another injury then occurred when another F2 tornado struck Marion, South Carolina. The last tornado was also the worst: a very long-tracked F3 tornado moved southeast through James, western Verdon, eastern Conde, northeastern Raymond, Willow Lake, Cherry Lake, Plum Lake, western Erwin, Lake Preston, Lake Wildwood, eastern Oldham, eastern Ramona, and northeastern Madison, South Dakota before abruptly turning northeast, striking eastern Nunda, Mud Lake, and western Brookings. One person was killed and seven others were injured along the tornado's 156.3 mi (251.5 km) path. Overall, the tornadoes killed one and injured nine.

=== June 28–30 ===
FU	F0	F1	F2	F3	F4	F5
0	1	4	4	0	1	0

A small outbreak sequence of 10 narrow tornadoes hit the Great Plains and Maine. On June 29, a violent F4 tornado struck Glendive, Montana, injuring one. As of 2024, this is the only violent tornado recorded in Montana since 1950. There were no casualties from the other tornadoes produced during the period.

== July ==
There were 77 tornadoes confirmed in the US in July.

=== July 28–29 ===
FU	F0	F1	F2	F3	F4	F5
0	2	2	3	2	0	0

Nine tornadoes hit Illinois, Indiana, Ohio, and Pennsylvania. The first strong tornado of the outbreak was a brief F2 tornado that hit Idaville, Indiana on July 28. Next, another brief F2 tornado injured two in Redkey, Indiana. This was followed by F3 tornado that hit Union City, Indiana before moving through Union City, Ansonia, Dawn, Versailles and Russia, Ohio, injuring two. Another F3 tornado severely damaged Sidney, Ohio, injuring 22. The next day, an isolated, but large, strong 500 yd (460 m) F2 tornado moved through East York, northern Locust Grove, south Stonybrook, Yorkana, East Prospect, Washington Boro, Youngstown, Central Manor, Windom, Millersville, Bausman, southern Lancaster and Fertility, Pennsylvania, injuring two. Overall, the outbreak injured 28.

== August ==
There were 27 tornadoes confirmed in the US in August.

== September ==
There were 53 tornadoes confirmed in the US in September.

=== September 1–4 ===
FU	F0	F1	F2	F3	F4	F5
0	1	6	5	1	1	0

An outbreak sequence of 14 tornadoes hit the Midwest, Great Lakes, and Northeast. It started with an F1 tornado striking Baudette, Minnesota on September 1. Next, a violent F4 tornado tore through northern Bristow, Wilmar, southeastern Packard, and northern Plainfield, injuring seven. Later, an F1 tornado injured four in western Rock Falls, Illinois. The next day, an F2 tornado caused major damage west of Fairbank, Iowa. The following day, an F3 tornado damaged O'Brien, Texas. The outbreak sequence ended on September 4 with a rare F2 tornado in Malbons Mills, Maine. In the end, the outbreak injured 12.

=== September 10–13 (Hurricane Carla) ===
FU	F0	F1	F2	F3	F4	F5
0	1	6	6	7	1	0

Hurricane Carla triggered a tornado outbreak in Alabama, Louisiana, Texas, Arkansas, and Michigan before, during, and after making landfall in Matagorda Island, Texas and accelerating as it turned to the northeast through the Midwest and the Great Lakes. On September 10, an F3 tornado swept through Kaplan and Cossinade, Louisiana, killing one and injuring 55. Later, an F2 tornado hit downtown Morgan City, Louisiana injuring 16. The next day, an F2 tornado injured two west of Alton, Louisiana. An F3 tornado hit southern Jacksonville, Texas, injuring three. Another F3 tornado then hit Channelview, Texas, injuring 22.

The worst day of the outbreak occurred on September 12, when six significant (F2+) touched down, causing 250 casualties. It began with an early-morning, violent F4 tornado that moved across Galveston Island, causing eight deaths and 200 injuries while becoming the first of only two violent tornadoes ever spawned by a hurricane (the other one was in 1964). An additional F3 tornado caused more damage in Galveston just under three hours later. Another F3 tornado caused damage in Hardin, Texas before a large, deadly, 400 yd (370 m) wide F3 tornado killed five and injured 37 when it passed through Jonesboro and Hodge, Louisiana. Another F3 tornado caused damage in Fulbright, Texas. The final tornado of the outbreak occurred the next day in Latex, Texas, causing F2 damage and injuring two.

Overall, 21 tornadoes touched down, eight of them in Texas, killing 14 people and injuring 337 others.

=== September 13–15 (Tropical Storm Six) ===
FU	F0	F1	F2	F3	F4	F5
0	0	0	2	0	0	0

As Tropical Storm Six moved up the East Coast, it spawned a brief F2 tornado in Savannah, Georgia that blew the roof off of a lumber company building, causing $25,000 in damage. There were no casualties. Two days later, another F2 tornado/waterspout tracked 19.1 miles (30.7 km) from Beals through Roque Bluffs before dissipating in Dog Town just east of East Machias, Maine, injuring one.

=== September 22–24 ===
FU	F0	F1	F2	F3	F4	F5
0	0	4	4	1	0	0

Nine tornadoes hit five states. The first tornado of the outbreak was an F2 tornado that passed southeast of Lima Center and Whitewater, Wisconsin on September 22, injuring one. Later, a gigantic, 2,000 yd (1,800 m) wide F2 tornado hit Marne, Michigan (just northwest of Grand Rapids), also injuring one. On September 24, a long-tracked F3 tornado struck Daleville, Farmland, and Union City, Indiana, injuring one. An F2 tornado then passed east Marissa, Illinois, also injuring one. The final tornado of the outbreak then became the only fatal one of the outbreak when it touched down west of Grafton, Illinois at F1 intensity, killing one. Overall, the tornadoes killed one and injured four.

== October ==
There were 14 tornadoes confirmed in the US in October.

== November ==
There were 36 tornadoes confirmed in the US in November.

=== November 22–23 ===
FU	F0	F1	F2	F3	F4	F5
0	4	6	7	3	0	0

An outbreak of 20 tornadoes struck the Southeast. On November 22, an F3 tornado hit the southwestern San Antonio, Texas, causing major damage. Another F3 tornado then blew through Trawick and Mount Enterprise, Texas, killing one and injuring 10. Later, another F3 tornado injured one in Hungerford, Texas. An F2 tornado injured three in LaPlace, Louisiana while an F2 tornado in Ellisville, Mississippi, an F1 tornado east of Holt, Florida and an F2 tornado in Apalachicola, Florida, which occurred in the early morning hours of November 23, all injured one. The final tornado to cause casualties was an F1 tornado that injured one south of Canadys, South Carolina. In the end, the tornadoes killed one and injured 18.

== December ==
There were 16 tornadoes confirmed in the US in December.

=== December 10–12 ===
FU	F0	F1	F2	F3	F4	F5
0	1	6	3	3	0	0

An outbreak sequence of 13 tornadoes struck the Southeast. On December 10, an isolated but destructive morning F3 tornado injured one in Brewton, Alabama. The next day, a weak but damaging F0 tornado injured three in DeRidder, Louisiana. Later, an F3 tornado caused major damage in Jacksonville, Alabama. Another F3 tornado injured three in Marion, Alabama. The final significant tornado occurred early on December 12 when an F2 tornado caused considerable damage in rural Sumter County, Alabama. In the end, the outbreak injured six.

=== December 17–18 ===
FU	F0	F1	F2	F3	F4	F5
0	0	1	2	0	0	0

The final three tornadoes of 1961 struck the Southeast. On November 17, an F1 tornado hit Tuckers Crossing, Mississippi. Next, an F2 tornado injured one southeast of Marion, Alabama. The next morning, the final F2 tornado damaged Valdosta, Georgia. In the end, only one person was injured by the tornadoes.

== See also ==
- Tornado
  - Tornadoes by year
  - Tornado records
  - Tornado climatology
  - Tornado myths
- List of tornado outbreaks
  - List of F5 and EF5 tornadoes
  - List of North American tornadoes and tornado outbreaks
  - List of 21st-century Canadian tornadoes and tornado outbreaks
  - List of European tornadoes and tornado outbreaks
  - List of tornadoes and tornado outbreaks in Asia
  - List of Southern Hemisphere tornadoes and tornado outbreaks
  - List of tornadoes striking downtown areas
  - List of tornadoes with confirmed satellite tornadoes
- Tornado intensity
  - Fujita scale
  - Enhanced Fujita scale
