= Tornado outbreak sequence of May 3–9, 1961 =

Weather event in the United States

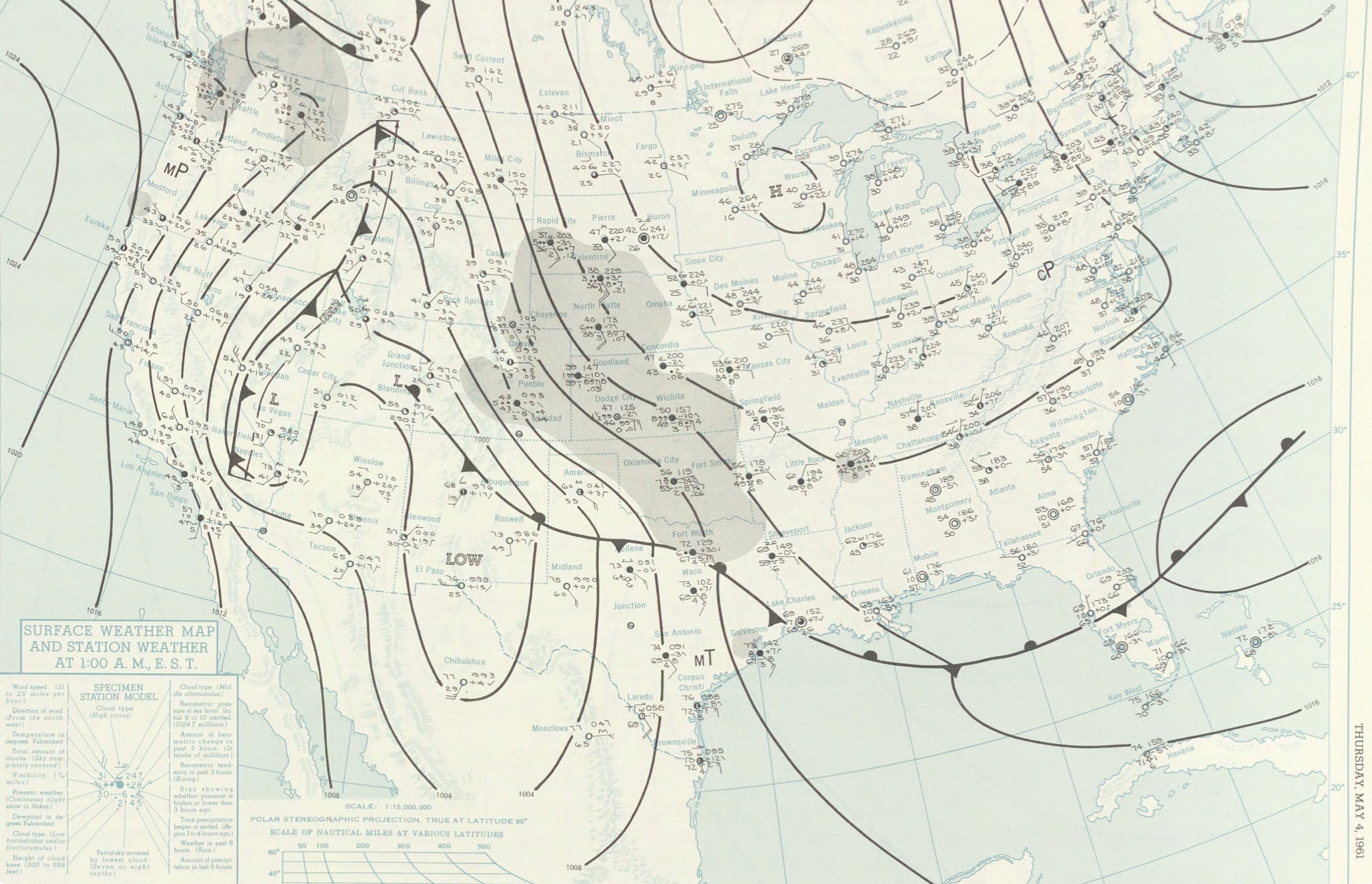
- Surface weather analysis on May 4

Meteorological history
- Formed: May 3, 1961
- Dissipated: May 9, 1961

Tornado outbreak
- Tornadoes: 73
- Max. rating: F4 tornado
- Duration: 6 days, 16 hours, 10 minutes
- Highest gusts: 105 miles per hour (169 km/h)
- Largest hail: 3 inches (7.6 cm) (Note: One hailstone reportedly reached 9.99 inches (25.4 cm) in diameter in Indiana, but this is more likely an error in the system.)
- Max. snowfall: 8 inches (20 cm)

Overall effects
- Fatalities: 23
- Injuries: 126
- Damage: $42.205 million (1961 USD)
- Areas affected: Great Plains, Mississippi Valley, Midwest, Northeastern, Mid-Atlantic, and Southeastern United States
- Part of the tornado outbreaks of 1961

A large, weeklong tornado outbreak sequence (Note: An outbreak is generally defined as a group of at least six tornadoes (the number sometimes varies slightly according to local climatology) with no more than a six-hour gap between individual tornadoes. An outbreak sequence, prior to (after) the start of modern records in 1950, is defined as a period of no more than two (one) consecutive days without at least one significant (F2 or stronger) tornado.) of 73 tornadoes occurred on May 3–9, 1961, impacting areas from Utah to the East Coast of the United States. Overall, the outbreak sequence caused 23 fatalities, 126 injuries, and $42.205 million in damages (1961 USD).

== Meteorological synopsis ==
Multiple weather systems impacted mostly the Great Plains and Midwest, bringing multiple rounds of severe weather and tornadoes throughout the region starting on May 3 and ending on May 9. Other weather systems also produced tornadoes in Florida and Utah.

== Confirmed tornadoes ==
Confirmed tornadoes by Fujita rating
FU	F0	F1	F2	F3	F4	F5	Total
0	16	17	29	9	2	0	73

=== May 3 event ===
List of confirmed tornadoes – Wednesday, May 3, 1961 (Note: All dates are based on the local time zone where the tornado touched down; however, all times are in Coordinated Universal Time and dates are split at midnight CST/CDT for consistency.) (Note: Prior to 1994, only the average widths of tornado paths were officially listed.)
F#	Location	County / Parish	State	Start coord.	Time (UTC)	Path length	Max. width	Summary
F1	E of Comanche	Stephens	OK	34.37°N 97.93°W	08:00–?	0.1 miles (0.16 km)	33 yards (30 m)	A brief, weak tornado destroyed a shed, causing $2,500 in damage. There was no condensation funnel, but a loud roaring noise was heard.
F1	SE of Glenn to Afton to S of Guthrie	Dickens, King	TX	33.78°N 100.83°W	21:00–?	38.3 miles (61.6 km)	33 yards (30 m)	This long-tracked tornado moved over open ranch country, causing little to no damage.
F2	Dougherty (1st tornado)	Floyd	TX	33.95°N 101.08°W	00:00–00:10	2.7 miles (4.3 km)	100 yards (91 m)	Twin tornadoes formed north of Dougherty after one tornado split into two. This one, which was smaller than the other, hit the town, destroying three trailers and a barn, ripping a porch off a house, and overturning several cotton trailers. Damage was estimated at $25,000.
F0	Dougherty (2nd tornado)	Floyd	TX	33.93°N 101.07°W	00:00–00:10	2 miles (3.2 km)	100 yards (91 m)	This tornado split off the F2 tornado above. It was larger than the other one, but remained over open country east of town, causing no damage.
F0	NE of Silverton	Briscoe	TX	34.65°N 101.17°W	00:30–?	0.1 miles (0.16 km)	10 yards (9.1 m)	A brief tornado in the Palo Duro Canyon caused no damage.

=== May 4 event ===
List of confirmed tornadoes – Thursday, May 4, 1961
F#	Location	County / Parish	State	Start coord.	Time (UTC)	Path length	Max. width	Summary
F0	E of Canadian	Hemphill	TX	35.75°N 100.17°W	20:00–20:15	8.4 miles (13.5 km)	10 yards (9.1 m)	This tornado remained over open ranch country, causing no damage.
F2	Green River	Emery, Grand	UT	38.98°N 110.17°W	21:00–?	9.4 miles (15.1 km)	67 yards (61 m)	A rare, strong tornado struck Green River, although only mostly minor damage occurred with losses totaling $2,500. This was the second of only 13 F2/EF2+ tornadoes ever recorded in Utah since 1950. Tornado researcher Thomas P. Grazulis did not classify the tornado as an F2 or stronger.
F2	W of Cheyenne to NE of Strong City	Roger Mills	OK	35.60°N 99.80°W	21:00–21:40	23.5 miles (37.8 km)	200 yards (180 m)	A long-lived, large, multi-vortex tornado tracked mainly over open terrain. A few outbuildings, an abandoned house and schoolhouse, utility lines and fences were destroyed and very large hail up to the size of baseballs damaged crops. The tornado hurled cars off a nearby highway as well. Losses from the tornado totaled $25,000.
F2	W of Bogata	Red River	TX	33.47°N 95.27°W	21:00–?	0.8 miles (1.3 km)	1,000 yards (910 m)	This large tornado blew the roofs off of several farmhouses and swept away outbuildings. As it crossed US 271, a boat and trailer were blown off of a moving vehicle and thrown into the field a considerable distance away. Windows were blown out of homes as well. Despite the damage, no monetary damage value was given. Grazulis did not list the tornado as an F2 or stronger.
F1	Leedey	Dewey	OK	35.87°N 99.33°W	22:00–?	1 mile (1.6 km)	400 yards (370 m)	A tornado struck the town of Leedey, destroying outbuildings and unroofing two businesses. 1-inch-diameter (2.5 cm) hail also fell east of town. No damage value was given.
F2	NE of Leedey	Dewey	OK	35.88°N 99.33°W	22:15–?	1 mile (1.6 km)	400 yards (370 m)	This strong tornado touched down north of the previous one. There was $2,500 in damage. Grazulis did not list the tornado as an F2 or stronger.
F3	Geary	Blaine, Canadian	OK	35.63°N 98.35°W	23:40–?	9.5 miles (15.3 km)	10 yards (9.1 m)	1 death – This was the first of a complex of three tornadoes that formed over a 30-mile-long (48 km) path. More than 20 farmsteads were severely damaged or destroyed both in and around Geary, including one demolished building where a person was killed. The tornado, which caused $25,000 in damage, may have been up to 800 yards (730 m) wide.
F2	W of Okarche	Canadian, Kingfisher	OK	35.70°N 98.20°W	00:15–?	9 miles (14 km)	10 yards (9.1 m)	This was the second of a complex of three tornadoes that formed over a 30-mile-long (48 km) path. A schoolhouse was partly unroofed, and a three-story frame home was destroyed. Nearby farmsteads were also severely damaged or destroyed. The tornado, which caused $25,000 in damage, may have been up to 800 yards (730 m) wide.
F1	WNW of Okarche to SSE of Kingfisher	Kingfisher	OK	35.75°N 98.05°W	00:30–?	9 miles (14 km)	10 yards (9.1 m)	This was the third of a complex of three tornadoes that formed over a 30-mile-long (48 km) path. Farmsteads were severely damaged or destroyed. The tornado, which caused $25,000 in damage, may have been up to 800 yards (730 m) wide.
F3	SE of Fort Stockton	Pecos	TX	30.53°N 102.37°W	00:30–?	1.1 miles (1.8 km)	10 yards (9.1 m)	This strong tornado touched down on the Johnny Bravo ranch in rural Pecos County well southeast of Fort Stockton, demolishing the ranch's headquarters, several barns and outbuildings, and three trucks, killing several horses and injuring one (although the injury was not officially counted). It supposedly lifted before touching down again on the Ligon ranch, destroying the ranch house, a windmill, and several outbuildings. Damage was estimated at $250,000. Storm Data list the tornado as happening on May 3 rather than May 4. Grazulis classified the tornado as an F2.
F1	S of Okarche to Piedmont	Canadian	OK	35.70°N 97.97°W	00:45–?	12.6 miles (20.3 km)	10 yards (9.1 m)	This tornado damaged several farmsteads and 2-inch-diameter (5.1 cm) hail damaged 70 windows in Piedmont. Losses from the tornado totaled $2,500.
F2	S of Arnett	Ellis	OK	36.03°N 99.8°W	02:00–?	0.1 miles (0.16 km)	10 yards (9.1 m)	A brief, but strong tornado destroyed outbuildings and uprooted trees on a farm, causing $2,500 in damage. Witnesses in Arnett saw the funnel from the tornado southwest of town. Grazulis did not list the tornado as an F2 or stronger.
F0	NW of Yukon	Canadian	OK	35.55°N 97.80°W	02:25–?	0.1 miles (0.16 km)	10 yards (9.1 m)	Police reported a tornado on the ground moving east over open country. There was no damage.
F0	W of Paducah	Cottle	TX	34.03°N 100.50°W	04:00–?	0.1 miles (0.16 km)	10 yards (9.1 m)	A weak, narrow tornado damaged mesquites on the old Metador ranch, causing no monetary damages. Storm Data list the tornado as happening on May 3 rather than May 4.

=== May 5 event ===
List of confirmed tornadoes – Friday, May 5, 1961
F#	Location	County / Parish	State	Start coord.	Time (UTC)	Path length	Max. width	Summary
F0	NNW of Cheyenne Wells	Cheyenne	CO	39.03°N 102.53°W	22:00–?	0.1 miles (0.16 km)	10 yards (9.1 m)	A pilot reported a tornado on the Claybank Route. There was no damage.
F2	Northern St. Petersburg	Pinellas	FL	27.75°N 82.63°W	22:15–?	0.5 miles (0.80 km)	50 yards (46 m)	See section on this tornado – There was $25,000 in damage.
F4	Southeastern Talihina to Reichert to Howe	Le Flore	OK	34.73°N 95.03°W	23:20–?	26.4 miles (42.5 km)	400 yards (370 m)	16 deaths – This violent, catastrophic tornado first touched down southeast of Talihina, where an outbuilding on a farmstead was destroyed. It then moved through 12 miles (19 km) of forest in rural areas as it crossed over the Winding Stair Mountains, although there is a possibility that the tornado lifted, and a new tornado formed. As it came down Brushy Mountain, it became violent and struck Reichert, obliterating almost everything in its path. It then crossed the Yellow Spring Ridge and Potts Mountain and moved through both Glendale and Howe, completely destroying more buildings and homes before dissipating. In all, at least 70 homes were damaged or destroyed. It caused the most casualties during the outbreak, with 16 deaths and 58 injuries, along with $250,000 in damage.
F3	Hugo	Choctaw	OK	34.02°N 95.50°W	00:30–?	0.1 miles (0.16 km)	10 yards (9.1 m)	This brief but intense tornado unroofed two large buildings and uprooted many large trees, causing $25,000 in damage. The funnel cloud of the tornado was spotted on the northwest side of town before it touched down. Grazulis did not list the tornado as an F2 or stronger.
F2	NE of Bethel to NW of Smithville	McCurtain	OK	34.40°N 94.80°W	02:00–?	9.5 miles (15.3 km)	400 yards (370 m)	A strong tornado tracked over Boktuklo Mountains, destroying timber on an irregular path. There was no monetary damage value given. Grazulis did not list the tornado as an F2 or stronger.
F2	Pleasant Valley	Pope	AR	35.45°N 93.13°W	02:30–?	1 mile (1.6 km)	50 yards (46 m)	1 death – This strong tornado touched down 1 mile (1.6 km) north of Dover and moved northeastward. A house in the path was destroyed, killing one person and injuring four others. A car, truck and tractor were damaged as well, and losses totaled $25,000.
F2	Piney	Garland	AR	34.52°N 93.13°W	03:00–?	2 miles (3.2 km)	300 yards (270 m)	A large, strong tornado touched down along Thornton Ferry Road and moved northeast along it, striking the Western Hot Springs suburb of Piney. A total of 25 homes were damaged or destroyed, six people were injured, and losses totaled $250,000. One source list the injury count as five.
F1	Conway	Faulkner	AR	35.07°N 92.43°W	04:30–?	2.5 miles (4.0 km)	833 yards (762 m)	A large tornado touched down southwest of Conway and moved northeast lifting just before reaching the heart of the city. Six homes were damaged, several barns and garages were damaged or destroyed, trees and power lines were downed, and utility services were disrupted. One of the homes was unroofed as well. There were three minor injuries and $25,000 in damage. Grazulis classified the tornado as an F2.

=== May 6 event ===
List of confirmed tornadoes – Saturday, May 6, 1961
F#	Location	County / Parish	State	Start coord.	Time (UTC)	Path length	Max. width	Summary
F1	Southeastern Little Rock	Pulaski	AR	34.63°N 92.25°W	06:15–?	1 mile (1.6 km)	200 yards (180 m)	A tornado moved from west to east along East Roosevelt Road on the southeastern side of Little Rock. A drive-in theater screen was destroyed while a second one was damaged, roofs and signs were extensively damaged, some buildings had structural damage, and trees were blown down. Three people were injured and losses totaled $250,000.
F1	W of Stilwell	Adair	OK	35.82°N 94.70°W	21:00–?	0.8 miles (1.3 km)	10 yards (9.1 m)	Farmsteads were damaged, and fences and timber were torn up. Losses totaled $2,500.
F1	E of De Soto to SW of Festus	Jefferson	MO	38.15°N 90.53°W	22:15–?	5.7 miles (9.2 km)	50 yards (46 m)	Several witnesses spotted this tornado south and east of De Soto moving northeastward. Trees, barns, and roofs of homes were damaged, and losses totaled $25,000.
F0	NE of Elkhart	Elkhart	IN	41.73°N 85.95°W	00:30–?	0.1 miles (0.16 km)	10 yards (9.1 m)	A brief tornado over an open field caused no damage.
F0	W of Melrose	Cherokee	KS	37.03°N 95.02°W	00:30–?	0.1 miles (0.16 km)	10 yards (9.1 m)	A small, brief tornado damaged a barn, although no damage value given.
F3	Witmer Lake, IN to Hamilton Lake, IN to Edon, OH	LaGrange (IN), Steuben (IN), Williams (OH)	IN, OH	41.53°N 85.42°W	02:02–02:40	33.4 miles (53.8 km)	800 yards (730 m)	See section on this tornado – Five people were injured and losses totaled $5.025 million.
F0	Forest Hill	Le Flore	OK	34.90°N 94.60°W	03:30–?	0.1 miles (0.16 km)	10 yards (9.1 m)	Civil Defense spotters reported that a funnel cloud briefly touched down southeast of Howe. No damage occurred.
F1	N of Burlington	Kit Carson	CO	39.35°N 102.27°W	04:30–?	0.1 miles (0.16 km)	10 yards (9.1 m)	A small tornado damaged farm buildings and equipment with losses totaling $2,500.
F2	Midway	White, Jackson, Independence	AR	35.53°N 91.58°W	05:30–?	1.5 miles (2.4 km)	300 yards (270 m)	2 deaths – A strong, multi-vortex tornado tore through Midway, destroying five homes, a church, and a gas station while damaging several other buildings. Six people were injured and losses totaled $250,000. Rain from the storm also damaged strawberries.
F0	Southern Moore	Cleveland	OK	35.30°N 97.50°W	05:50–?	0.1 miles (0.16 km)	10 yards (9.1 m)	The police department spotted this tornado crossing a highway between Norman and Moore. It remained over open country and caused no damage.
F2	Oil Trough to Paroquet	Independence	AR	35.65°N 91.43°W	05:56–06:06	5.6 miles (9.0 km)	200 yards (180 m)	A strong tornado struck Oil Trough and Blackland, destroying six homes and causing considerable damage to other buildings. Barns were obliterated as well. Losses total $250,000.

=== May 7 event ===
List of confirmed tornadoes – Sunday, May 7, 1961
F#	Location	County / Parish	State	Start coord.	Time (UTC)	Path length	Max. width	Summary
F0	Moore	Cleveland	OK	35.35°N 97.50°W	06:45–?	0.1 miles (0.16 km)	10 yards (9.1 m)	A funnel cloud that was spotted east-southeast of Will Rogers Field briefly touched down in Moore, causing no damage.
F3	Bruno to Western Yellville to Summit	Marion	AR	36.12°N 92.78°W	07:00–07:25	14.2 miles (22.9 km)	1,760 yards (1,610 m)	3 deaths – A tornado formed on the south side of Bruno and passed east of town as it meandered northeast. It moved over rugged, rural terrain for a while before growing tremendously as it approached Yellville. It intensified before crossing over Crooked Creek into the western side of the town, causing major damage to the area. It then reached its maximum width as it tore through Summit at F3 intensity, inflicting widespread extensive damage to homes, buildings, and trees. All the casualties from the storm occurred here. Timber along the path was also damaged by the tornado. After moving out of Summit, the tornado quickly narrowed and weakened and dissipated in a rural area north of town. It all, the tornado destroyed 30 buildings and damaged 50 others along its path. Three people were killed, nine (possibly 12) others were injured, and losses totaled $2.5 million in damage. Heavy rainfall from the storm also damaged crops and roadways as well.
F2	W of Faulkner to Hallowell	Cherokee	KS	37.10°N 95.02°W	08:00–?	5.7 miles (9.2 km)	10 yards (9.1 m)	A skipping tornado developed west of the Faulkner school and moved northeastward, damaging buildings on several farms each time it touched down. Losses totaled $25,000. Grazulis did not list the tornado as an F2 or stronger.
F2	Pindall to Freck	Searcy, Marion	AR	36.07°N 92.87°W	08:00–?	10.8 miles (17.4 km)	333 yards (304 m)	Several houses and buildings were damaged, and trees were uprooted in both towns hit by this tornado. Losses totaled $25,000. Grazulis did not list the tornado as an F2 or stronger.
F3	Hand Valley, AR to Southern Udall, MO to South Fork, MO	Marion (AR), Baxter (AR), Ozark (MO), Howell (MO)	AR, MO	36.20°N 92.50°W	08:15–09:30	43.8 miles (70.5 km)	333 yards (304 m)	See section on this tornado – A total of 10 people were injured and losses totaled $3.5 million.
F2	NE of Porter	Wagoner	OK	35.90°N 95.50°W	10:00–?	0.1 miles (0.16 km)	10 yards (9.1 m)	A strong tornado hit an isolated area with no monetary damages reported. Grazulis did not list the tornado as an F2 or stronger.
F2	N of Clinton to NE of South Highland	Hickman, Graves	KY	36.70°N 89.00°W	14:15–14:45	22.1 miles (35.6 km)	10 yards (9.1 m)	A narrow, but strong tornado moved due east, passing north of Nichols, Baltimore, and Pryorsburg before passing south of Mayfield. Several outbuildings and five barns were destroyed and damage estimates totaled $25,000.
F2	W of Reserve	Brown	KS	39.97°N 95.62°W	14:20–?	0.1 miles (0.16 km)	10 yards (9.1 m)	A small, brief but strong tornado demolished a farm plant, destroying all but the house, which was removed from its foundation and hit by the debris from the other buildings. Losses totaled $25,000.
F3	E of Stamford	Shackelford, Haskell	TX	32.93°N 99.58°W	14:55–15:00	3.6 miles (5.8 km)	133 yards (122 m)	One of three funnel clouds touched down four times, destroying one home, heavily damaging two others, and causing minor damage to a fourth one in the Berryhill and Cobb communities. Several roofs and walls were torn apart, including a 4-foot-long (1.2 m) brick segment. A car had its back window blown out as well. There was $250,000 in damage. The roar from the tornado was heard all the Stamford, which was 12 miles (19 km) away. Grazulis classified the tornado as an F2.
F3	Madisonville to Moorman to Peth	Hopkins, Muhlenberg, Ohio, Grayson	KY	37.33°N 87.52°W	15:25–16:30	58 miles (93 km)	880 yards (800 m)	See section on this tornado – Three people were injured, and losses totaled $15 million. Tornado researcher Thomas P. Grazulis gave the tornado an F2 rating.
F0	NW of Tonganoxie	Leavenworth	KS	39.12°N 95.1°W	21:00–?	0.1 miles (0.16 km)	10 yards (9.1 m)	Some tornado damage occurred northwest of Tonganoxie, although there was no monetary damage value given.
F4	Southern Fairmount, KS to Waldron, MO to Northern Liberty, MO	Leavenworth (KS), Wyandotte (KS), Platte (MO), Clay (MO)	KS, MO	39.17°N 94.93°W	21:15–22:31	26.2 miles (42.2 km)	150 yards (140 m)	This violent, multi-vortex tornado first touched down north-northwest of Basehor, Kansas on the south side of Fairmount. It moved east-northeast and quickly intensified as neared the Missouri River, turning east-southeast and then east north of Wolcott. About 40-50 homes were damaged and a car was thrown 300 feet (91 m) over a 50 feet (15 m) grove of trees before landing upside down on railroad tracks, injuring the three women inside. Nine other injuries occurred over this part of the track as well. The tornado then crossed the Missouri River into Missouri, striking the town Waldron before striking Weatherby Lake and Barry, where more damage occurred. The tornado continued to cause damage as it moved through the extreme northern part Kansas City as well as the north side of Liberty before dissipating. In all, 12 (one source lists 11) people were injured, and damage was estimated at $10.75 million.
F1	N of Blackwell to De Soto	Jefferson	MO	38.07°N 90.63°W	22:15–?	5.6 miles (9.0 km)	50 yards (46 m)	Several witnesses observed this tornado damaging trees as well as the roofs of homes and barns south and east of De Soto. Damage was estimated at $2,500. Storm Data list the tornado as happening on May 6 rather than May 7.
F2	SSW of Swanwick to NE of Richmond	Ray	MO	39.30°N 94.05°W	23:30–23:45	7.3 miles (11.7 km)	50 yards (46 m)	This strong tornado, which came from the same cell that produced the Kansas City F4 tornado, ripped through the north side of Richmond, destroying a total of six barns and four homes. Two people were injured, and losses totaled $50,000. Grazulis classified the tornado as a high-end F3.
F2	WNW of Carrollton to ENE of Standish	Carroll	MO	39.38°N 93.62°W	00:00–00:20	9.6 miles (15.4 km)	50 yards (46 m)	This strong tornado came from the same cell that produced the Kansas City F4 and Richmond F2 tornadoes. Losses totaled $50,000. Grazulis did not list the tornado as an F2 or stronger.
F2	SE of Fairfax to N of Pawhuska	Osage	OK	36.5°N 96.7°W	00:06–?	0.1 miles (0.16 km)	10 yards (9.1 m)	This strong tornado damaged a wide swath of blackjack timber along a 5-mile-long (8.0 km) path (although official data list it as only being a brief tornado). One farmstead was completely destroyed and 1.5 miles (2.4 km) of utility lines were blown down. Damage was estimated at $25,000. Grazulis classified the tornado as an F3 and listed a total path length of 16 mi (26 km).
F0	SE of Avian	Montgomery	KS	37.08°N 95.57°W	02:15–?	0.1 miles (0.16 km)	10 yards (9.1 m)	A small, brief tornado was spotted northeast of Coffeyville. No damage occurred.
F3	Bluejacket to W of Dotyville	Craig, Ottawa	OK	36.80°N 95.10°W	03:05–?	8.9 miles (14.3 km)	400 yards (370 m)	This large, intense tornado significantly damaged or destroyed 14 farmsteads west and north of Bluejacket while also obliterating a trailer, injuring the man inside. Utilities and trees were heavily damaged as well and losses totaled $250,000. Hail up to 3/4 in (1.9 cm) accompanied the tornado. Grazulis classified the tornado as an F2.
F2	NE of Cleo Springs to S of Helena	Major, Alfalfa	OK	36.45°N 98.35°W	04:15–?	4.9 miles (7.9 km)	10 yards (9.1 m)	A strong tornado embedded within a larger swath of damaging winds heavily damaged a farmstead and knocked down 20 power poles. One home was severely damaged, and a barn and a garage were destroyed. Losses totaled $25,000.
F0	S of Seymour	Baylor	TX	33.50°N 99.25°W	05:00–?	0.8 miles (1.3 km)	17 yards (16 m)	A brief tornado over open country caused no damage.
F2	W of Kremlin	Garfield	OK	36.55°N 97.87°W	05:30–?	0.1 miles (0.16 km)	10 yards (9.1 m)	A brief, but strong tornado embedded within a much larger swath of 2-inch-diameter (5.1 cm) hail and straight-line winds heavily damaged several farmsteads, leaving behind $2,500 in damage. Hail damage to crops and widespread wind damage also occurred. Grazulis did not list the tornado as an F2 or stronger.

=== May 8 event ===
List of confirmed tornadoes – Monday, May 8, 1961
F#	Location	County / Parish	State	Start coord.	Time (UTC)	Path length	Max. width	Summary
F0	S of Fairfax	Osage	OK	36.55°N 97.87°W	06:30–?	0.1 miles (0.16 km)	10 yards (9.1 m)	A brief tornado caused no damage, although 2 3/4-inch-diameter (7.0 cm) hail did cause extensive damage to nearby areas.
F0	E of Brooksville	Pottawatomie	OK	35.20°N 96.90°W	07:50–?	0.1 miles (0.16 km)	10 yards (9.1 m)	Highway patrol reported a tornado over open country. No damage occurred.
F2	Sportsmen Acres	Mayes	OK	36.25°N 95.25°W	08:00–?	0.1 miles (0.16 km)	10 yards (9.1 m)	Police reported a tornado that damaged a farmstead with losses totaling $2,500. Grazulis did not list the tornado as an F2 or stronger.
F1	SW of Dustin	Hughes	OK	35.25°N 96.07°W	08:30–?	2 miles (3.2 km)	10 yards (9.1 m)	Eight farmsteads were damaged southwest of Dustin with losses totaling $25,000.
F2	Elm Grove	Adair	OK	35.80°N 94.55°W	09:40–?	0.1 miles (0.16 km)	200 yards (180 m)	Buildings were destroyed, moved, and unroofed and trees were uprooted. Losses totaled $25,000.
F2	St. Joe	Searcy	AR	36.03°N 92.80°W	11:00–?	1.5 miles (2.4 km)	10 yards (9.1 m)	A strong tornado moved directly through St. Joe, damaging several homes and unroofing some barns. Losses totaled $25,000. Grazulis did not list the tornado as an F2 or stronger.
F1	Rolla	Hot Spring	AR	34.20°N 92.73°W	14:30–?	0.3 miles (0.48 km)	100 yards (91 m)	Several outbuildings and trees were destroyed, and a house was damaged. A monetary damage value was not given.
F1	Bethel to Mt. Orab to White Oak to Taylorsville	Clermont, Brown, Highland	OH	38.95°N 84.08°W	19:00–?	20 miles (32 km)	100 yards (91 m)	A skipping tornado was seen by the Mt. Orab Chief of Police. Along with the towns listed, the tornado also hit Shiloh and Gath. Trees and roofs were damaged, including one roof that was completely ripped off a house at Mt. Orab. Losses totaled $2,500.
F1	Tuscarawas	Tuscarawas	OH	40.4°N 81.4°W	22:30–?	0.1 miles (0.16 km)	10 yards (9.1 m)	A multi-vortex tornado carved a narrow but damaging 5-mile-long (8.0 km) path directly through Tuscarawas, although it is officially listed as a brief tornado. Small outbuildings, trees, and power lines were damaged, and the path was clearly identifiable in a grove of trees. Losses totaled $25,000.
F2	Finger to Enville to Milledgeville	Chester, McNairy	TN	35.33°N 88.67°W	23:21–23:35	17.2 miles (27.7 km)	300 yards (270 m)	A twin-funneled tornado, each member of which was observed 1/2 mi (0.80 km) apart, developed near Logan Lake and caused major damage as it moved east-northeast through Finger and Enville. Three homes were destroyed, several roofs were damaged, and many trees were uprooted. Losses totaled $250,000.
F1	Pfeiffer	Independence	AR	35.82°N 91.60°W	01:20–?	4.3 miles (6.9 km)	200 yards (180 m)	Considerable damage was inflicted to homes and other buildings with losses totaling $25,000.

=== May 9 event ===
List of confirmed tornadoes – Tuesday, May 9, 1961
F#	Location	County / Parish	State	Start coord.	Time (UTC)	Path length	Max. width	Summary
F2	S of Gabbettville	Troup	GA	32.93°N 85.15°W	08:30–?	0.8 miles (1.3 km)	50 yards (46 m)	A short-lived, but strong tornado "dipped down briefly" northeast of West Point and North West Point. Several buildings were unroofed, a house had its porch blown off, and a number of trees were uprooted. Losses totaled $25,000. Grazulis did not list the tornado as an F2 or stronger.
F1	Warsaw	Coshocton	OH	40.33°N 82°W	22:00–?	0.1 miles (0.16 km)	100 yards (91 m)	Although the main damage was in Coshocton where a movie screen was destroyed and related equipment was damaged as seen by the owner, this brief tornado is officially documented in Warsaw and Warsaw Junction, where barns were demolished. The tornado may have also gone through West Lafayette, where other barns were completely destroyed as well. Losses totaled $2,500. Storm Data also list the tornado as having occurred on May 8 rather than May 9.
F2	Liberty to Bradley to SW of Neversink	Sullivan	NY	41.8°N 74.78°W	00:10–?	6.8 miles (10.9 km)	250 yards (230 m)	A strong tornado skipped east-northeast, heavily damaging multiple vacation resorts in five or six areas, including three of them that were almost completely destroyed. The tornado dissipated over the Neversink Reservoir southwest of Neversink. The tornado caused $2.5 million in damage, and damaged 50 structures, and four (possibly only three) people suffered minor injuries, which were mainly from shock.

=== St. Petersburg, Florida ===
St. Petersburg, Florida
F2 tornado
- on the Fujita scale

Overall effects
- Casualties: None
- Damage: $25,000
- Areas affected: Northern St. Petersburg, Florida

A westward-moving waterspout crossing over Tampa Bay made landfall on the north side of St. Petersburg, causing severe damage to multiple buildings. Two homes were unroofed, including one where the TV antenna was bent and dropped on a car. A high school was also unroofed before the tornado dissipated after tracking only .5 miles (0.80 km) with a maximum width of 50 yards (46 m). Although there were no casualties, the tornado left behind $25,000 in damage.

=== Witmer Lake–Hamilton Lake, Indiana/Edon, Ohio ===
Witmer Lake–Hamilton Lake, Indiana/Edon, Ohio
F3 tornado
- on the Fujita scale

Overall effects
- Casualties: 5 injuries
- Damage: $5.025 million
- Areas affected: Eastern Indiana, Western Ohio

A large, long-tracked F3 tornado–which was likely a tornado family–first touched down on the north shore of Witmer Lake in LaGrange County, Indiana. It moved due east and immediately became strong as it moved into Witmer Manor and Webers Landing. A total of 22 cottages were destroyed or badly damaged while 30 others sustained minor damage. All five injuries from the tornado occurred here before the tornado passed north of Wolcottville. From there, the tornado weakened and skipped along a non-continuous damage path. Scores of homes and barns were damaged as the tornado passed over Blackman Lake, Northern South Milford, Woodland Park, Big Long Lake, Shady Nook, Gravel Beach, Timberhurst, and Taylor Lake. Damages in LaGrange County totaled $2.5 million.

The tornado then crossed into Steuben County, continuing to skip and damage homes and barns as it moved through Turkey Creek and passed north of Hudson and Ashley. As it approached Forest Park north of Hamilton it touched down solidly again and intensified. It then struck Forest Park before crossing Hamilton Lake and striking Oakwood and Circle Park. Two cottages were destroyed, several more were unroofed, and a car with four occupants was thrown in Hamilton Lake, although none of these events resulted in any casualties. It then moved back into rural areas before crossing into Ohio. Damages in Steuben County reached $2.5 million.

In Williams County, Ohio, the tornado turned northeastward, passing through the northwest side of Edon. Damage here was severe as multiple farmhouses and barns were demolished or extensively damaged. After passing Edon, the tornado quickly weakened and dissipated. Losses in Ohio totaled $25,000.

The tornado was on the ground for at least 38 minutes, traveled 33.4 miles (53.8 km), was 800 yards (730 m) and caused $5.025 million in damage. Five people were injured.

=== Hand Valley–Clarkridge, Arkansas/Udall–South Fork, Missouri ===
Hand Valley–Clarkridge, Arkansas/Udall–South Fork, Missouri
F3 tornado
- on the Fujita scale

Overall effects
- Casualties: 10 injuries
- Damage: $3.5 million
- Areas affected: Northern Arkansas, Southern Missouri

This slow-moving, long-tracked, large, multi-vortex F3 tornado first touched down in Hand Valley, Arkansas and moved northeastward over the Crooked Creek and White River. It then passed east of Gassville before moving into Colfax, causing heavy damage. It did more damage as it passed through the west side of Mountain Home before moving back into rural areas. It crossed over Walker Creek, Pigeon Creek, and East Pigeon Creek, before reaching its peak intensity as it tore into Clarkridge. A church, a store, and two homes were destroyed before the tornado moved into Missouri. Throughout Arkansas, the tornado damaged 50 other buildings, injured one, and caused $2.5 million in damage.

The tornado then moved into Missouri and turned northeastward, heavily damaging multiple farm homes and buildings as it crossed over the Norfolk Lake and passed through the south side of Udall. It then moved through mostly rural areas before striking Egypt Grove and Hocomo, causing additional heavy damage, although it was beginning to weaken by this time. The tornado caused some additional damage before dissipating just within the city limits of South Fork. Throughout Missouri, nine people were injured, and damage was estimated at $1 million.

The tornado was on the ground for a least an hour and 15 minutes, tracked 43.8 miles (70.5 km), was 333 yards (304 m) wide, and caused $3.5 million in damage. A total of 10 people were injured. One source list the tornado as being much larger than officially documented with a peak width of 3,000–3,520 yards (2,740–3,220 m) (or 2 miles (3.2 km)) wide. Rainfall from the storm also damaged field crops in Arkansas.

=== Madisonville–Bremen–Moorman–Peth, Kentucky ===
Madisonville–Bremen–Moorman–Peth, Kentucky
F3 tornado
- on the Fujita scale

Overall effects
- Casualties: 3 injuries
- Damage: $15 million
- Areas affected: Northwestern Kentucky

This long-tracked, large F3 tornado touched down just west of Madisonville and immediately reached its peak intensity as it moved east-northeast into downtown. Multiple buildings and homes were extensively damaged, including a three-story brick building that lost its top two floors and two two-story brick buildings that had extensive damage. Trees and power lines were downed, an airplane was destroyed at the Madisonville Municipal Airport in nearby Anton, and cars were damaged by flying debris. All three injuries from this tornado occurred near or in town and losses totaled $2.5 million alone. From Madisonville, the tornado weakened and turned eastward, causing lesser, but still considerable damage as it hit Northern Millport as well as the towns of Bremen Station and Bremen. From there, it began to skip as it hit the town of Moorman, unroofing the Moorman High School gym and destroying a small home. Damage was also observed in Centertown, Beaver Dam, Mt. Pleasant, Arnold, Dogwalk, and Neafus before the tornado finally dissipating in Peth.

The tornado was on the ground for an hour and five minutes, tracked 58 miles (93 km), and was 880 yards (800 m) (one source says 1,320 yards (1,210 m)) wide. Three people were injured, and losses totaled $15 million. Despite the heavy damage, tornado researcher Thomas P. Grazulis gave the tornado an F2 rating. It is also possible that the tornado started in McLean County while never crossing into Grayson County.

== Non-tornadic impacts ==
Numerous reports of large hail and wind damage were confirmed throughout the event. The biggest hailstone was recorded as being 3 inches (7.6 cm) in diameter and was recorded twice in both Texas and Oklahoma as well as once in Kansas. On May 6, the strongest winds were recorded in Tupelo, Mississippi, where 105 mph (169 km/h) gusts destroyed a plane and damaged several others at an airport. On May 5, severe thunderstorm winds in Nebraska City, Nebraska destroyed an airplane hangar and tossed the plane inside into the trees nearby. In addition to the numerous tornadoes that occurred, one waterspout was confirmed to have taken place near Key West, Florida on May 9. Heavy snow of up to 8 inches (20 cm) fell west of the Continental Divide in Montana with Missoula setting a record for the most snow seen in a 24-hour period with 6.5 inches (17 cm).

== See also ==
- List of North American tornadoes and tornado outbreaks
- May 1960 tornado outbreak sequence
- 2021 Western Kentucky tornado – A long-tracked EF4 tornado that affected areas struck by tornadoes in this outbreak sequence
