= Pryse =

Pryse may refer to:

Surname

- Gerald Spencer Pryse (1882–1956), Welsh artist and lithographer
- Tessa Spencer Pryse, his daughter, also a noted artist
- Hugh Pryse (1910–1955), a British film actor
- James Morgan Pryse (1859–1942), author, publisher, and theosophist

Places

- Pryse, Kentucky
