= Howe, Oklahoma =

- Town
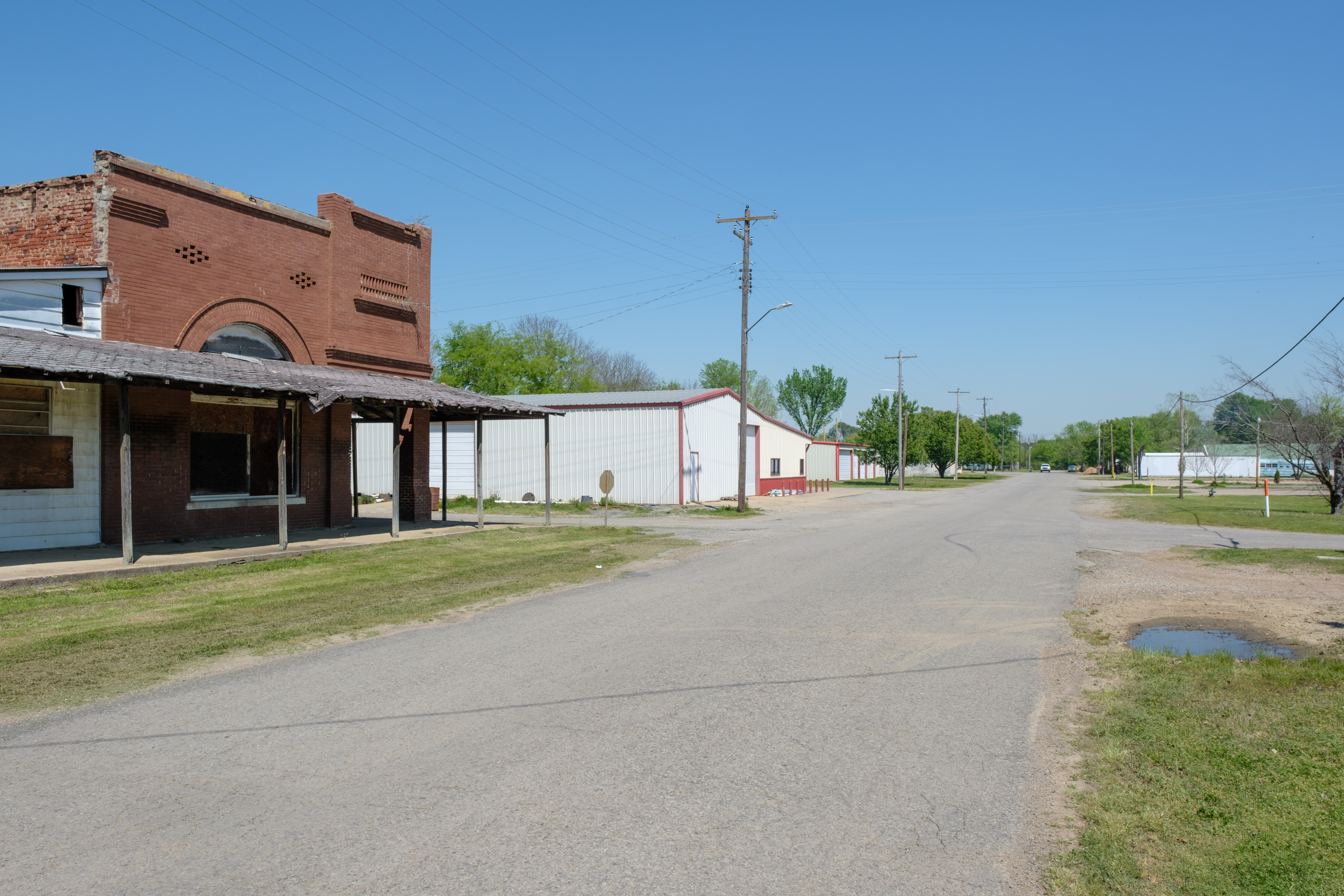

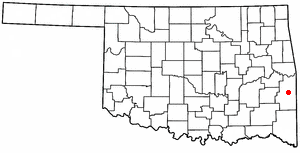
- Location of Howe, Oklahoma
- Coordinates: 34°56′58″N 94°38′25″W
- Country: United States
- State: Oklahoma
- County: Le Flore

Area
  - Total: 1.49 sq mi (3.85 km^{2})
  - Land: 1.49 sq mi (3.85 km^{2})
  - Water: 0 sq mi (0.00 km^{2})
- Elevation: 489 ft (149 m)

Population (2020)
  - Total: 625
  - Density: 420.2/sq mi (162.23/km^{2})
- Time zone: UTC-6 (Central (CST))
  - Summer (DST): UTC-5 (CDT)
- ZIP code: 74940
- Area codes: 539/918
- FIPS code: 40-36150
- GNIS feature ID: 2412772

Howe is a town in Le Flore County, Oklahoma, United States. As of the 2020 census, Howe had a population of 625. The town was once noted for producing coal and coke, but today is chiefly supported by agriculture.

== History ==
This community was originally a Choctaw Nation town named Klondike. After the Kansas City, Pittsburgh and Gulf Railroad laid tracks through it in 1895-6, the residents renamed it for Dr. Herbert M. Howe, a railroad director. A post office opened at Howe, Indian Territory in 1898. The Kansas City Southern Railroad bought the Kansas City, Pittsburgh and Gulf Railroad in 1900.

At the time of its founding, the community was located in the Moshulatubbee District of the Choctaw Nation.

Howe contained 626 residents in 1900, but the number declined to 538 by the 1910 census. It had grown again to 711 in 1920. The population began a long-term decline from 692 in 1930, to 640 in 1940 and to 390 in 1960. The town had its own newspaper, the Howe Herald, four doctors, four drugstores, a bank, two hotels and two cotton gins.

In 1961, an F4 tornado hit Howe and the neighboring village Reichert. The source calls the village Reichter, but the actual name is apparently Reichert. Some accounts even refer to the village as Richards. Sixteen people died, thirteen of them in Howe; fifty-eight were injured, fifty-seven in Howe; and at least fifty homes were destroyed. Despite this, Howe's population trend reversed again. There were 562 residents in 1980, 697 in 2000 and 802 in 2010.

In 2011, on May 24, during a prolific tornado outbreak across Oklahoma and neighbouring states, a mile wide EF2 would touch down roughly 5 miles west of Hodgen, OK. Moving northeast, the tornado would tear through the southeastern side of Howe, dissipating just to the north and east of town. This tornado would cause to injuries or fatalities.

== Geography ==
According to the United States Census Bureau, the town has a total area of 1.5 square miles (3.9 km^{2}), all land. it is 8 miles (13 km) north of Heavener and 7 miles (11 km) south of Poteau.

== Demographics ==
Historical population
Census	Pop.	Note	%±
1900	626		—
1910	538		−14.1%
1920	711		32.2%
1930	692		−2.7%
1940	640		−7.5%
1950	486		−24.1%
1960	390		−19.8%
1970	403		3.3%
1980	562		39.5%
1990	510		−9.3%
2000	697		36.7%
2010	802		15.1%
2020	625		−22.1%
U.S. Decennial Census

=== 2020 census ===
As of the 2020 census, Howe had a population of 625. The median age was 33.1 years. 28.8% of residents were under the age of 18 and 14.1% of residents were 65 years of age or older. For every 100 females there were 87.7 males, and for every 100 females age 18 and over there were 89.4 males age 18 and over.

0.0% of residents lived in urban areas, while 100.0% lived in rural areas.

There were 227 households in Howe, of which 39.2% had children under the age of 18 living in them. Of all households, 43.6% were married-couple households, 18.5% were households with a male householder and no spouse or partner present, and 31.3% were households with a female householder and no spouse or partner present. About 26.0% of all households were made up of individuals and 11.9% had someone living alone who was 65 years of age or older.

There were 259 housing units, of which 12.4% were vacant. The homeowner vacancy rate was 0.0% and the rental vacancy rate was 11.6%.

Racial composition as of the 2020 census
Race	Number	Percent
White	441	70.6%
Black or African American	6	1.0%
American Indian and Alaska Native	89	14.2%
Asian	3	0.5%
Native Hawaiian and Other Pacific Islander	0	0.0%
Some other race	22	3.5%
Two or more races	64	10.2%
Hispanic or Latino (of any race)	38	6.1%

=== 2000 census ===
As of the census of 2000, there were 697 people, 243 households, and 178 families residing in the town. The population density was 449.0 inhabitants per square mile (173.4/km^{2}). There were 287 housing units at an average density of 184.9 per square mile (71.4/km^{2}). The racial makeup of the town was 78.77% White, 0.43% African American, 8.03% Native American, 0.43% Asian, 3.59% from other races, and 8.75% from two or more races. Hispanic or Latino of any race were 4.88% of the population.

There were 243 households, out of which 35.4% had children under the age of 18 living with them, 48.1% were married couples living together, 16.9% had a female householder with no husband present, and 26.7% were non-families. 23.9% of all households were made up of individuals, and 9.5% had someone living alone who was 65 years of age or older. The average household size was 2.73 and the average family size was 3.16.

In the town, the population was spread out, with 29.3% under the age of 18, 12.1% from 18 to 24, 27.1% from 25 to 44, 21.4% from 45 to 64, and 10.2% who were 65 years of age or older. The median age was 32 years. For every 100 females, there were 109.9 males. For every 100 females age 18 and over, there were 104.6 males.

The median income for a household in the town was $25,326, and the median income for a family was $28,194. Males had a median income of $20,724 versus $19,167 for females. The per capita income for the town was $11,636. About 19.4% of families and 26.2% of the population were below the poverty line, including 29.4% of those under age 18 and 30.9% of those age 65 or over.

== Economy ==
At the turn of the 20th century, the town economy was supported by the production of coal, coke, cotton and potatoes. The Lincoln Coal Company operated the local coal mines and also made charcoal briquettes. The Agriculture remained the mainstay of the local economy through the century. The Howe Coal Company contracted to supply Japanese steel mills with coal for 13 years, beginning in 1967.
