= Gerald Spencer Pryse =

British artist

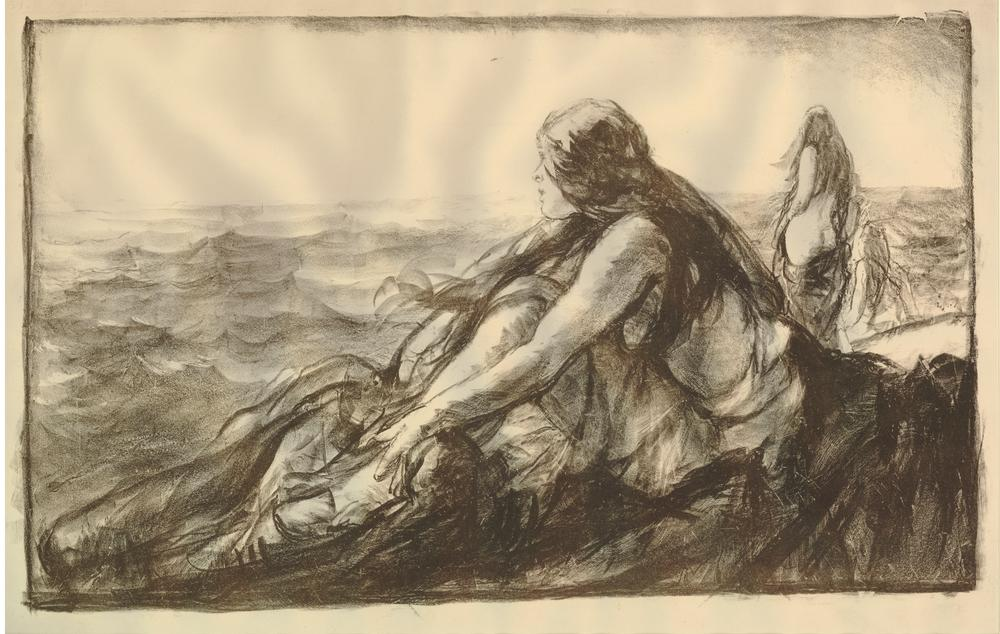
Bathers by the Atlantic, lithograph (trial proof) in the collection of the British Museum

Gerald Spencer Pryse (1882–1956) was a British artist and lithographer.

== Biography ==
Born at Ashton, Pryse studied in London and Paris, and first won a prize at the Venice International Exhibition in 1907. In the same year, he joined the Fabian Society, and helped to found The Neolith, a periodical of literature and the fine arts; the journal was printed in lithography. He was a regular exhibitor at the Senefelder Club, and contributed works to Punch, the Strand Magazine, and The Graphic.

=== First World War ===
During the Great War, Pryse produced a considerable body of lithographic work, some of it in colour under the title Autumn Campaign (1914). This was based in his time in France and Belgium at the beginning of the war when he drove around in a Mercedes carrying lithographic stones in the back. He served as a dispatch rider for the Belgian government and was present at the Siege of Antwerp. The artist wrote a memoir of this time entitled Four Days: an account of a journey in France made between 28 and 31 August 1914, published by John Lane in 1932. Pryse also saw some of the Battle of the Marne and the Aisne but was back in Belgium to record the fall of Ostend and the subsequent retirement along the River Yser. Pryse also worked with the Indian Army in France and several of his lithographs depict scenes of Indian troops.

Later, he served as a captain in the Queen Victoria's Rifles, King's Royal Rifle Corps, and was mentioned in dispatches. His main action was in the Third Battle of Ypres where he won the Military Cross, the 1914 Star, the Order of the Crown of Belgium, the Croix de Guerre.

By the end of 1916, Pryse had made an application to become a war artist, and towards the end of the war, was granted permission to sketch at the front and he was able to record the conditions of trench warfare in numerous water-colour drawings, but many of these were lost in the German offensive of 1918. The remaining drawings were exhibited later in London and were described as having "a freshness and authenticity that were not always apparent in the works of the official war artists." Unfortunately, many of these were destroyed by enemy action during the Second World War. He left the regiment at the end of the war but rejoined it in 1921 when the battalion was stationed at Wormwood Scrubs for three months during a coal strike.

During the war, he also designed a number of posters including several published by Frank Pick for the Underground Electric Railways Company of London in London, as well as for the Labour Party, The British Red Cross, and for the Empire Marketing Board. One of his most famous posters, entitled The Only Road for an Englishman, shows a regiment of British soldiers marching through a ruined town. Pryse was one of the illustrators selected by Percy Bradshaw for inclusion in his The Art of the Illustrator (1917–1918). (Note: The portfolio contained: a brief biography of Pryse, an illustration of Pryse at work in his studio and an explanation of his method of working accompanied by a plate showing an illustration typical of his work and five other plates showing its production stages. Pryse's sepia-wash illustration shows two standing, almost-naked, young women.)

=== Post-War ===
He worked in Hammersmith from 1914 to 1925, but in 1925 travelled to Morocco and observed some of the fighting there against the French. He returned to the country and lived there for some years after 1950. Pryse was commissioned in 1924 to create a series of lithographs for the British Empire Exhibition illustrating the extent and variety of life within the British Empire. His work was part of the art competitions at the 1928 Summer Olympics and the 1932 Summer Olympics. In 1932 he married Muriel Anstace Theodora, daughter of the Rev. Laurence Farrall, and they had three daughters, one of whom, Tessa Spencer Pryse, later a landscape artist, became an art student against her father's wishes. He died at Cranford House, Stourton, Worcestershire on 28 November 1956 aged 74.

== Lithographs in The Autumn Campaign ==
- The Fall of Ostend: La Gare Maritime
- The Fall of Ostend: the digue during the embarkation of the Naval Division for Antwerp
- The Third Cavalry in Ghent, 12 December 1914
- Antwerp Grand Place, September 1914
- Fugitives in Soissons
- The Retreat of the Seventh Division and Third Cavalry on Ypres
- Indians and Motor Buses near Poperinghe
- British cavalry bivouac during the battle on the Aisne
- The Stretcher party in Champagne
