= Tessa Spencer Pryse =

British artist

Tessa Spencer Pryse is a British Impressionist artist based in Wivenhoe, Essex.

The daughter of Gerald Spencer Pryse, a noted Welsh lithographer, Spencer Pryse had an unusual childhood, attending schools in France, rural Wales and Switzerland. She gained a scholarship to Byam Shaw Art School aged 17, where she met her future husband and father of her two children. Based for a time in Scotland, she moved to Wivenhoe in 1991.

Spencer Pryse specialises in oil and watercolour, and her preferred surface is fine oil-primed canvas. The artist's work is notable for its use of light and landscapes. She has commented: "light and delight; those two words with a common root are my inspiration. I paint what I see and search for what I feel to be the essence of a scene in landscape, figure or interior."

Spencer Pryse has received a number of accolades. Most notably she has won the Oppenheim Award, the Davis Slade Award, and in 2006 was presented the Daler Rowney Award for Best Oil Painting, RBA. Additionally, she is a Life Member of the Royal Society of British Artists.
