= Pleasant Valley, Pope County, Arkansas =

Pleasant Valley, Arkansas
- Unincorporated community
- Position in Arkansas
- Coordinates: 35°26′N 93°08′W
- Country: United States
- State: Arkansas
- County: Pope
- Elevation: 525 ft (160 m)
- Time zone: UTC-6 (Central (CST))
  - Summer (DST): UTC-5 (CDT)
- GNIS feature ID: 73136

Pleasant Valley is an unincorporated community in Dover Township, Pope County, Arkansas, United States.
