= Witmer Lake =

- Location within Indiana Location within the United States
- Location: LaGrange County, Indiana
- Coordinates: 41.534°N 85.393°W
- Type: Lake
- Basin countries: United States
- Surface elevation: 896 feet (273 m)

Witmer Lake is a natural lake in LaGrange County, Indiana near Wolcottville. It is part of the Indian Lake Chain of five lakes- Witmer, Westler, Dallas, Hackenberg and Messick Lakes which are connected by the Little Elkhart River. It is the southernmost lake of the five.
