= Dogwalk, Kentucky =

Unincorporated community in Kentucky, United States

Coordinates: 37°24′17″N 86°37′49″W

Dogwalk is an unincorporated community in Ohio County, Kentucky, in the United States.

Dogwalk has been noted for its unusual place name.
