= Pryse, Kentucky =

Unincorporated community in Kentucky, United States

- Unincorporated community
- Location within the state of Kentucky Pryse (the United States)
- Coordinates: 37°39′14″N 83°52′21″W
- Country: United States
- State: Kentucky
- County: Estill
- Elevation: 663 ft (202 m)
- Time zone: UTC-5 (Eastern (EST))
  - Summer (DST): UTC-4 (EDT)
- GNIS feature ID: 514787

Pryse is an unincorporated community located in Estill County, Kentucky, United States. Its post office is closed.
