= Swanwick, Missouri =

Unincorporated community in Missouri, U.S.

Coordinates: 39°18′51″N 94°01′52″W

Swanwick is an unincorporated community in Ray County, in the U.S. state of Missouri and part of the Kansas City metropolitan area.

== History ==
A post office called Swanwick was established in 1872, and remained in operation until 1902. A railroad employee gave the community the name of his wife, Swan Gower.
