= Wolcott, Kansas =

Neighborhood of Kansas City, Kansas

- Location within Kansas Location within the United States
- Coordinates: 39°11′18″N 94°48′05″W
- Country: United States
- State: Kansas
- County: Wyandotte
- Named for: Herbert Wolcott
- Time zone: UTC-6 (CST)
  - Summer (DST): UTC-5 (CDT)

Wolcott is a neighborhood of Kansas City, Kansas, in the United States.

Wolcott was originally called Connor, and under the latter name was platted as a village in 1868. The town was an important shipping point on the Missouri Pacific Railway main line on the Missouri River between Kansas City and Leavenworth. In 1902 the town was renamed in honor of Herbert Wolcott, a railroad official who was the first general manager of the Kansas City Western Electric Railway.

Wolcott had a post office from 1867 to 1944. First known as Connor's Station, in 1889 the post office was renamed to Connor. The post office had its name changed again in 1899 to Wolcott until the post office was discontinued in 1944.
