= South Fork, Missouri =

- Census-designated place
- Location within Missouri Location within the United States
- Coordinates: 36°37′40″N 91°57′45″W
- Country: United States
- State: Missouri
- County: Howell

Area
  - Total: 3.51 sq mi (9.09 km^{2})
  - Land: 3.51 sq mi (9.09 km^{2})
  - Water: 0.0039 sq mi (0.01 km^{2})
- Elevation: 1,119 ft (341 m)

Population (2020)
  - Total: 212
  - Density: 60.4/sq mi (23.33/km^{2})
- Time zone: UTC-6 (Central (CST))
  - Summer (DST): UTC-5 (CDT)
- Area code: 417
- FIPS code: 29-68762
- GNIS feature ID: 2587113

South Fork is an unincorporated community and census-designated place (CDP) in Howell County, Missouri, United States. It is located 10 miles (16 km) southwest of West Plains on U.S. Route 160. As of the 2020 census, South Fork had a population of 212.

A post office called South Fork was established in 1860, and remained in operation until 1960. The community was named after the nearby South Fork of the Spring River.

== Demographics ==
Historical population
Census	Pop.	Note	%±
2020	212		—
U.S. Decennial Census
