= Glendale, Oklahoma =

Unincorporated community in Oklahoma, US

Coordinates: 34°55′23″N 94°42′34″W

Glendale is an unincorporated community in Le Flore County, Oklahoma, United States.

== History ==
The first post office at Glendale opened in 1910.
