= Moorman, Kentucky =

- Unincorporated community
- Location within Kentucky Location within the United States
- Coordinates: 37°22′56″N 87°8′28″W
- Country: United States
- State: Kentucky
- County: Muhlenberg
- Elevation: 440 ft (130 m)
- Time zone: UTC-6 (Central (CST))
  - Summer (DST): UTC-5 (CST)
- GNIS feature ID: 2629655

Moorman is an unincorporated community in Muhlenberg County, Kentucky, United States.
