= Reichert, Oklahoma =

Unincorporated community in Oklahoma, US

Coordinates: 34°51′50″N 94°44′55″W

Reichert is the name of two separate locations approximately one-half mile apart for the unincorporated community in Le Flore County, Oklahoma, United States.

== History ==
A post office was established at Kolb, Indian Territory on February 5, 1892. It was named for Philip Kolb, first postmaster. Its name was changed to Reichert, Indian Territory on May 7, 1892. It was discontinued on February 15, 1927. It was named for William Reichert, first postmaster of the renamed post office.

At the time of its founding, Kolb, later Reichert, was located in Sugar Loaf County, a part of the Apukshunnubbee District of the Choctaw Nation.

William Reichert was a German immigrant who operated a store.
