= List of bicycle brands and manufacturing companies =

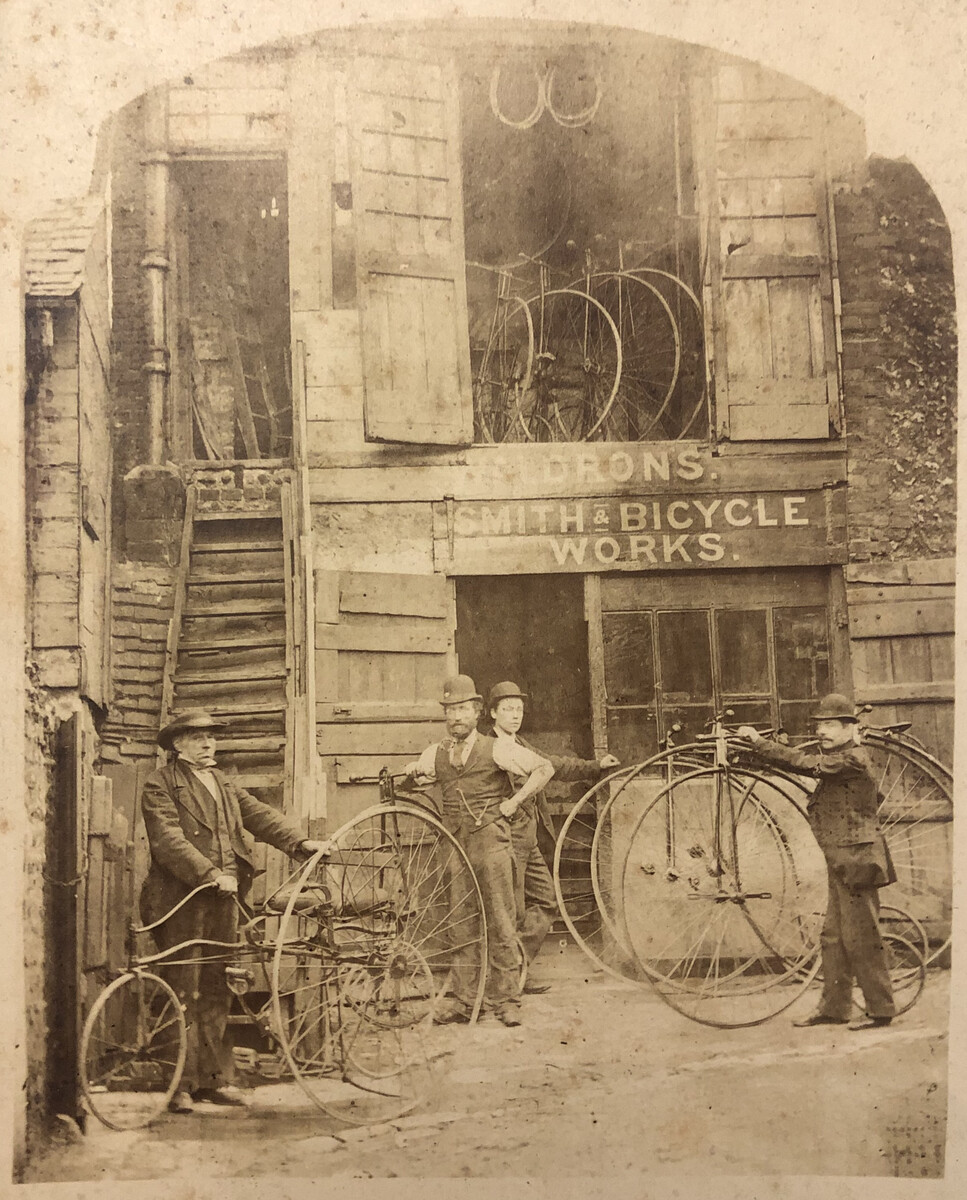
J W Waldron's Smith & Bicycle Works in Brighton, England, ca.1900

Over 100 million bicycles are made each year, the top three manufacturing countries being China, India and Taiwan. In 2025, the global market size was an estimated $116 billion.

Many bicycle brands do not manufacture their own product, but rather import and re-brand bikes manufactured by others, sometimes designing the bike, specifying the equipment, and providing quality control. There are also brands that have, at different times, been manufacturers as well as re-branders: a company with manufacturing capability may market models made by other (overseas) factories, while simultaneously manufacturing bicycles in-house, for example, high-end models.

== International manufacturers ==
Only brands or manufacturers that are notable as a bicycle brand should be included. If no page exists for the company or brand, then the page to be linked to should be created first or a reference provided as to its notability or the entry will probably be removed.

Bicycle manufacturers are in many cases members of "Groups", i.e. they have several product names – so-called "brands". Examples include the following:

- Accell in Heerenveen, Netherlands
- Cycleurope based in Stockholm, Sweden
- Derby Cycle in Cloppenburg, Germany
- Dorel Sports, a division of the Dutch Pon Holdings

== 0—9 ==
- 3T Cycling – Italy

== A ==
- A-bike – UK
- Abici – Italy (defunct)
- Adler – Germany (defunct)
- AIST – Belarus
- ALAN – Italy
- Al Carter – UK (defunct)
- Alcyon – France (defunct)
- Alldays & Onions – UK (defunct)
- American Bicycle Company – USA (defunct)
- American Bicycle Group – USA, owns Litespeed, Quintana Roo, and Obed Bikes
- American Eagle – USA (defunct, original name of Nishiki)
- American Machine and Foundry – USA (widely known as AMF) (defunct), formerly owned Roadmaster.
- American Star Bicycle – USA (defunct) manufactured by the H. B. Smith Machine Company
- Aprilia – Italy (Started as a bicycle manufacturing unit at Noale, Italy but now manufactures Scooters and Motorcycles)
- Argon 18 – Canada
- Ariel – England (defunct)
- Atala – Italy
- Author – Czech Republic
- Avanti – New Zealand

== B ==
- Baltik vairas – Lithuania
- Bacchetta – USA (Sold to Bent Up Cycles)
- Basso_Bikes – Italy
- Batavus – Netherlands
- Battaglin – Italy
- Berlin & Racycle Manufacturing Company – Canada (defunct)
- BH – Spain
- Bianchi – Italy
- Bickerton – UK (folding bikes)
- Bike Friday – USA (Green Gear Cycling Co.) (folding bikes)
- Bilenky – USA
- Biomega – Denmark
- Birdy – Germany (folding bikes)
- BMC – Switzerland
- Boardman Bikes – UK
- Bohemian Bicycles – USA
- Bontrager – USA (bought by Trek and converted into a component brand)
- Bootie – UK
- Bottecchia – Italy
- Bradbury – UK (defunct)
- Brasil & Movimento – Brazil (Branded as Sundown)
- Breezer - US (bought by Advanced Sports International)
- Brennabor – Germany (defunct)
- Bridgestone – Japan
- British Eagle – UK
- Brodie Bicycles – Canada
- Brompton Bicycle – UK (folding bikes)
- Brunswick – USA, formerly owned Roadmaster
- BSA – UK, no longer builds bicycles, TI of India builds BSA branded bikes.
- B’Twin – France
- Burley Design – USA (no longer make bicycles)

== C ==
- Calcott Brothers – UK (defunct)
- Calfee Design – USA
- Caloi – Brazil
- Campion Cycle Company – UK
- Cannondale – an American division of Dorel Sports
- Canyon bicycles – Germany
- Catrike – USA (Recumbent trikes)
- CCM – Canada
- Centurion – Germany (former Japan)
- Cervélo – Canada
- Chappelli Cycles - Australia
- Chater-Lea – UK
- Chicago Bicycle Company – USA (defunct)
- Cilo – Switzerland
- Ciombola - Australia
- Cinelli – Italy
- Citizen Bike – USA (folding bikes)
- Clark-Kent – USA (defunct)
- Claud Butler – UK
- Clément – France (defunct)
- Co-Motion Cycles – USA
- Coker – USA
- Colnago – Italy
- Columbia Bicycles – USA
- Corima – France
- Cortina Cycles – USA
- Coventry-Eagle- UK (defunct – see Falcon Cycles)
- Cruzbike – USA, recumbent
- Cube – Germany
- Currys – UK, no longer makes bicycles
- Cycle Force Group – USA
- Cycles Devinci – Canada
- Cycleuropa Group – Sweden, manufactures such brands as: Bianchi, Crescent, DBS, Everton, Gitane, Kildemoes, Legnano, Micmo, Monark, Puch, Spectra, and Cyclepro.
- Cyfac – France

== D ==
- Dahon – USA / China
- Dawes Cycles – UK
- Decauville, France (defunct)
- Defiance Cycle Company
- Demorest – USA (restructured as Lycoming Foundry and Machine Company and discontinued bicycle manufacturing)
- Den Beste Sykkel Better known as DBS – Norway
- Derby Cycle – Germany, owns Kalkhoff, Focus, Nishiki, Rixe, Raleigh and Univega
- De Rosa – Italy
- Detroit Bikes – USA
- Cycles Devinci – Canada (not to be confused with daVinci Designs of USA, who make tandems.)
- Di Blasi Industriale – Italy
- Diamant – Norway. Unrelated brand of same name from Germany, owned by Trek
- Diamondback Bicycles – USA
- Dolan Bikes – UK
- Dorel Sports – Canada, owns Pacific Cycle and markets under brand names including Cannondale, Iron Horse, Schwinn, Mongoose, Roadmaster, and GT.
- Dunelt – UK (defunct)
- Duranta (bicycle) – Bangladesh
- Dynacraft – USA, owns Magna and Next

== E ==
- Eagle Bicycle Manufacturing Company – USA (defunct)
- Eddy Merckx Cycles – Belgium
- Electra Bicycle Company – USA (Owned by Trek Bicycle Company)
- Ellis Briggs – UK
- Ellsworth Handcrafted Bicycles – USA
- Emilio Bozzi – Italy (acquired by Bianchi)
- Ērenpreiss Bicycles – Latvia
- Excelsior – UK (defunct)

== F ==
- Factor Bikes – UK
- Falcon Cycles – UK
- Fat City Cycles – USA (defunct)
- Favorit – Czechoslovakia, Czech Republic
- Felt – USA
- Flying Pigeon – China
- Flying Scot – Scotland
- Focus Bikes – Germany. Part of Derby Cycle
- Cycles Follis – France (defunct)
- Folmer & Schwing – USA (defunct)
- Fondriest – Italy
- Fram – Sweden (defunct)
- Freddie Grubb – UK
- Fuji Bikes – USA (owned by Advanced Sports International)
- Fyxation – USA

== G ==
- Gazelle – Netherlands
- Gendron Bicycles – USA
- Genesis – UK
- Gepida – Hungary
- Ghost – Germany ((acquired by Accell, made in Taiwan))
- Giant Manufacturing – Taiwan Manufacturers its own bikes and many other brands
- Gimson – Spain (defunct)
- Gitane – France
- Gladiator Cycle Company – France (defunct)
- Gnome et Rhône – France (defunct)
- Gocycle – UK
- Gormully & Jeffery – USA (defunct)
- Gräf & Stift – Austria (defunct)
- GT Bicycles – American brand now owned by Dorel Sports
- Guerciotti – Italy
- Gustavs Ērenpreis Bicycle Factory – Latvia (defunct)
- Gunnar – USA

== H ==
- Halfords – UK
- Harley-Davidson – USA, 1917–1923.
- Haro Bikes – USA, owns the Masi brand.
- Harry Quinn – UK (defunct)
- Hase bikes – Germany
- Heinkel – Germany (defunct)
- Helkama – Finland
- Henley Bicycle Works – USA (defunct)
- Hercules – UK (defunct)
- Hercules – Germany
- Hero Cycles Ltd – India – owning brands such as Hero, Hawk, Firefox and Roma
- René Herse – France
- Hetchins – UK
- Hillman – UK (defunct)
- Hoffman BMX Bikes
- Hoffmann – Germany (defunct)
- Holdsworth – UK
- Huffy – USA
- Humber – UK part of Raleigh
- Hurtu – France (defunct)
- Husqvarna – Sweden (no longer a bicycle manufacturer)
- Hutch BMX BMX Bicycle manufacturer USA

== I ==
- Ibis – USA
- Ideal Bikes – Greece
- Indian – USA (bought by Polaris)
- IFA – East Germany (defunct)
- Independent Fabrication – USA
- Inspired Cycle Engineering (ICE) – UK (recumbent trikes)
- Iride – Italy
- Iron Horse Bicycles – American brand now owned by Dorel Sports
- Islabikes – UK
- Italvega – USA (defunct) Precursor to Univega
- Ivel Cycle Works – UK (defunct)
- Iver Johnson – USA (defunct)
- Iverson – USA (defunct)

== J ==
- Jan Janssen – The Netherlands
- JMC Bicycles – USA (defunct)
- Jamis Bicycles- USA
- Java bikes- designed from France made in china

== K ==
- Kalkhoff – Germany
- Kangaroo – UK
- Karbon Kinetics Limited – UK
- K2 Sports – USA
- Kent – USA
- Kestrel USA – USA (owned by Advanced Sports International)
- Kettler – Germany
- KHS – Taiwan A Manufacturer of its own bikes plus many other brands
- Kia – ROK, no longer produces bicycles
- Kinesis Industry – Taiwan and USA, Kenesis produces its own bikes as well as brands manufactured by Kinesis include Diamondback Bicycles, Felt Bicycles, GT Bicycles, Schwinn, Jamis, K2, Raleigh, Trek, and Kona
- Klein – USA (Discontinued brand owned by Trek)
- KOGA (formerly Koga Miyata) – The Netherlands
- Kogswell Cycles – USA
- Kona – USA&Canada
- Kronan – Sweden
- Kross – Poland
- KTM – Austria
- Kuota – Italy
- Kuwahara – Japan (Okinawa)

== L ==
- Laurin & Klement – Austria-Hungary/Czech republic
- Lapierre – France
- LeMond – USA (Discontinued brand owned by Trek)
- Alexander Leutner & Co. — Russia (defunct)
- Lightning Cycle Dynamics – USA (recumbent bicycles)
- Litespeed – USA
- Look – France
- Louison Bobet – France (defunct)
- Lotus, USA (defunct)

== M ==
• Mobetta Bike Co - USA

- Magna – USA
- Malvern Star – Australia
- Marin Bikes – USA
- Masi Bicycles – USA
- Matchless – UK (defunct)
- Matra – France
- Meghna Group - Bangladesh
- Melon Bicycles – USA
- Mercian Cycles – UK
- Merida Bikes – Taiwan
- Merlin – USA
- Milwaukee Bicycle Co. – USA
- Minerva – Belgium (defunct)
- Miyata – Japan
- Mochet – France (defunct)
- Monark – Sweden/Brazil/Peru
- Mondia – Switzerland
- Mongoose – American brand now owned by Dorel Sports
- Montague – USA
- Moots Cycles – CO, USA
- Motobécane – France
- Moulton – UK
- Mountain Equipment Co-op – Canada
- Murray – USA (defunct)
- Muddy Fox – UK (other brand: Silver Fox)

== N ==
- Nagasawa – Japan
- National – Japan, precursor to Panasonic
- Neil Pryde – Hong Kong
- Neobike – Taiwan
- NEXT – USA
- Nishiki – USA and Europe
- Norco – Canada
- Norman Cycles – UK (defunct)
- Novara – USA
- NSU – Germany
- Nymanbolagen – Sweden

== O ==
- Olmo – Italy
- Opel – Germany (no longer makes bicycles)
- Orbea – Spain
- Órbita – Portugal
- Orient Bikes – Greece
- Overman Wheel Company – USA (defunct)
- Orro - England, UK

== P ==
- Pacific Cycle – USA, was acquired by Dorel Sports in 2004. Owns GT, Mongoose, Murray, Roadmaster, and Schwinn brands
- Pacific Cycles – Pacific Cycles is a Taiwan bicycle manufacturing company based in Hsin Wu, Taoyuan, Taiwan.
- Panasonic – Japan, successor to National
- Pashley Cycles – UK
- Pedersen bicycle – UK
- Pegas – RO
- Peugeot – France
- Phillips Cycles – UK
- Phoenix – China
- Pierce Cycle Company – USA (defunct)
- Pinarello – Italy
- Planet X Bikes – UK, On-One, Titus, Planet X
- Pocket Bicycles – USA
- Pogliaghi – Italy
- Polygon Bikes – Indonesia
- Pope Manufacturing Company – USA (defunct)
- Premier – UK (defunct)
- Priority Bicycles - USA
- Prophete – Germany
- Puch – Austria

== Q ==
- Quadrant Cycle Company – UK (defunct)
- Quality Bicycle Products – USA and Taiwan, owns Salsa Cycles and Surly Bikes.
- Quintana Roo – USA

== R ==
- R+E Cycles – USA also known as Rodriguez Bicycles
- Radio Flyer – USA
- Rabasa Cycles – Spain
- Raleigh – UK. Part of Derby Cycle
- Rambler – USA (defunct), made by Gormully & Jeffery
- Rans Designs – USA
- Razor – USA
- Redline bicycles – USA
- Rhoades Car – USA (quadracycles)
- Ribble Cycles - UK
- Ridgeback – UK
- Ridley – Belgium
- Riese und Müller – Germany
- RIH – Netherlands
- Riley Cycle Company – UK (defunct)
- Rivendell Bicycle Works – USA
- Roadmaster – American brand now owned by Dorel Sports
- Roberts Cycles – UK
- Robin Hood – UK
- Rocky Mountain Bicycles – Canada
- ROMET Bike Factory – Poland
- ROSE Bikes – Germany
- Ross – USA
- Rover Company – UK
- Rowbike – USA
- Rudge-Whitworth – UK

== S ==
- Salcano (bicycle) – Turkey
- Samchuly – Korea
- Santa Cruz Bikes – (owed by Pon Industries Europe)
- Santana Cycles – USA (only makes tandem bicycles)
- Saracen Cycles – UK
- Maskinfabriks-aktiebolaget Scania – Sweden
- Schwinn Bicycle Company – American brand now owned by Dorel Sports
- SCOTT Sports – Switzerland
- SE Racing now SE Bikes PK Ripper and Floval Flyer maker, USA
- Serotta – USA
- Seven Cycles – USA
- Shelby Cycle Company – USA (defunct)
- Shimano – Japan
- Simpel – Switzerland
- Simson – Germany (acquired by Industrieverband Fahrzeugbau, now defunct)
- Sinclair Research – UK
- Singer – UK (defunct)
- Softride- USA
- Sohrab – Pakistan
- Solé Bicycle Co. – USA
- Solex – France (defunct)
- Solifer – Finland
- SOMA Fabrications – USA
- Somec – Italy
- Spacelander Bicycle – United Kingdom, later United States (defunct)
- Spalding – USA (sold/distributed bicycles during the latter part of the 19th Century)
- Sparta B.V. – Netherlands
- Specialized – USA Designer only
- Speedwell bicycles – Australia (defunct)
- Star Cycle Company – UK
- Stearns – USA (defunct)
- Stelber Cycle Corp – USA
- Stella – France
- Sterling Bicycle Co. – USA
- Steyr – Austria (defunct)
- Strida – UK
- Sun Cycle & Fittings Co. – UK (defunct)
- Sunbeam – UK (defunct)
- Surly Bikes – USA
- Suzuki – Japan
- Swift Folder – USA
- Swing Bike – USA (defunct)
- Škoda – Czech republic

== T ==
- Tern – Taiwan
- TerraTrike – USA (recumbent tadpole trikes)
- Terrot – France (defunct)
- Thomas – USA (defunct)
- Time – France
- Titus – USA (defunct, since absorbed into Planet X Bikes)
- Torker – USA
- Trek Bicycle Corporation – USA, also Klein Bikes, LeMond Racing Cycles (both discontinued) and Gary Fisher Bikes
- Trident Trikes – USA (recumbent trikes)
- Trinx – China, Taiwan, Russia, Iran, Philippines
- Triumph Cycle – UK (Owned by Raleigh Bicycle Company)
- Triumph (TWN) – Germany
- Tube Investments – UK (owned British Cycle Corporation) No longer manufacturers bicycles
- Tunturi – Finland
- Turner Suspension Bicycles – USA

== U ==
- Univega – US. Part of Derby Cycle
- Urago – France (defunct)

== V ==
- Van Dessel Sports – USA
- VanMoof – Netherlands
- Velocite Bikes – Taiwan
- Velomotors – Russia
- VéloSoleX – France (Velosolex America markets the VELOSOLEX worldwide.)
- Victoria – Germany
- Villiger – Switzerland, part of Trek
- Villy Customs – USA
- Vindec – UK
- VinFast – Vietnam
- Vitus – France
- Volae – USA, recumbent bicycles
- Volagi – USA

== W ==
- Wanderer – Germany (defunct)
- Waverley Cycles Manufactured by Indiana Bicycle Company, USA
- Waterford Precision Cycles – USA
- Western Wheel Works Indiana USA, built the Crescent brand
- Whippet – UK
- Wilderness Trail Bikes – USA
- Wilier Triestina – Italy
- Witcomb Cycles – UK
- Wittson Custom Ti Cycles – Lithuania
- Worksman Cycles – USA, also imports Atlantic Coast Cruiser brand
- Wright Cycle Company – USA (defunct)
- Whyte – UK

== X ==
- Xootr – USA

== Y ==
- Yamaguchi Bicycles – USA
- Yamaha – Japan
- Yeti Cycles – USA
- YT Industries – German

== Z ==
- Zigo – USA

== See also ==
- Head badges
- List of bicycle part manufacturers
- List of BMX bicycle manufacturers
- List of electric bicycle brands and manufacturers
- List of Australian bicycle brands and manufacturers
- List of Japanese bicycle brands and manufacturers
- Outline of cycling
