= Volae =

- Product type: Recumbent bicycle
- Produced by: Volae
- Introduced: 2003

Volae is a brand of recumbent bicycles manufactured by Volae which is based in Stevens Point, Wisconsin, United States. Rolf Garthus founded the company in 2003. All models are built in the United States - a range of steel-framed bicycles are built by Waterford Precision Cycles, of Waterford Wisconsin, and the carbon fiber frames are built by Calfee Design in La Selva Beach California. Purchasing is done through the Hostel Shoppe in Stevens Point.

== Models ==
- Venture (Tandem)
- Venture Pro (Tandem)
- Team Carbon
- Club Carbon
- Expedition (dual 26" wheels)
- Expedition Pro (dual 26" wheels)
- Sport (dual 26" wheels)
- Tour (26"/20" wheels)
- Century (26"/20" wheels)
- Voyageur ES (26"/20" wheels, or dual 26" wheels), comes apart for easy transport

== See also ==
- List of bicycle manufacturers
