= Samchuly =

South Korean bicycle company

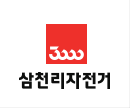
- Native name: 三千里
- Company type: Public
- Industry: Bicycle
- Founded: 1944; 82 years ago
- Headquarters: Gangnam, South Korea
- Key people: Kim Seok-Hwan, CEO
- Number of employees: 190 (as of 2011)
- Website: samchuly.co.kr

Samchuly (Korean: 三千里, lit. 'Three thousand li') is a leading bicycle company, and the largest bicycle manufacturer and retailer in South Korea. Headquartered in Seoul, South Korea, Samchuly currently operates a manufacturing facility in Uiwang, with a production capacity of 300,000 bicycles per year. The company's offerings consist of folding bikes, women's bikes, children's bikes, racing bikes, mountain bikes and special bikes under brand names such as Andre Kim, Appalanchia, Cello, KENIA, HOUND, NEXT and Lespo.

Samchuly employs 190 employees, while having over 3000 individual retail stores in all areas throughout South Korea. Samchuly bicycles are also sold in countries such as the United States, Japan, and in various countries in Europe. Samchuly bicycles have been used in international competitions such as the 1988 Olympics and the 2002 FIFA World Cup.

Samchuly is known to have top South Korean celebrities represent the brand as spokespeople such as Son Ji Chang, Seo Taiji, Fin.K.L, and Han Hyo-joo.

The CEO is Kim Seok Hwan, who is the grandson of Kim Chul-Ho and the founder of Kia Motors.

== Etymology ==
The corporate logo's contemporary shape and image in red, supposedly represents development and stability within the company. With Samchuly's traditional symbol of "3000", it allegedly reflects Samchuly's purported long-term management strategy aimed at being the front-runner in leisure sports in the year 2000.

== History ==
=== 1944–1964 ===
Kim Chul-Ho, founder of Kia Motors, founded Samchuly Bicycle in December 1944. As the first company to produce bicycles in South Korea, this was in effect, the beginning of the bicycle industry in South Korea. By January 1945, Samchuly was producing many components of the bicycle, including the chain, hub, crank, pedals, and other parts in its own factory. In April 1952, during the Korean War, Samchuly started manufacturing complete bicycles for the first time. This was 85 years after Ernest Michaux started mass-producing bicycles in France. Samchuly was the first to manufacture and sell a complete bicycle in South Korea.

=== 1965–1984 ===
As the South Korean economy struggled to grow, Samchuly decided to export bicycles to the United States and shipped their first set of bicycles in 1965. President Park Chung-Hee visited Samchuly's factory at Sihung and encouraged Samchuly to help South Korea industrialize in the 1970s. Exports to the United States grew very rapidly in the 1970s, with annual exports averaging 100,000 bicycles. By the 1980s, annual exports averaged 300,000 bicycles.

=== 1985–2007 ===
In 1985, South Korea established a designated manufacturing complex at Taegu to build bicycles and component parts. This complex planned to establish a manufacturing capacity of 3 million bicycles- one million for domestic consumption and two million for exports. With the support of the government, in 1987, Samchuly was able to manufacture 1 million bicycles from its factory at Yangsan. The following year, the year of the Seoul Olympics, Samchuly exported over 2 million bicycles to the United States alone.

In 1991, Samchuly began producing the popular Lespo models. The firm received ISO 9001 certification in 1995.

=== 2008–present ===
By 2008, the South Korean government started to promote environmentally friendly, green policies. A plan to build over 5,200 km of new bicycle paths and roads was released. As well, the Four Major Rivers Project was announced and as a result, plans to build bicycle paths connecting the Han River in Seoul; the Nakdong River in the Gyeongsang provinces, the Geum River in the Chungcheong and North Jeolla regions, and the Yeongsan River in South Jeolla, were announced. In response to government supported policies, Samchuly reviewed the possibility of manufacturing higher end bicycles in South Korea.

In July 2009, Samchuly broke ground for its Uiwang factory, which was built for the purpose of manufacturing high-end bicycles such as Cello Sports, a subsidiary brand of Samchuly. The production capacity of the Uiwang factory is 300,000 bicycles. The Uiwang factory's competitive advantage is not in its component parts, but rather in its capacity to tailor make bicycles to order. This factory has the capacity to tailor make bicycles to the specific physical requirements of the customer and customizing bicycles depending on various needs.

== Subsidiary brands of Samchuly ==
=== Lespo ===
Lespo is the leading brand of Samchuly that carries bicycles for women, mountain bikes, and bicycles for professional cyclists as well.

=== Appalanchia ===
Appalanchia is a brand of racing bikes and some of fixed gear bikes.

=== NEXT ===
The Next brand is a brand with mass distribution, it carries standard bicycles such as entry level bicycles and bicycles for women.

=== Hound ===
The Hound brand targets younger individuals.

== See also ==
- List of South Korean companies
- List of bicycle manufacturers
- Economy of South Korea
