= Author (disambiguation) =

An author is a person who created (or is creating) a written work such as a book, poem, or article.

Author may also refer to:

- Author (bicycles), a Czech brand of bicycles and sporting goods
- Author citation (botany)
- Author citation (zoology)
- Author (music), the creator of a piece of music
- Authors (card game)
- Writer
