= LeMond Racing Cycles =

American bicycle company

early head badge

later head badge

Silver Edition head badge

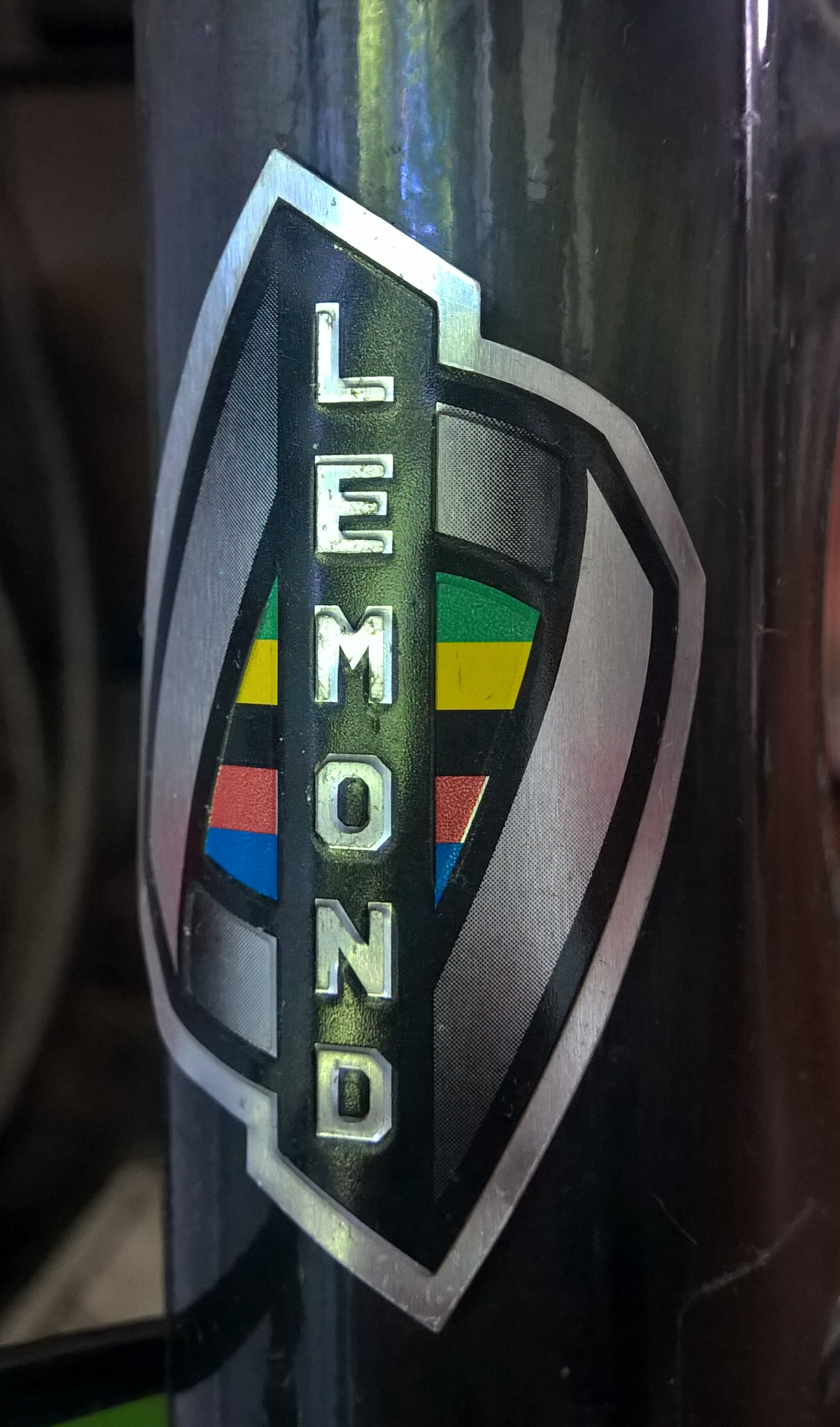
UCI Rainbow head badge 1997

LeMond Racing Cycles is a bicycle company founded by Greg LeMond, who won the Tour de France three times.

LeMond initially offered bicycle frames with a geometry based on the racing bikes he used in competition, with a longer top tube and wheelbase in an otherwise traditional lightweight steel frame. This was to stretch out the rider on the bicycle, with the intent of both lowering the frontal area presented to the wind, and optimizing power and stability.

From 1995 until February 2010 LeMond did not manufacture bicycles, instead licensing the brand name to Trek. Trek believed that the cachet of the name and models offering a longer top tube than Trek's frame geometries would increase sales . In September 2013, LeMond partnered with Time to produce a limited run of 300 frames to commemorate his three Tour victories in 1986, 1989, and 1990. In August 2014, Greg LeMond launched the Washoe, a Reynolds 853 steel bike manufactured in the United States.

== Greg LeMond ==
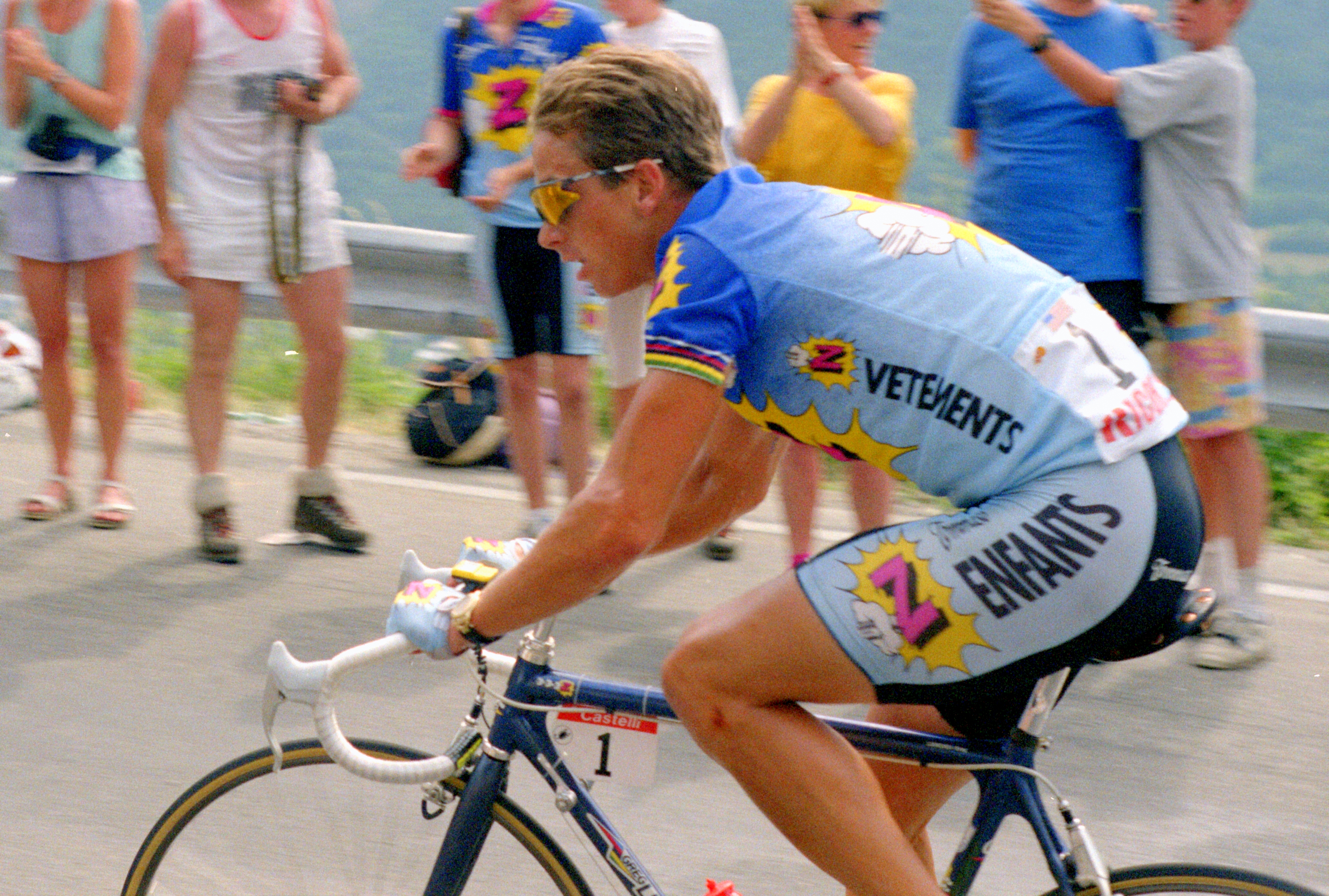
LeMond on carbon fiber in the 1991 Tour

Greg LeMond was a pioneer in the use of carbon fiber bicycle frames in European professional road cycling, and his Tour de France win in 1986 ahead of Bernard Hinault was the first for carbon. LeMond rode a "Bernard Hinault" Signature Model Look prototype that year. LeMond also won the 1989 Tour and World's, and his final Tour de France in 1990 on carbon fiber frames, which had begun to feature "Greg LeMond" branding.

== Company founding ==
In 1986, LeMond founded LeMond Bicycles to develop machines for himself that would also be marketed and sold to the public. In 1990, searching for an equipment edge for Team Z at the 1991 Tour de France, LeMond concluded an exclusive licensing agreement between his company and Carbonframes, Inc., to access the latter's advanced composites technology. While LeMond briefly led the 1991 Tour while riding his Carbonframes-produced "Greg LeMond" bicycle, the company faltered, something LeMond blamed on "undercapitalization" and poor management by his father, although Carbonframes and LeMond Cycles "parted amiably two years later." In 1995, LeMond reached a licensing agreement with Trek, according to which the Wisconsin-based company would manufacture and distribute bicycles designed with LeMond that would be sold under the "LeMond Bicycles" brand. LeMond would later claim that going into business with Trek "destroyed" his relationship with his father.

In 2001 the Trek deal proved painful for LeMond as he was forced by John Burke, the head of Trek, to apologize for the negative comments about Michele Ferrari, doping, and Lance Armstrong, who was by then a very important marketing force for Trek. LeMond's contract with Trek had a clause prohibiting LeMond from doing anything that would damage Trek. Burke reminded LeMond of this commitment, and strongly argued that LeMond publicly retract his statements. LeMond read a formal apology to Armstrong.

In March 2008 LeMond Cycling Inc filed a complaint against Trek for breach of contract, claiming that they had not made a "best efforts" attempt to sell his bicycles, as well as describing the attempts to 'silence' him about doping, including incidents in 2001 and 2004. His complaint included statistics detailing slow sales in some markets, including the fact that between September 2001 and June 2007, Trek only sold $10,393 worth of LeMond bikes in France, a country in which LeMond remains both famous and popular.

In April 2008 Trek countersued and stopped building bikes under the LeMond brand. In connection with that announcement Trek also gave a short timeline of the Trek-Greg LeMond association. These lawsuits were settled in February 2010. Although the details of the settlement were confidential, it involved a $200,000 donation by Trek to 1in6.org, a charity with which LeMond is affiliated.

In 2013 Greg Lemond announced three all-new Lemond models to be distributed through Time Sports USA. The models commemorate Lemond's Tour victories with graphics and model numbers that recall the teams and the years and of his victories.

== Conflicts with Armstrong and Trek ==
According to the United States Anti-Doping Agency 2012 doping report, based on affidavits by Frankie and Betsy Andreu, in 2001 Lance Armstrong reacted to LeMond's negative comments about Doctor Michele Ferrari and Armstrong by saying he would "take him down" and that he could call Trek's owner and "shut him up".

According to a 2012 Outside story by Armstrong assistant Mike Anderson, Armstrong said he would “put LeMond out of business” over comments about him and Ferrari.

In March 2008, LeMond Cycling Inc prepared a lawsuit against Trek, accusing them of bowing to pressure from "third parties" to "wind down" his brand through lack of distribution and promotion, especially in the European market. The complaint also says that "Since 2001, Trek has systematically sought to silence Mr. LeMond's right to make comments that constitute an informed and honest opinion on matters of legitimate public interest - the problems associated with the use of performance enhancing substances". For example,

- In 2001, shortly after LeMond made negative comments about doping doctor Michele Ferrari and Lance Armstrong, the complaint alleges that "Trek contacted Mr. LeMond to notify him that Mr. LeMond's comments in the article upset Mr. Armstrong".
- The complaint states that in 2001 John Burke of Trek contacted LeMond and "wanted Mr LeMond to issue a statement that had been drafted for him" regarding the Armstrong/Ferrari comments, and that if a suitable press release was not made, "Mr. Armstrong would sever his relationship with Trek and Mr. LeMond's relationship with Trek would suffer."
- LeMond "acquiesced to allow the release of a public statement that restated his views regarding Dr. Ferrari" but the statement was printed in USA Today as though it were an interview.
- In 2004 after LeMond's interview with a French newspaper where he made negative comments about Armstrong, Trek claimed that LeMond was in breach of the "Moral turpitude" section of their business agreement.
- LeMond was disinvited from the 2006 Trek dealer show, and not invited to the 2007 dealer show nor the 2007 Trek 100 charity ride.

LeMond talked about some of these issues in a 2012 interview with the Irish radio program NewsTalk as well.

Trek responded to the lawsuit in 2008 by suing to sever business ties with LeMond. Trek's press release said that "LeMond’s suit was characterized by Burke as containing false and irresponsible allegations ". Burke also said "for years, Greg LeMond has done and said things that have damaged the LeMond brand and the Trek brand as a whole".... "His actions are inconsistent with our values—values we believe in and live everyday. And after years of trying to make it work, we are done."

== Models ==
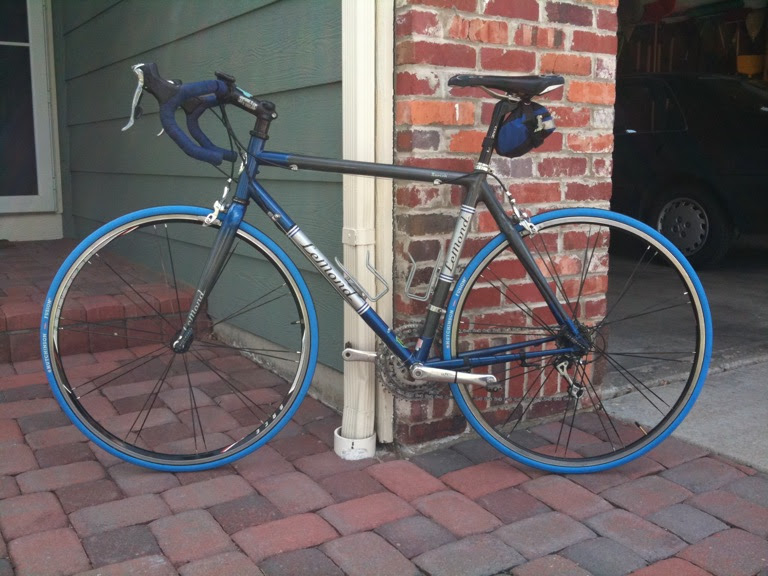
2004 Lemond Zurich (in blue)

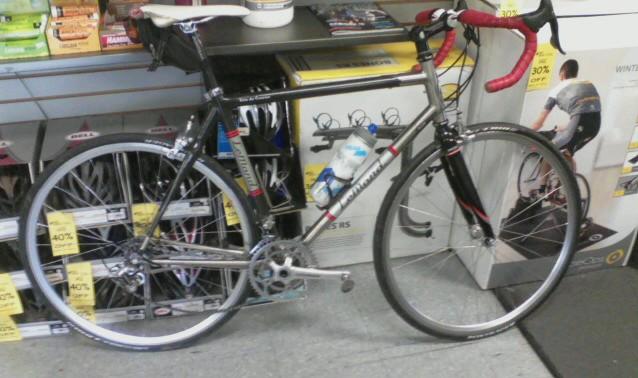
LeMond Tete de Course road bike

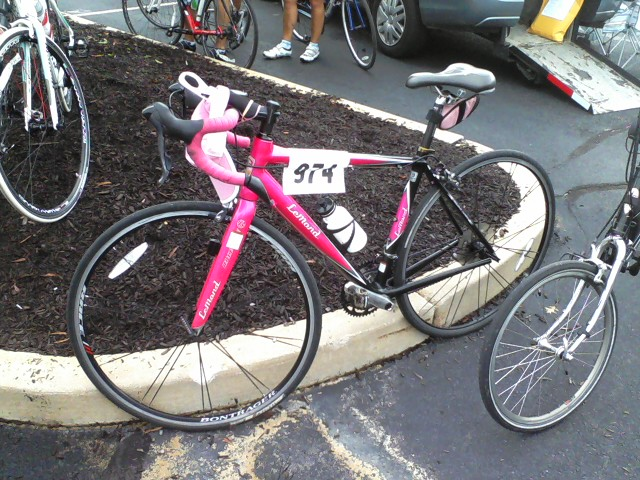
Lemond Pink and Black road bike during the 2011 MS150:City to Shore

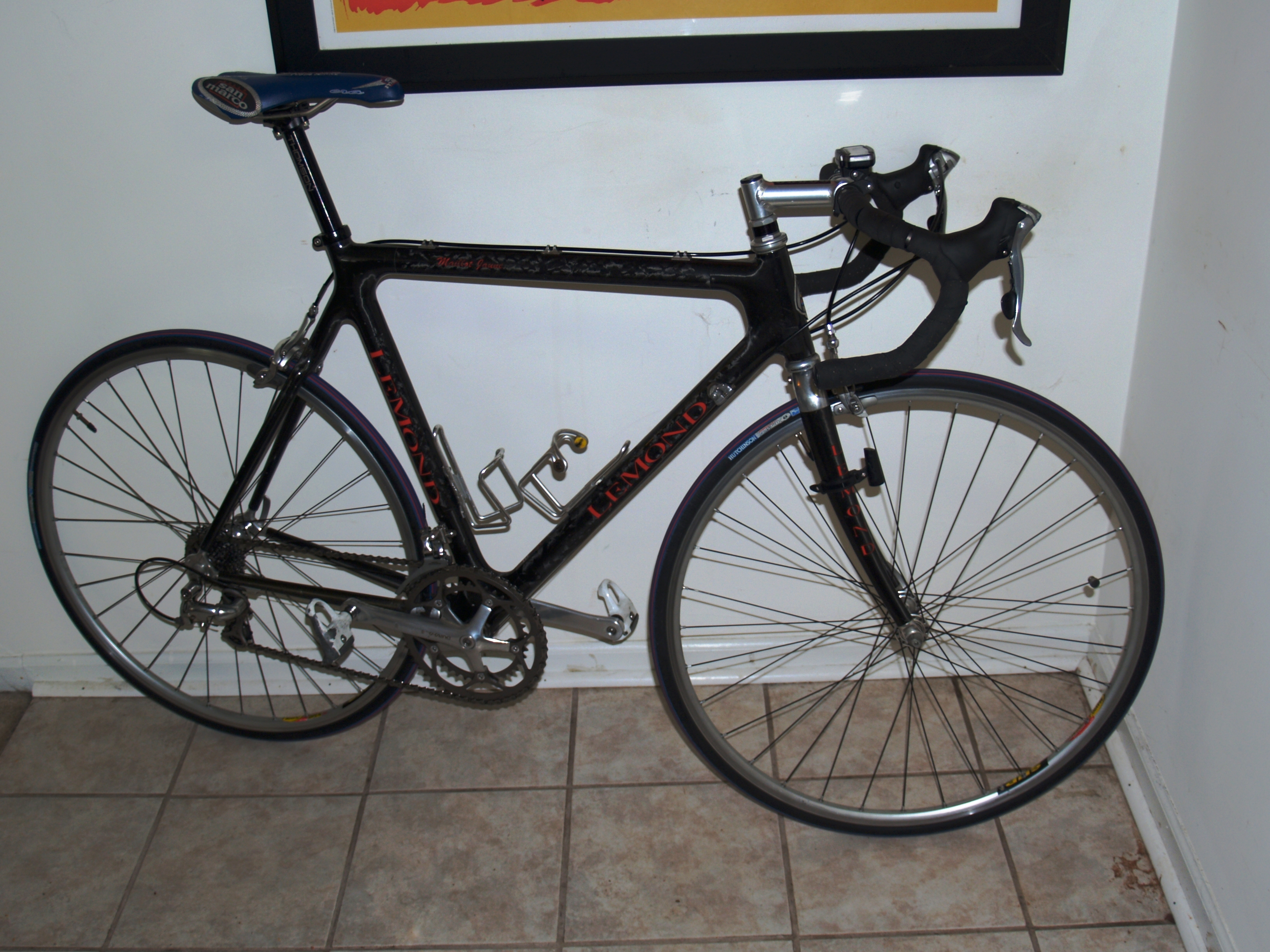
1997 Black LeMond OCLV Maillot Jaune

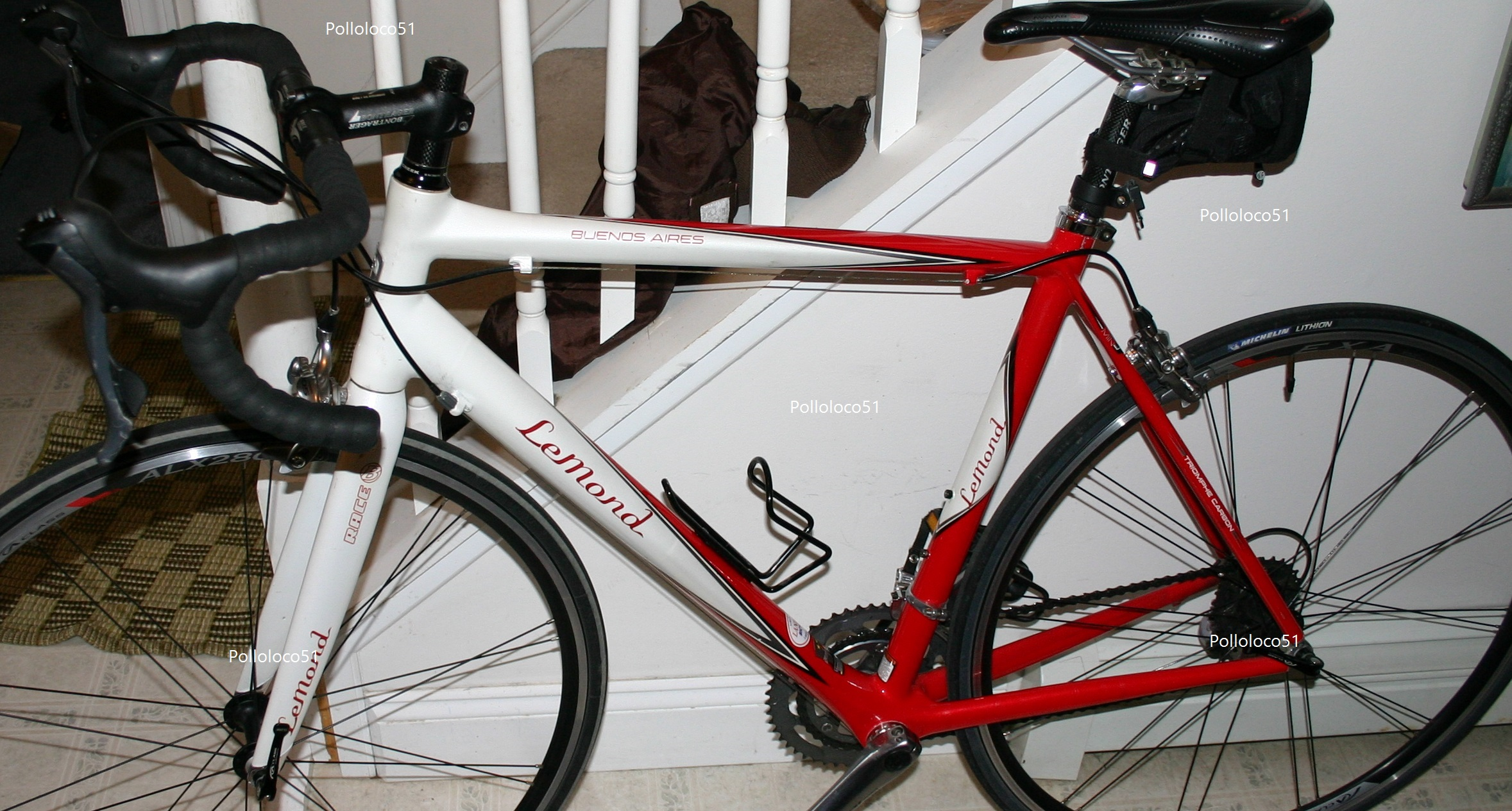
2007 Lemond Buenos Aires

- Reno
- Nevada City
- Wayzata
- Buenos Aires
- Versailles
- Tourmalet
- Alpe d'Huez
- Big Sky SLT
- Tete de Course
- Etape
- Poprad
- Sarthe
- Fillmore
- Zurich
- Chambéry
- M J Classic
- Maillot Jaune
- Rennes
- Limoges
- Victoire
- Arrivee
- Croix de Fer
- LTD 86
- LTD 89
- LTD 90
- Washoe
