= Catrike =

American tricycle brand

Manufacturer	Big Cat Human Powered Vehicles
Cycle line	Tadpole style tricycles
Introduced	2000; 25 years ago
Status	In production
Models	7
Website	www.catrike.com

Catrike is a brand of lightweight tadpole-design recumbent tricycles manufactured by Big Cat HPV, LLC, which is based in Orlando, Florida, United States. The company was founded in 1999 by Paulo Camasmie. Catrike riders have an annual factory-sponsored rally in March. Big Cat builds more trikes equipped with direct-steering than any other manufacturer in the world.

== Models ==
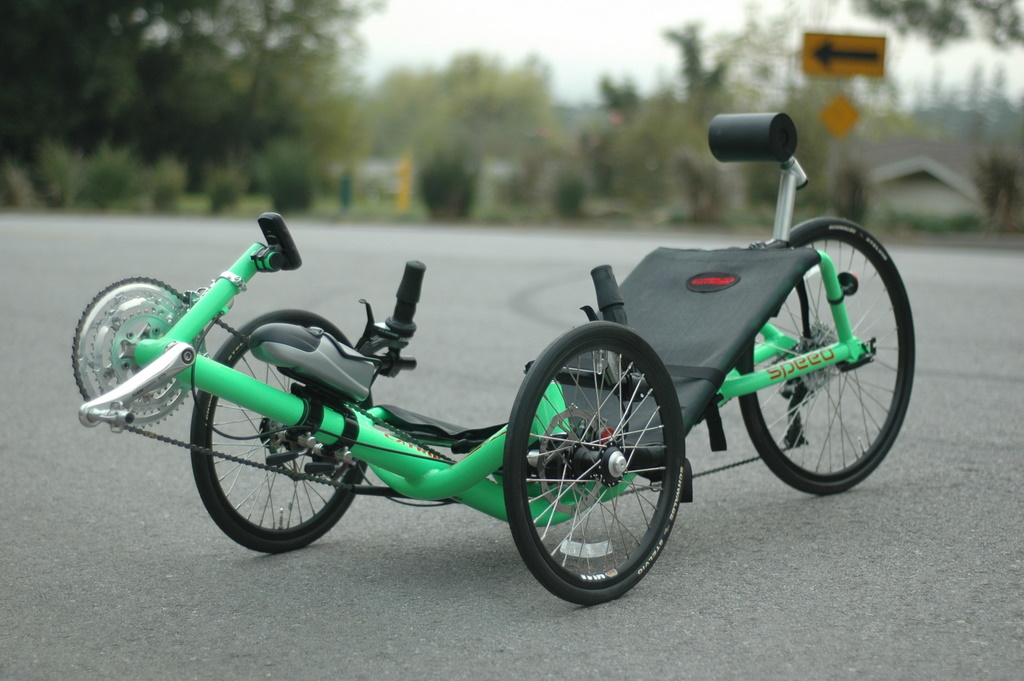
2006 model Catrike Speed

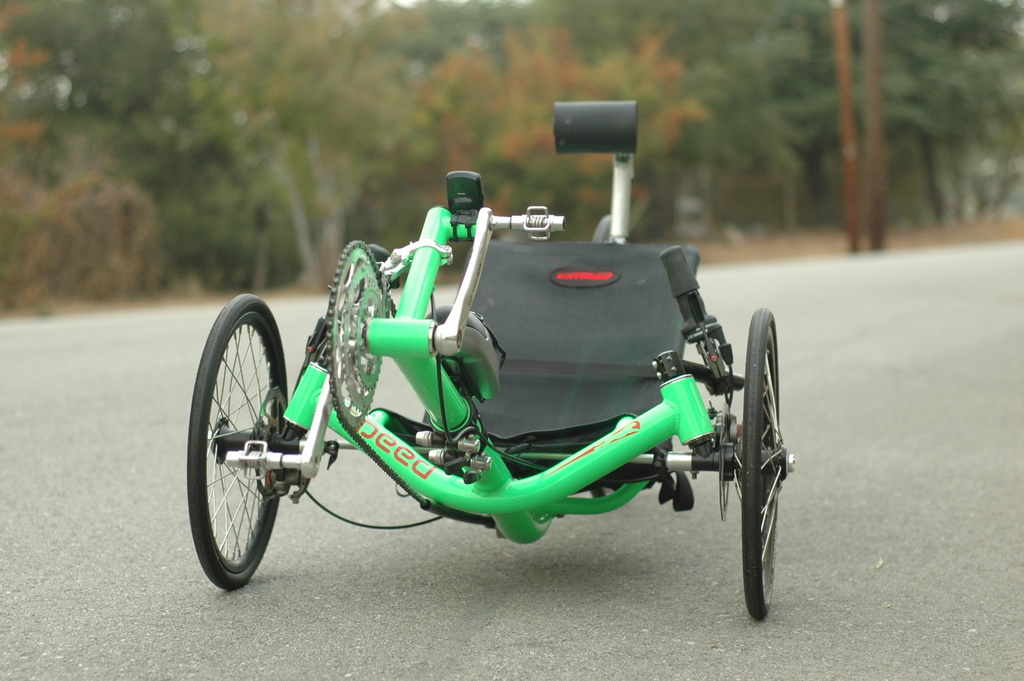
2006 model Catrike Speed

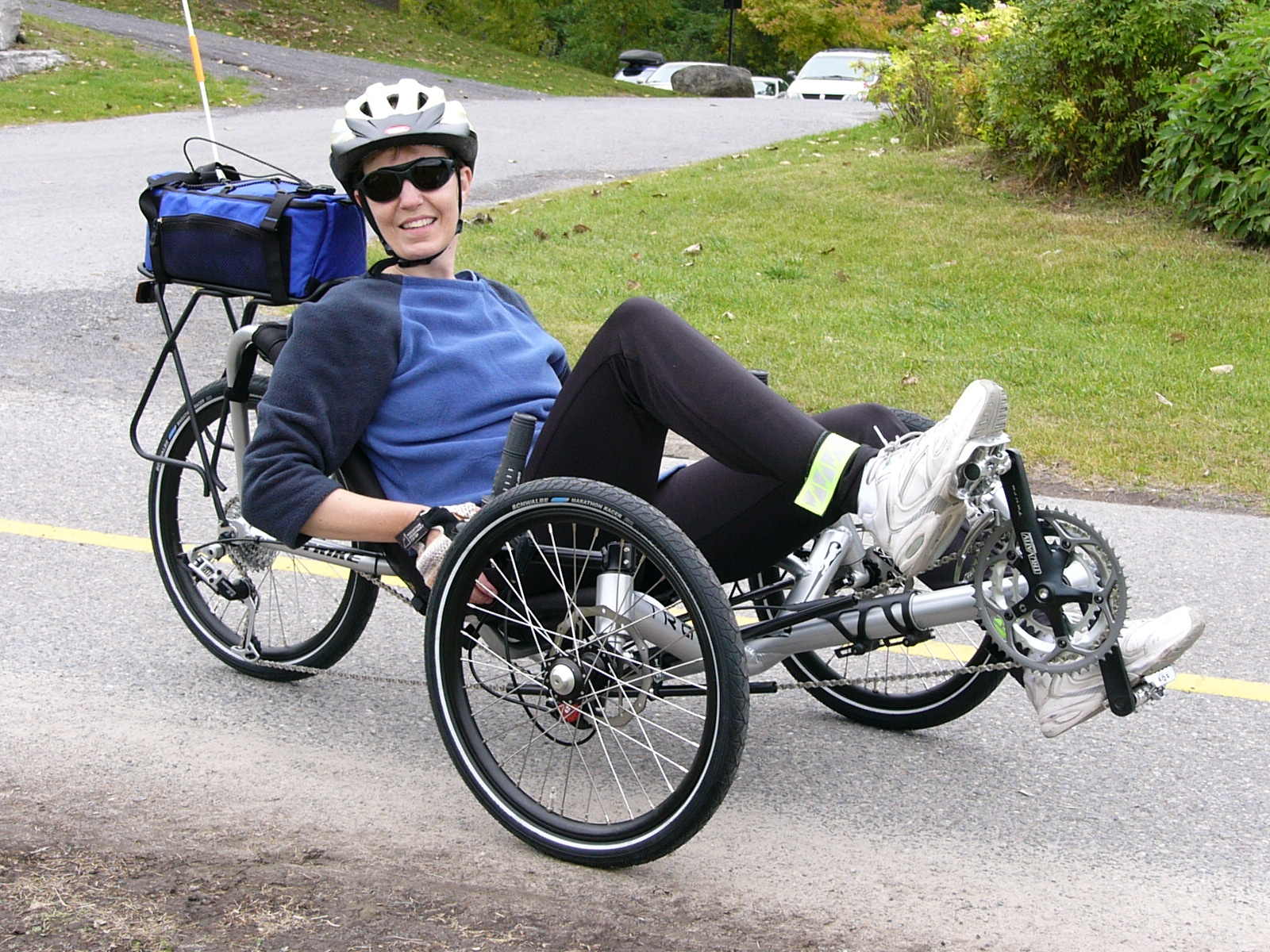
2009 model Catrike Trail

The 2020 Catrike line consists of eight models: the Expedition, Pocket, Trail, Villager, 700, Dumont, 5.5.9 and Eola. All Catrikes have heat-treated aluminum frames, front disc brakes and either a padded or nylon mesh seat. Steering is 'direct', via side levers, with Ackerman steering geometry. Rider size variations are accommodated via a telescoping boom that mounts the crankset.

Road
The Road was the first Catrike model and was introduced in 2000. As a result of experience developing the Speed model, the Road was redesigned in 2003. The new version became available in 2004. The 2005 model introduced indirect steering, which proved more difficult to set the toe-in, and so, in 2006, direct steering was reintroduced. The Road has 20 in (51 cm) wheels and is designed for general recreational use and touring. The Road was upgraded with the Dumont's front suspension axles in 2017 and renamed Road AR. Production of the Road AR ended in early 2020.
Speed
The Speed was the second Catrike model introduced and was first available on the market in 2003. It has a 20 in (51 cm) drive wheel and 16 in (41 cm) front wheels and, while it is designed to be fast, reviewers have also found it suitable for touring. The Speed was discontinued in 2011.
Pocket
The Pocket was introduced as a 2005 model year. It has 16" front wheels and a 20 in (51 cm) rear wheel with a 37 in (94 cm) wheelbase, shorter than that of the Road or Speed models. It is described as a "light trike that is compact and easy to transport." Reviewer Bryan Ball termed the 2005 model Pocket: "a light and spunky little trike with good handling and good comfort." It is especially intended for riders shorter than 5 ft 8 in (173 cm) tall. The Pocket has a 45-degree seat angle.
700
The 700 was introduced as a 2007 model. It is a performance trike with a 700C rear wheel and, originally 16 in (41 cm) (ETRTO 349) front wheels. Subsequent changes to design include 20" (ETRTO 406) front wheels and a thru-axle rear hub. It is the most reclined of all the models, with a 25-degree seat angle.
Expedition
The Expedition was introduced as a 2007 model. It is a recreational/performance/touring trike with a 26 in (66 cm) rear wheel and 20 in (51 cm) front wheels. It is the largest trike Catrike currently makes.
Trail
The Trail was introduced in the 2007 model year is a recreational/touring trike. It has 20 in (51 cm) wheels and is smaller than the Road but larger than the Pocket. In reviewing it Bryan Ball said: "It’s quick, it feels light and responsive and it didn’t give me any nasty surprises."
Villager
Introduced in 2008, the Villager is designed for urban settings and features comparatively greater ground clearance, a higher seat of 12.5 in (32 cm) and a 50 degree seat angle. The Villager has 20 in (51 cm) front and rear wheels. The 2008 model was introduced as a nine-speed with no front derailleur. The 2009 model included the option of a front triple crankset, giving 27 speeds.
Dash
The Dash, introduced in 2009, is designed for children and has 349/406 wheels. In reviewing the Dash, Parker Ball indicated that it is stable and that the rear wheel stays on the ground in fast stops. The Dash was discontinued at the end of 2011 due to low sales volume.
Musashi
In early 2010 Big Cat HPV introduced their first two-wheeled design, a short-wheelbase recumbent bicycle marketed under the Catbike name. The Musashi was discontinued at the end of 2011 to concentrate on trikes.
5.5.9
The 5.5.9 was introduced in 2015 and is named for the ETRTO tire size of 559, a 26" wheel, used on the trike's rear. The model is a folding design, and has a seat that is 2 in (51 mm) higher than the Trail and 1 in (25 mm) higher than the Expedition. The overall length is 4 in (102 mm) longer than the Expedition when unfolded. Due to the folding hinge, the larger rear wheel and longer frame the model weighs 39.5 lb (18 kg).
Dumont
The Dumont was introduced in 2015 and has full suspension, a 26" rear wheel, and folds for storage. It features an anti-dive front suspension spindle.
Eola
The Eola was introduced in 2019 and features 20-inch wheels, a 1 x 11 drivetrain and behind seat storage bag. The Eola ended production mid 2021.
eCATS
In 2020 Catrike introduced a line of electric-assist models. eCAT versions are available on the Dumont, 5.5.9, Expedition, Trail, Pocket and Villager models.

== Achievements and awards ==
- The first Catrike to complete a transcontinental crossing was a 2007 Catrike Road ridden by Lucinda Chandler in the spring of 2007 (58 days from California to Florida).
- BentRider Online Trike of the Year, 2003.
- BentRider Online Trike of the Year, Readers Choice 2004 - Catrike Road.

== See also ==
- List of bicycle manufacturers
