= Trident Trikes =

Manufacturer of recumbent tricycles

- Founded: 2009
- Headquarters: Lincolnton, North Carolina, United States
- Products: recumbent bicycles
- Website: tridenttrikes.com

Trident Trikes is a manufacturer of recumbent tricycles, based in Lincolnton, North Carolina, United States.

== Models ==
As of December 2021, Trident's product lineup includes mostly tadpole trikes, with two front wheels and one rear wheel. Despite their trademarked motto "3 wheels good... 2 wheels bad!", they do offer the T.W.I.G as a 2 wheel recumbent. Some models are available with electric (E) assist options.

- Chameleon Convertitrike Tandem/Single
- Stowaway I & II
- Spike 1, 2 & 380 (E)
- Transport 20 & 26
- Trekker 20 & 26 Hidden Suspension
- Fat Trekker 20/26 Suspension (E)
- Terrain 20 & 26 Fat Tire (E)
- E Titan (E)
- T.W.I.G (Two Wheels IS Good) 2 wheel

== See also ==
List of bicycle manufacturers
