= Baltik vairas =

Coordinates: 55°55′8″N 23°17′49″E

- Company type: Private
- Industry: Bicycle manufacturing
- Founded: 1993
- Headquarters: Šiauliai, Lithuania
- Products: Bicycles
- Revenue: €184.846 million
- Operating income: €4.325 million
- Net income: €3.528 million
- Number of employees: 520
- Website: www.baltikvairas.lt/

Baltik vairas (English: Baltic steering wheel) is a bicycle manufacturer located in Šiauliai, Lithuania. Tracing its lineage to 1948, the present-day joint-stock company Baltik vairas was established in 1993, after privatization of a state-owned enterprise and is one of the largest bicycle manufacturers in Northern Europe. Baltik vairas focuses on product development, coating and coloring of bicycle components, bicycle decoration and assembly as well as delivery and warranty (full service). The company manufactures around 320,000 bicycles per year, with annual capacity of 500,000, and exports its production to 15 countries.

== Details ==
Baltik vairas offers city, trekking, mountain, and kids' bikes as well as e-bikes and custom bicycles such as tandems, tricycles for ice-cream carts, industrial bicycles etc. In total, around 500 different models and over 50 brand-name bicycles are manufactured each year.

The company is one of the largest employers in Šiauliai district. It has 320 permanent employees and during the peak season, the number of employees usually exceeds 600. The turnover of Baltik vairas reached 56.1 mln. EUR in 2013. The main market of Baltik vairas is Western Europe, however, expansion to Northern, Central and Eastern European markets is planned in the near future. Baltik vairas is a member of German–Baltic Chamber of Commerce and of Šiauliai Chamber of Commerce, Industry and Crafts.

== History ==
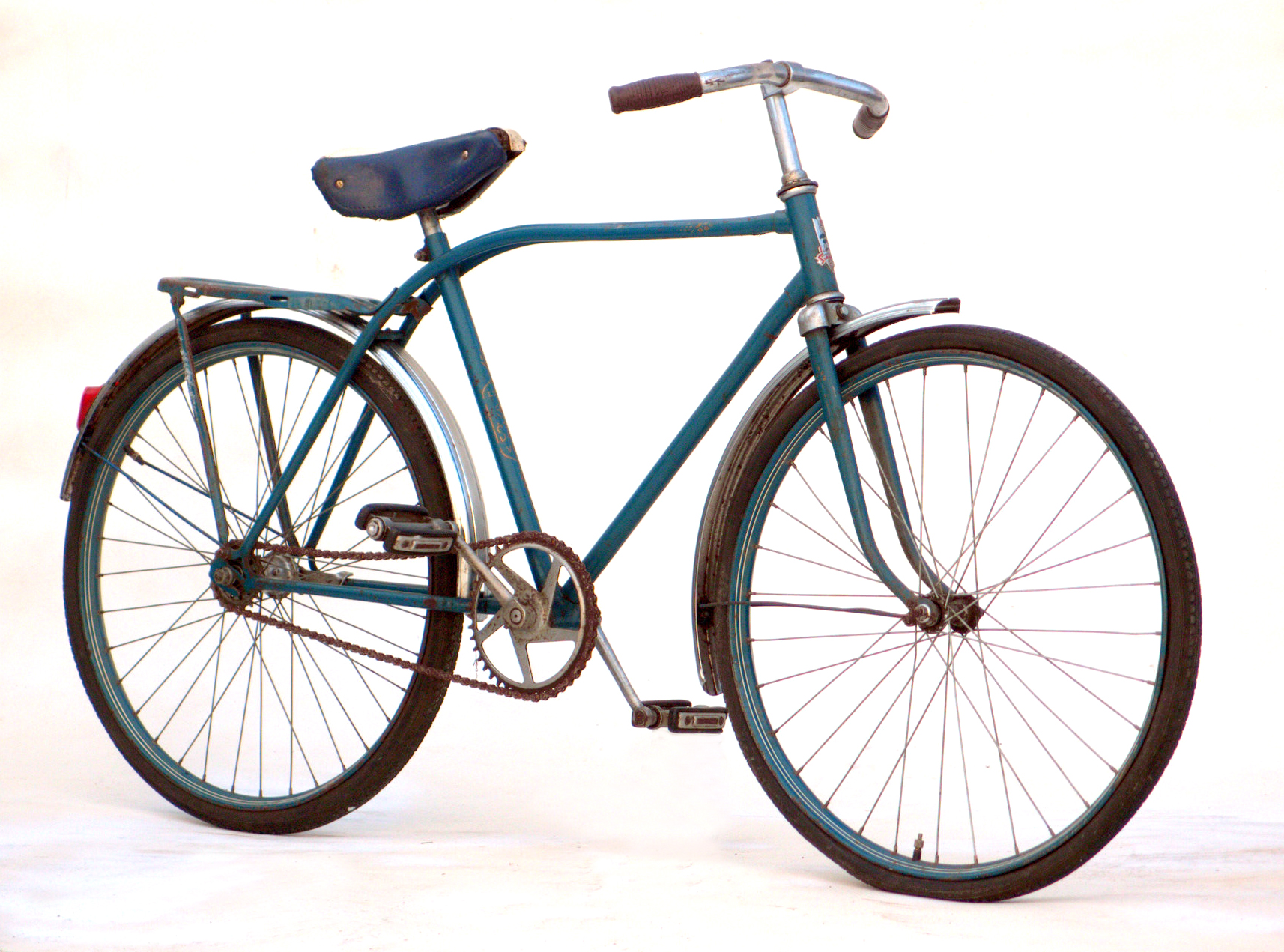
"Ereliukas"

The company traces its history to a state enterprise Šiauliai Bicycle Factory established on 23 December 1948 in the Lithuanian SSR. It began producing bicycles for teenagers called Ereliukas (English: little eagle; boys' version) in 1951 and bicycles Kregždutė (English: little swallow; girls' version) in 1952. Initially, since 1950, they were manufactured in the Belarusian SSR at the Minsk Motorcycle and Bicycle Plant (MMBP) under the corresponding Russian names "Orlyonok" and "Lastochka" based on the pre-WWII German models. Their manufacturing was transferred to Lithuania after MMBP started manufacturing Minsk motorcycle, based on the equipment taken from the German DKW factory as part of Soviet World War II reparations.

These bicycles were exported to Germany, Mexico, Finland, Romania, Greece, India, Egypt, Belgium, Hungary, and Turkey. It was the first export item produced by a Šiauliai city industrial enterprise. On 23 June 1964, the factory was renamed Šiauliai bicycle–engine factory Vairas. By 1982, it employed 3,500 people.

The joint Lithuanian–German company Baltik vairas was founded on 18 March 1993. It purchased a portion of the state-owned enterprise and became one of the holdings of Panther International GmbH. By 1999, the company produced one million bicycles. In 2011, the 5,000,000th bicycle left the production line (since privatization). In September 2013, a private Danish investor acquired shares in the company.
