= Volagi Cycles =

American bicycle company

- Company type: Private
- Industry: Bicycles
- Founded: 2010; 16 years ago
- Headquarters: Ogden, Utah, United States
- Key people: Robert Choi, Barley Forsman
- Products: Bicycle and related components
- Website: www.volagi.com

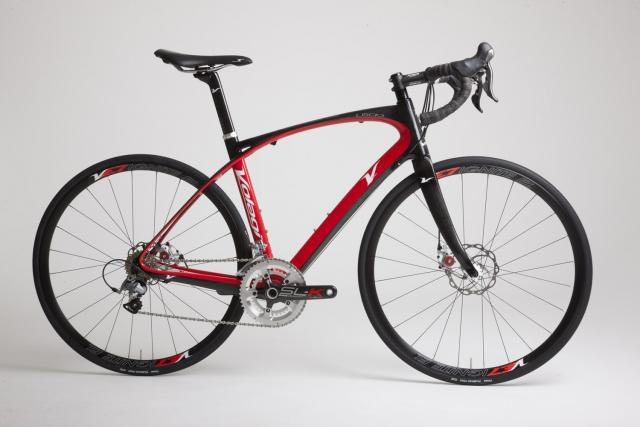
Volagi Liscio

Volagi Cycles was an American company that manufactured bicycles and related components. Founded in 2010 by two bicycle industry designers, Robert Choi and Barley Forsman, Volagi had six international distributors, as well as eighty bicycle dealers in the United States.

== History ==
Originally based in Cotati, California, Volagi was founded in 2010 by Robert Choi and Barley Forsman, both former employees of Specialized Bicycle Components and CamelBak.

In 2012 the company was sued by Specialized Bicycle Components, for theft of trade secrets and breach of employment contract, as well as other charges. Of Specialized's nine claims, eight were thrown out of court, and the jury awarded Specialized one dollar in damages on the remaining count (breach of employment contract) that went to trial. It was estimated by Choi and Forsman's attorney, Tyler Paetkau, that Specialized incurred more than $2M in legal fees to practice "competition by litigation."

In September 2016, Volagi announced that it would close its doors after a founding member was injured in a bicycle accident involving an automobile.

Volagi sponsored athletes such as Chris Ragsdale, compete in ultra-cycling events such as Race Across America.

== See also ==
- List of bicycle brands and manufacturing companies
- List of bicycle parts
