= Kinesis Industry =

Kinesis Industry Co. Ltd. is a manufacturer of aluminum and carbon fiber bicycle frames, forks, and components. Based in Taiwan, it has a plant in Guangzhou, China, and an American subsidiary (Kinesis USA, Inc.) in Portland, Oregon that generated $5-$10 million in annual sales until ceasing production and closing its doors in 2006. The company was founded in 1989 by former employees of Giant Bicycles, and was headed by Tom Jeng until 2011, when he left to form Jovial Bike Components.

Kinesis manufactures and markets its own brand of frames, forks, complete bicycles and accessories which are available only in Argentina, Australia, Brazil, Chile, Colombia, Germany, Israel, South Korea, Malaysia, the Philippines, and the United Kingdom.

Brands also manufactured by Kinesis include Commencal, Diamondback Bicycles, Felt Bicycles, GT Bicycles, Haro, Ideal, Jamis, K2, Kona, Kross, Raleigh, Redline Bicycles, Santa Cruz Bicycles, Schwinn, Storck, Sunn, Titus Cycles, Torker, and Trek — as well as the brands marketed by the U.S. company Bikesdirect.com: Motobecane USA, Dawes USA, Cycles Mercier, Windsor America.

Kinesis employs 1,430 people.

In December 2001, Kinesis acquired Mountain Cycle, a bicycle manufacturer in Portland, Oregon, and in June, 2006, sold it to Ideation Industrial, a Taiwanese manufacturer.

== See also ==
- List of companies of Taiwan
