= Next (bicycle company) =

American bicycle brand

NEXT Bicycle Company
- Logo used since 2015
- Company type: Subsidiary
- Founded: 1999; 27 years ago
- Founder: Paul Anderson
- Headquarters: American Canyon, California
- Key people: John Bisges CEO
- Products: Bicycles
- Parent: Dynacraft
- Website: http://www.dynacraftbike.com/

Next is an American bicycle brand distributed by Dynacraft BSC, Kent International Inc and Bridgeway International bicycle companies. Next bikes are produced in China and are sold in the American retail stores Wal-Mart.

== Models ==
Next sells children's, BMX, and mountain bikes.

18"

- Misty - 6–9 years old
- Surge - 6–9 years old

20"

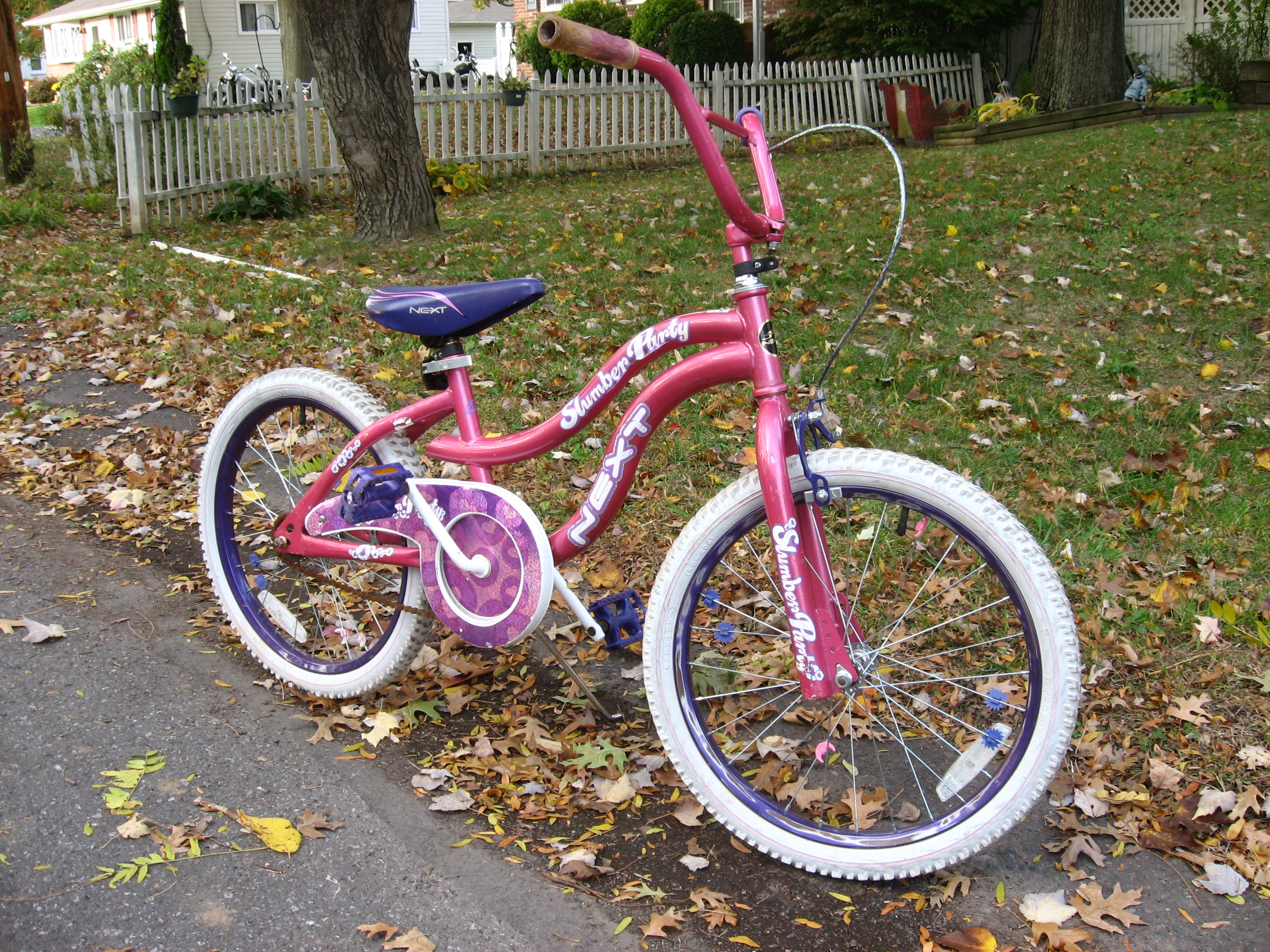
Next Slumber Party girls bike

- Girl Talk- 6–10 years old
- Shock Edge - full suspension MTB for ages 6–10 years old
- Air Wave - full suspension MTB for ages 6–10 years
- Wipe Out - 6–10 years old

24"

- Gauntlet - full suspension MTB for young adults
- Highpeak - full suspension MTB for young adults

26"

- Gauntlet - full suspension MTB

== Recalls in 2002 and 2003 ==
In 2002, 132,000 Next Ultra Shock mountain bicycles with "Ballistic 105" front suspension forks were recalled in cooperation with the U.S. Consumer Product Safety Commission (CPSC). There were 20 reports of the suspension forks breaking on the Next Ultra Shock bicycles, resulting in 19 riders suffering injuries that include abrasions, concussions and chipped teeth. By Us International Co. Ltd. manufactured the forks on these bicycles. These forks can break apart, causing riders to lose control, fall and suffer serious injury. The recall is being conducted in cooperation with the U.S. Consumer Product Safety Commission (CPSC) which previously announced the recall of about 103,000 of these forks sold on bicycles manufactured by Brunswick Corp. There have been 20 reports of the suspension forks breaking on the Next Ultra Shock bicycles, resulting in 19 riders suffering injuries that include abrasions, concussions and chipped teeth. The recall includes only on blue Next Ultra Shock bicycles, with model numbers 8524-14 and 8526-20 manufactured between April 1999 and November 9, 1999. Wal-Mart stores nationwide sold these mountain bikes from May 1999 through December 2000.

During 2003, Dynacraft voluntarily recalled about 52,900 BMX bicycles whose stems could loosen during use, causing riders to lose control and fall. Dynacraft received 35 reports of stems loosening on these bicycles, resulting in one report of an injury (a broken finger). The recall includes two models of 20-inch BMX bicycles. The Next Voltage-model bicycles are metallic green, have model number 8535-99 and were manufactured between March 2002 and June 2002. The Vertical Street Blade-model bicycles are dark blue and chrome colored, have model number 8527-99 and were manufactured between March 2002 and April 2002. Wal-Mart stores sold the Next Voltage-model bicycles nationwide, including Puerto Rico, from May 2002 through November 2002. Pamida stores sold the Vertical Street Blade-model bicycles nationwide from April 2002 through April 2003.
