= Robin Hood (bicycle company) =

English bicycle manufacturer

- Founded: Robin Hood Cycle Co Ltd acquired by Raleigh in 1906
- Headquarters: Nottingham, England
- Products: bicycles

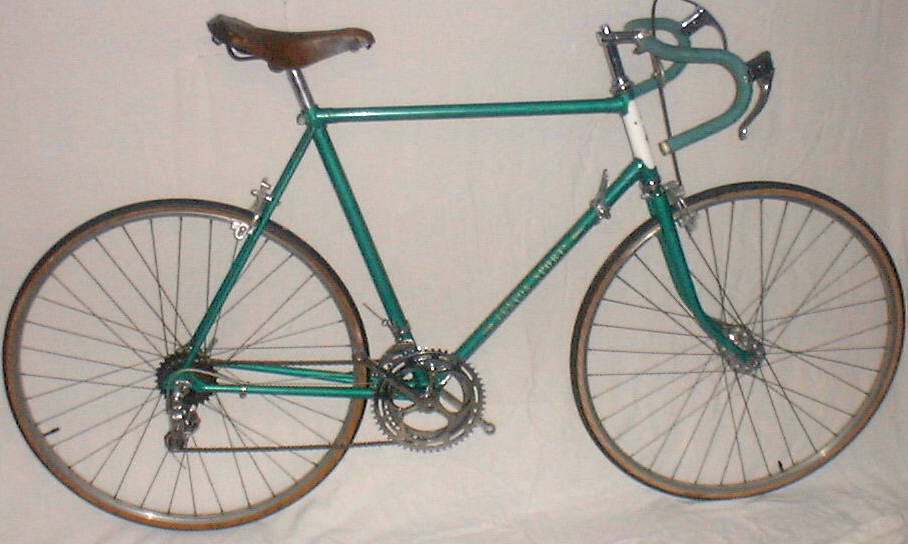

Robin Hood Cycle Co Ltd bicycles is an English manufacturer made in Nottingham England. It was acquired in 1906 by the Raleigh Bicycle Company, many of whose bicycles were imported into the United States. Best known for their three-speeds, they were an economy line for Raleigh. They also imported racing bikes such as the Lenton Sports.
