= Velomotors =

- Headquarters: Russia
- Products: Bicycles, motorscooters, smallall-terrain vehicles

Velomotors (Russian: Веломоторс) is a Russian manufacturer of bicycles, motorscooters, and small all-terrain vehicles (ATVs) that was founded in 1996. Velomotors produces the Stels brand of bicycles and motorscooters. In 2009 the company entered into a manufacturing arrangement with the Asian companies Buyang, Kazuma, and Dinli.

== Ownership ==
The company is 70% owned by the Nachevkin brothers, Alexandr (40%) and Yuri (30%). The remaining 30% ownership is held by Igor Ivanov.

== Revenue ==
In 2007 the company produced 987,000 units of equipment, including Stels bikes and scooters. Revenues in 2007 amounted to 2.8 billion rubles, up from 2.1 billion in 2006.

== Factories ==
The first Velomotors factory was built in 2003 in Kubinka in the Odintsovo region of Moscow Oblast.

In 2006, a second plant was built in partnership with the Velotrans firm, in Zhukovka in Bryansk Oblast. This plant is equipped to produce aluminum crankcases. The company plans to expand this plant to increase its production of ATVs.
