= Bacchetta Bicycles =

American bicylce company, 2001 to 2021

Bacchetta

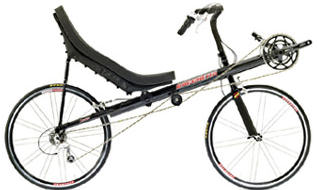
- 2007 Bacchetta Corsa
- Company type: Brand
- Industry: Bicycle
- Founded: 2001
- Defunct: June 18, 2021; 4 years ago
- Fate: Acquired
- Headquarters: North Hollywood, Los Angeles, United States
- Products: Recumbent bicycles
- Owner: Bent Up Cycles
- Website: www.bacchettabikes.com

Bacchetta is an American brand of recumbent bicycles based in North Hollywood, Los Angeles, California. The company was founded in 2001 and it makes recumbent bikes and accessories.

On June 18, 2021, the Bacchetta Brand Line was sold to Bent Up Cycles, who continued to produce bicycles under the Bacchetta Brand.

== Models ==
Long Wheelbase

- Bella (20"/26" wheels)
- Agio (20"/26" wheels) (Discontinued)

Short Wheelbase

- Strada (26" wheels)
- Giro-20 (20"/26" wheels) (Discontinued)
- Giro-A20 (20"/26" wheels)
- Giro-A26 (dual 26" wheels)
- Corsa-A70 (dual 700c wheels)
- Corsa-A65 (dual 650c wheels)
- Carbon Corsa (dual 700 or 650c wheels) (Discontinued)
- Carbon Aero 2.0 700c (dual 700c wheels) (Discontinued)
- Carbon Aero 2.0 650c (dual 650c wheels) (Discontinued)
- Carbon Aero 3.0 700c (dual 700c wheels, disc brake compatible)
- Carbon Basso 2.0 (20"/700c wheels) (Discontinued)
- Carbon Basso 3.0 (20"/700c wheels, disc brake compatible)

Trikes

- CarbonTrike CT2.0 (2x 20"wheels / 1x 700c wheel) (Discontinued in April 2021 when the design was sold back to Carbontrikes)
