= Van Dessel Sports =

American racing bicycle manufacturer

- Company type: Private
- Industry: Bicycles
- Founded: 2000; 26 years ago
- Headquarters: Mendham, New Jersey, United States
- Products: Bicycles
- Website: www.vandesselcycles.com

Van Dessel Sports is a racing bicycle brand based in Mendham, New Jersey, United States. It was founded in 2000 by Edwin Bull, a former professional cyclist from Belgium. They specialize in cyclo-cross bicycles and hard-tail mountain bikes.
