= Citizen Bike =

American folding bicycles manufacturer

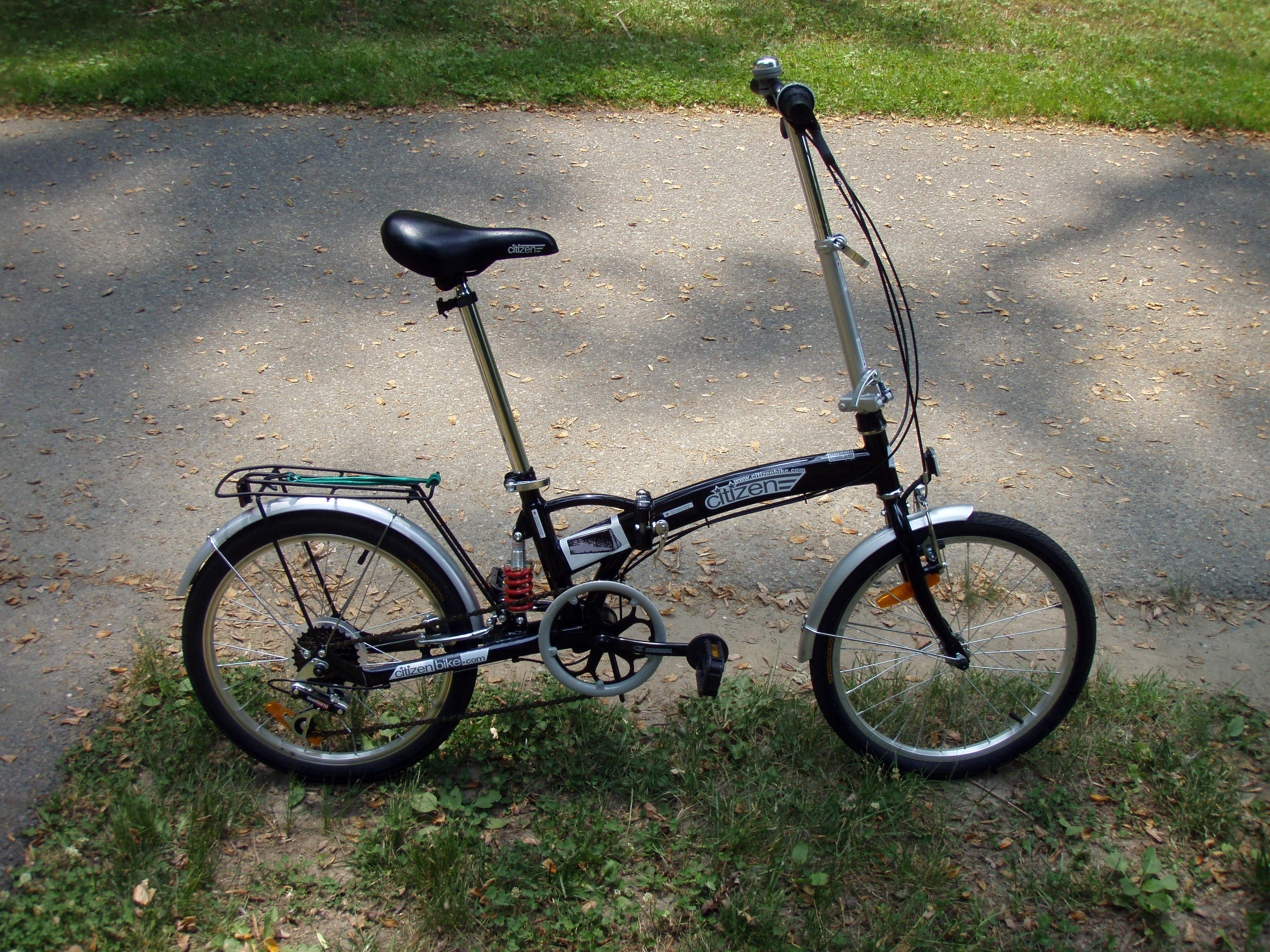
- 2007 model
- Founded: 2006
- Headquarters: Dania Beach, Florida, United States
- Products: Folding bicycles
- Website: www.citizenbike.com

Citizen Bike is a manufacturer of folding bicycles, based on a philosophy of affordability. Its line of low-cost bicycles are shipped directly to customers and do not require any assembly. These bicycles fold to a size comparable to other brands but are generally heavier.

The compact size of Citizen folding bikes makes them well suited for urban commuting, and they are airplane friendly when packed in an optional carrying bag. An early limited-edition model called MTA MetroBike, outfitted with reflective Metropolitan Transportation Authority route symbols, was showcased by the MTA as a train and bus-friendly bicycle.

The company offers a namesake mobile app to help map rides and count calories.

== Models ==
Models are named after real or fictional cities.

- Milan
- Tokyo
- Miami
- Seoul
- Rome
- Gotham 7
- Gotham 3
- Gotham 24-7
- Barcelona
- Lil London (electric)
- London (electric)
