= Zigo =

Brand of carrier bikes

Zigo brand

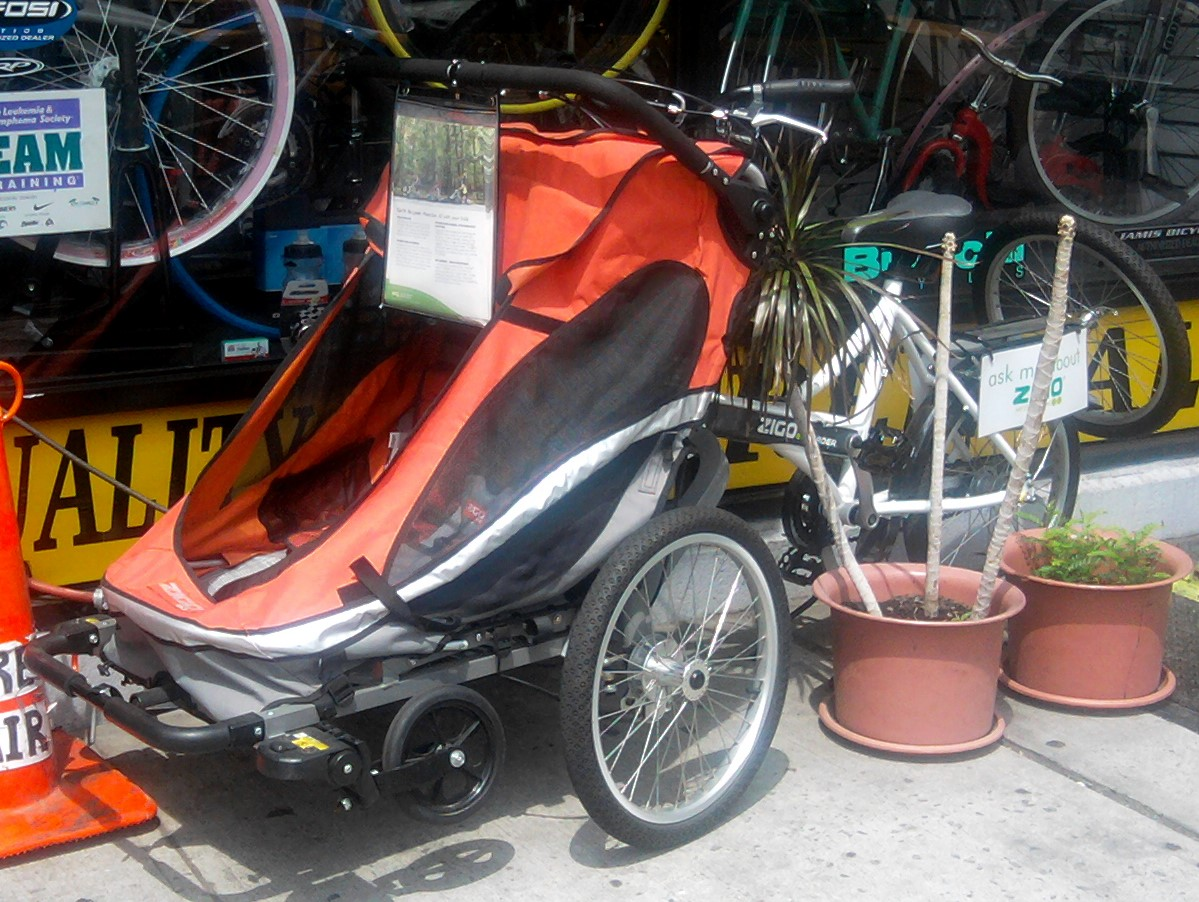
Zigo carrier

Zigo is a brand of carrier bike designed by US company SOMA Cycle, Inc., located in South Orange, NJ. The product is convertible into a stroller. The forward-located position of the child carrier is similar to existing products in Europe.

The design of the Zigo Leader carrier bike was conceived by Michael Ehrenreich in 2004.

== Models ==
- Zigo Leader X1 Carrier Bicycle - one child carrier bicycle.
- Zigo Leader X2 Carrier Bicycle - Two child carrier bicycle.

== Other products ==
- Zigo Mango - Jogging stroller/bike trailer - incompatible with the Zigo® Cycle LeaderLink® System. Will NOT function as a front-mounted carrier bicycle.
- Zigo Cycle - a stand-alone 3- or 7-speed small wheel bicycle compatible with the Zigo ChildPod and Mango
