= Neobike =

Company and brand of folding bicycles

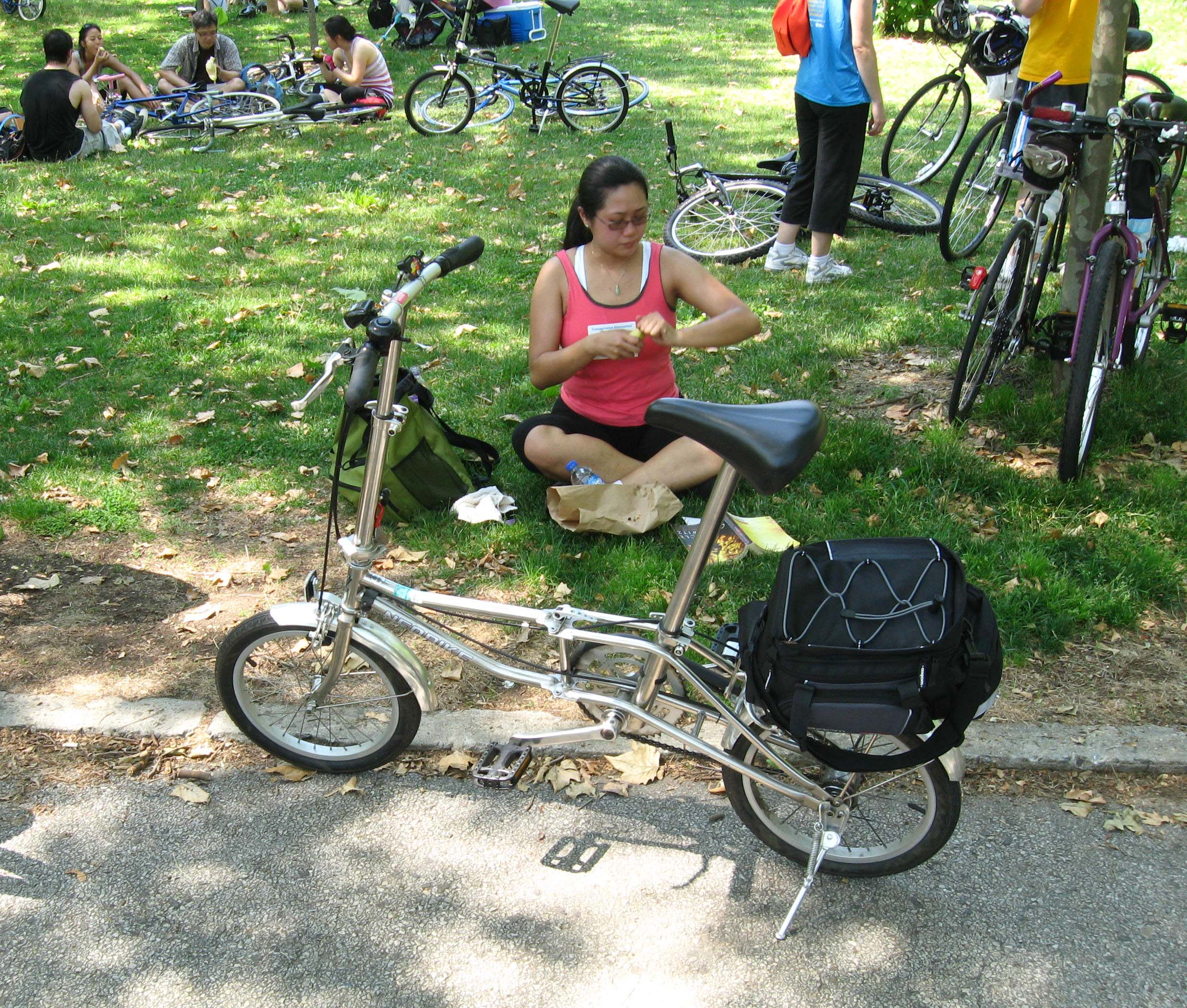
In New York

Neobike (Chinese: 龍通關) is a company and brand of folding bicycles, made in Taiwan. The company manufactures copies of folding bicycle designs, including those originally created by Brompton Bicycle and Dahon. Neobike's operation in copied products later became Grace Gallant (美捷士企業有限公司), sold under the Flamingo (佛朗明哥) brandname.

== History ==
Neobike International was originally created in 1992 as a joint-venture company formed between Euro-Tai SA of Taiwan and Brompton Bicycle Ltd of the United Kingdom. The remit was to produce officially licensed copies of the Brompton folding bicycle for sale into Asian and Japanese markets, where Brompton were not able to keep up with demand. For this, Brompton loaned Neobike design plans and specialist tooling, in exchange for a per-unit royalty agreement.

Later during 1992 the Neobike company hired a number of ex-Dahon employees from Dahon's research and development department and started to produce unlicensed Dahon copies, in addition to its officially sanctioned Brompton model. Original Brompton folding bicycles manufactured by Brompton Bicycle Ltd in England were made of steel, but the frame material for the Taiwan copies was changed from steel to aluminium.

On 31 December 2002 the ten-year franchise agreement between Brompton and Euro-Tai for Neobike to produce officially licensed Brompton models expired, at which point Euro-Tai and Neobike failed to return loaned tools to Brompton Bicycle Ltd. During the ten-year period the royalties paid had amounted to under £10,000. One week later, on 7 January 2003, Euro-Tai sold its majority stake in Neobike to YTS Manufacturing, an aluminium extrusion company who had already been producing frames for Neobike.

During 2003, Neobike exhibited a—now unlicensed—copy of the Brompton bicycle design at the European Eurobike show. Unlicensed copies of the Brompton product were then imported into The Netherlands (under the name "Scoop One" and "Astra Flex V3"), into the United Kingdom (under the name "Merc") and into Spain (as the Nishiki "Oxford Bicycle").

In 2004, Grace Gallant Enterprises was created, and Neobike's interests in the unlicensed copy designs were transferred to Grace Gallant, to be sold under the "Flamingo" brandname.

=== Court cases ===
On 2 April 2002 in Dahon vs. Hsiao, et al, five senior Neobike employees were convicted and given jail sentences for a variety of business-related offences, including patent fraud. Three employees who had previously worked in Dahon's research and development department from the late 1980s, up until the formation of Neobike International in 1992 were convicted on their violation of signed non-compete contracts.

On 26 February 2004 a consignment of 250+ "Scoop" branded bicycles were impounded at the decision of the court in Groningen, in The Netherlands. The judgement against Vincent van Ellen and Neobike Europe on copyright grounds was released later in September 2004. On 24 May 2006 in Brompton Bicycle Limited v Rijwielbedrijf Vincent Van Ellen BV, Neobike's Dutch importer was convicted of copyright infringement of the Brompton design under Article 19 of the Dutch Copyright law. The entire import of Neobike Brompton-copies were seized and destroyed along with an injunction to prevent further imports.

In June 2010, Brompton Bicycle Limited obtained an injunction at the Commercial Court No. 5 in Madrid, Spain, following a ruling that copies of the Brompton being sold under the name "Nishiki Oxford" infringed Brompton's copyright.
