= Chicago Bicycle Company =

American bicycle company

Chicago Bicycle headbadge

The Chicago Bicycle Company was a short-lived American bicycle company which operated from 1994 to 1998. It was headquartered in Burlington, Vermont, with its main production facilities in Chicago.

== History ==
The original Chicago Bicycle Company was founded in 1994 and owned by Vermont Teddy Bear Company owner and CEO John Sortino. The company had its headquarters in Burlington, Vermont, with production in Chicago, with an assembly and retail space in Burlington. Based on practicality, the bicycle was designed for comfort and ease, using an internal-gear hub, available in both 3.5 and 7-speed options, with "step-over" and "step-thru" frames available and customizable for color, saddle, handlebar and size.

The Chicago bicycle was designed as a durable, low-maintenance bicycle for commuting and recreational use.

The bicycles were marketed via cold calling, based initially on a purchased list of yacht club members. They also used radio ads to encourage people to come into the factory at 363 West Erie Street in Chicago to test ride and to order a custom bicycle.

Sachs Super-7 rear alloy hub w/. drum brake

Sortino hired Mark P. Walker, assembly and shop manager of the bike shop The SkiRack in Burlington, and Tim Matthewson, owner of Champion Cycles, also in Vermont, to design a marketable bicycle concept that would appeal to commuters and people wishing to have a practical alternative to the mountain bike and road bike without the complication of derailleurs, and above all, made in the U.S. The bicycles sold for between $500 and $1000, depending on hubs, and options chosen by the customer. They used internal gear hubs from Sachs, with drum, or internal, brakes, to avoid the complications of vulnerable external mechanisms. The bikes would later become known as "comfort cruisers", and though CBC was unsuccessful in marketing, famed bicycle maker and MTB pioneer Joe Breeze later produced his own straight-tubed version.

=== Production ===
Fifty frame-sets were originally fabricated by Tri-Angle Metal Fab in Milton, Vermont, and 50 more were made by Waterford Precision cycles of Waterford, Wisconsin, under the guise of Richard Schwinn (great-grandson of Ignaz Schwinn) and Mark Muller. After that, the CBC built their own in a factory on 363 W. Erie in Chicago. On the first floor, there was a retail space with representative bicycles, and an indoor track that surrounded the retail floor. The actual factory was on the floor above, and was equipped with lathes, mill, welding stations, and powdercoat booth. A bicycle could be built to order inside of a week in most instances.

The design of the bicycles was carried out cooperatively between Mark Walker in Vermont and Patrick Ege, industrial designer and Joe Ryan, welder, both from Chicago, who worked to develop the frame geometries in CAD, welding jig setups, and completed most of final prototyping and testing. Joe Ryan also served as the shop foreman and oversaw fabrication at the facility in Chicago including milling operations, welding, and powder coating. Vincent Delfini, a bicycle technician also from Chicago, oversaw the assembly of the bicycles in the Chicago plant. Approximately only 100 or so were made at the factory before the company went out of business in 1997.

The framesets were made from True Temper 4130 CrMo Steel with Reynolds 531 chainstays, and CBC's own CrMo fork. The frames were powdercoated to any color to order, or to any of the several predetermined models. CBC offered Sachs 3,5, and 7 speed hubs, with Sun M25 rims. A selection of handlebars, saddles, mudguards, racks, were added per customer's specs. The headbadge was made in Middlebury, Vermont, by Danforth Pewterers, by lost-wax casting method. These badges cost $10 each to produce, and were hand fitted to every frame. Models include the 'Shoreline Cruiser', 'City Attack Cruiser', 'Silver Shadow', and the 'Wonder Bike'.

Five bikes with 22" frames made for the Burlington Police Department, with Sachs 7-speed alloy front and rear hubs with dual drum brakes.

Chicago Bicycle 7-speed

=== End of company ===
In 1998, Stephen Marmon took over as chairman and CEO at the request of investors. It was renamed U.S. Bicycle Corp. At that point, the company was suffering substantial losses. "I shut down all production within days of becoming CEO," said Marmon.

Although he still felt that an expensive cruiser could be a viable business proposition, Marmon says the built-to-order model did not work, saying that the cost of production was too high. That, coupled with the low number of bikes the company produced, made profitability virtually impossible. CBC was renamed the US Bicycle Corp and Marmon says he is working with investors to turn the company into a roll-up.

== Retail store ==
Chicago Bicycle Company, unrelated to the original factory, was a two-store bicycle chain in the city of Chicago. Founded in 2016, the business was owned by longtime retailer Denis Smith and his partner Elizabeth Georgescu.
