= Solifer =

Finnish vehicle manufacturer

Solifer Oy
- Company type: Osakeyhtiö
- Industry: Vehicle manufacturing
- Founded: 1954
- Headquarters: Pargas, Finland
- Area served: Worldwide
- Products: Bicycles; boats; mopeds; travel trailers
- Revenue: €110 million (2007)
- Number of employees: 450 (2007)
- Website: solifer.com

Solifer Oy is a Finnish manufacturer of bicycles, boats, mopeds and travel trailers. The company was founded in 1954, and it started as a dynamo manufacturer. As of 2007, the company's bicycles are manufactured in Poland, boats in Finland, mopeds in China, and travel trailers in Dorotea, Sweden.

In 2014, approximately a fifth of the 250,000 bicycles sold in Finland were Solifers.

== Mopeds ==
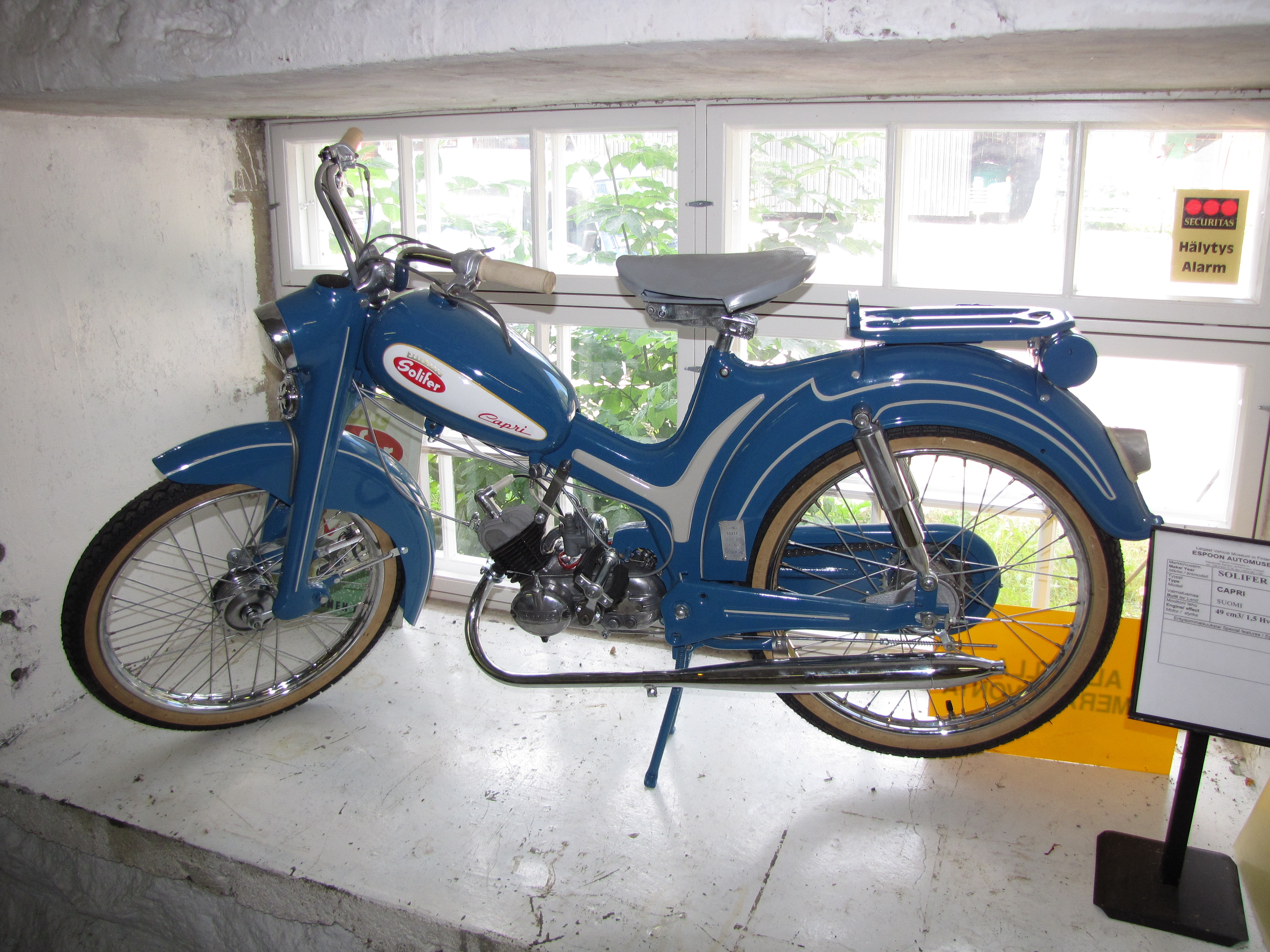
1958 Solifer Capri

Alongside Tunturi, Solifer was one of the significant moped manufactures in Finland from the late 1950s to the mid-1980s. From 1958 to 1984, around 175,000 Solifer mopeds were manufactured, of which over 20,000 were exported outside Finland. Solifers were distributed by AB Bensow Oy.

With approximately 1,200 registrations in the first half-year of 2010, China-manufactured Solifer BT49QT was the most registered moped in Finland at that time.
