= Gocycle =

Model of electric bicycle

- Industry: Electric bicycles
- Founded: 2002; 24 years ago
- Founder: Richard Thorpe
- Headquarters: Chessington, London, UK
- Website: gocycle.com

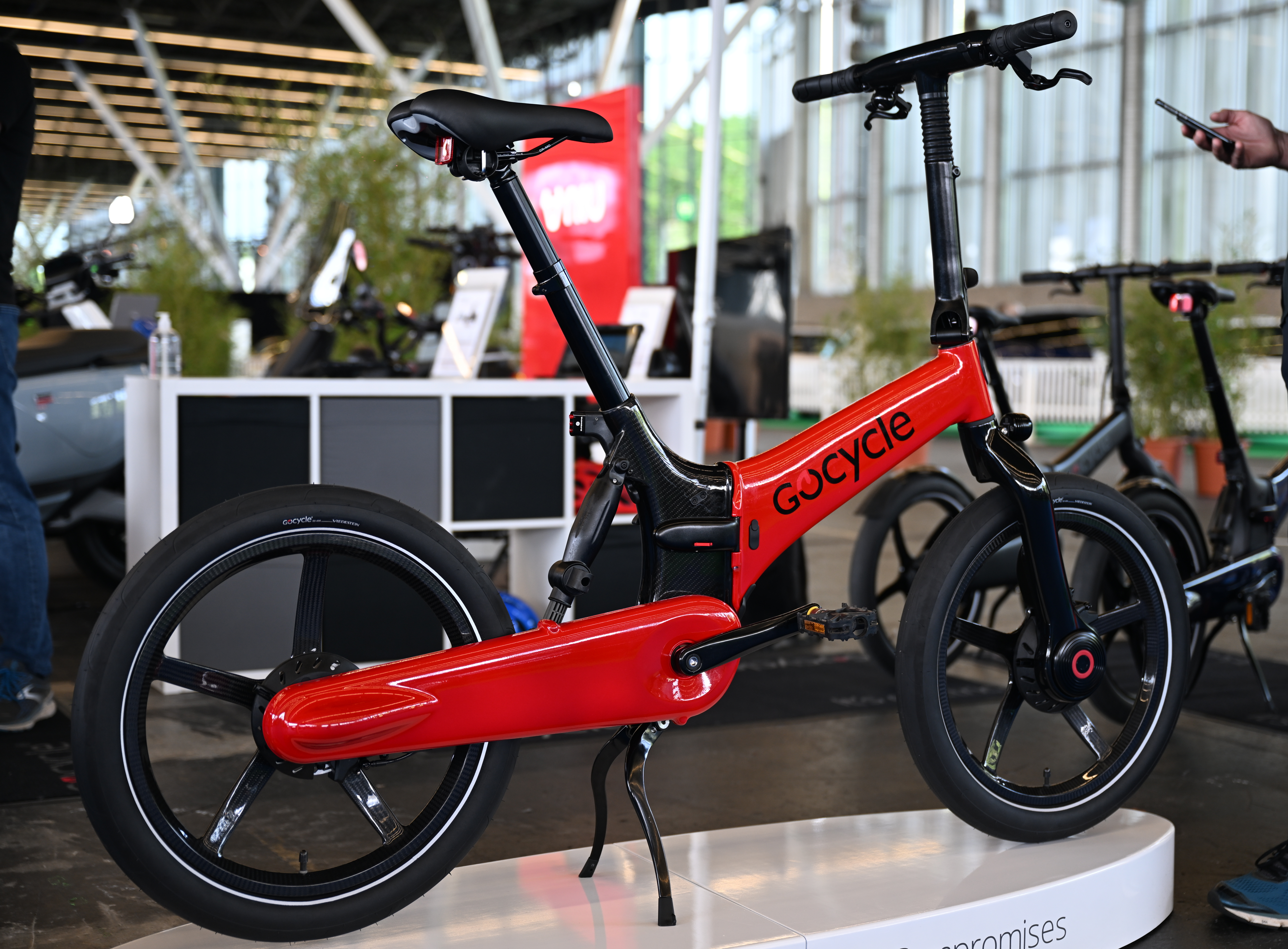
GoCycle electric bicycle on display at Fully Charged in 2022

Gocycle is an electric bicycle manufactured by Karbon Kinetics Limited, a company founded in 2002 by Richard Thorpe. Thorpe is an industrial designer who formerly worked at the racing car company McLaren. The Gocycle features quick-release wheels that are designed to be easily interchanged, along with a fully enclosed chain, gearing and cabling system. Frame and wheels are molded magnesium and a flat pack storage and transport system allows the bicycle to be disassembled and carried in a case. The electric motor is powered by a rechargeable lithium-ion battery.

== Products ==
The Gocycle G1 launched in Europe and later that year the Gocycle G1 won the Best Electric Bike award at Eurobike 2009.

The Gocycle G2 launched at Eurobike 2012.

The Gocycle G3 launched in Europe in March 2016 with a daytime running lamp (DRL).

The all-rounder Gocycle GS model was funded using Kickstarter in November 2016 and was officially launched in October 2017.

The Gocycle GX, which debuted at the start of 2019, is capable of being folded and stowed in under 10 seconds.

The GXi was introduced in 2020.

The G4 and G4i models were introduced in 2021.

== See also ==
- List of electric bicycle brands and manufacturers
- Outline of cycling
