= Masi Bicycles =

Bicycle manufacturer

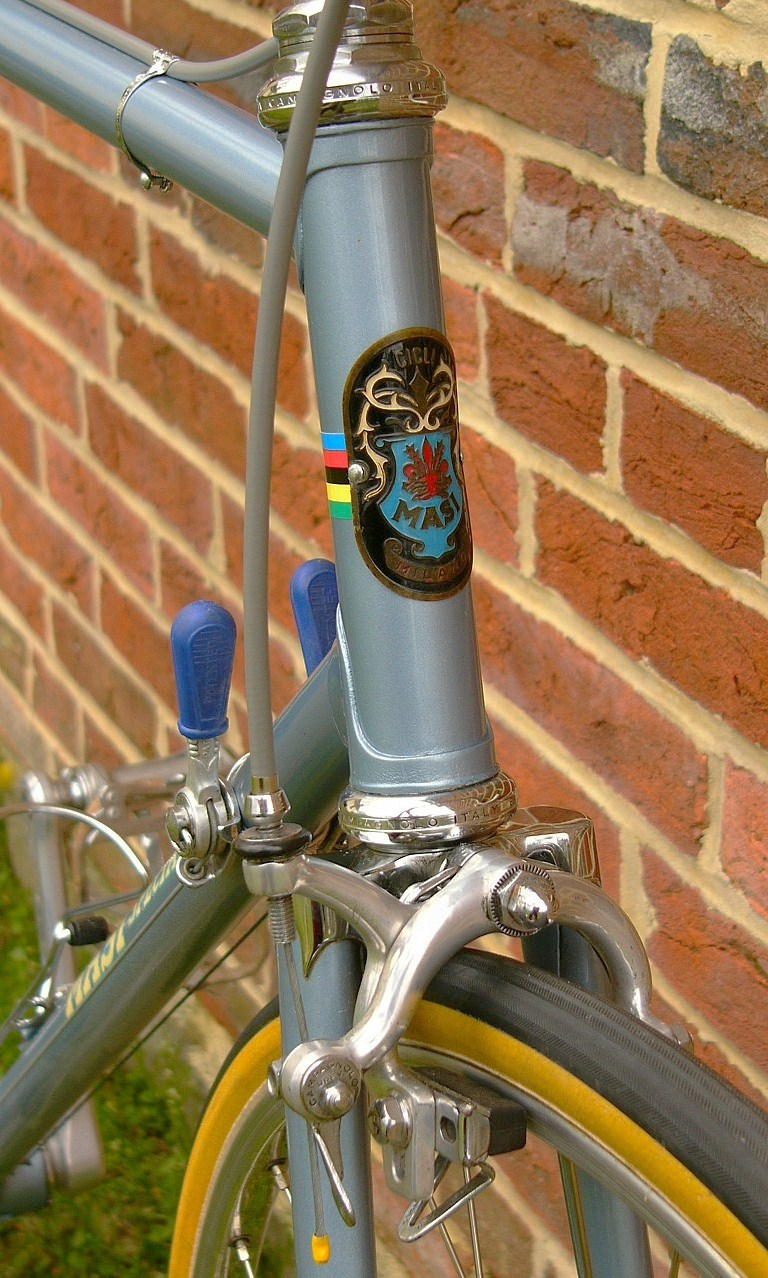

Masi Bicycles is a manufacturer of road, track, cyclocross and commuter bicycles based in Vista, California, United States.

== History ==
Faliero Masi commenced making bicycle frames at the Velodromo Vigorelli in Milan in the 1950s, after a career as a semi-professional racer and team mechanic. In 1973 his son Alberto took over the Vigorelli shop. Faliero and two assistants went to the US and began production at a new facility in Carlsbad, California after selling the "Cicli Masi" name and trademark to an American businessman, Roland Sahm.

Later, Faliero returned to Italy. Disputes over volume production caused a break in relations between Masi and the US Masi investors. The ownership of the US trademark remained with the US operation, so the Masi family were unable to sell bikes in the US under their own name. This was despite Faliero Masi having brought over master builder Mario Confente from Italy to help establish the company's U.S. operations, which came to be regarded as producing even finer bicycles than its Italian counterpart.

Alberto Masi would later release bikes into the US under the "Milano 3V" name.

The U.S. rights to the Masi name and logo are now owned by Haro Bikes.

Many well-known and successful professional cyclists rode Masi bikes, such as Antonio Maspes, Fausto Coppi, Felice Gimondi, Jacques Anquetil and Eddy Merckx.

== In popular culture ==
Dave Stoller, the lead character in the Oscar-winning movie Breaking Away (1979), rides a Masi bicycle. He is played by Dennis Christopher.
