= Ideal Bikes =

Greek bicycle manufacturer

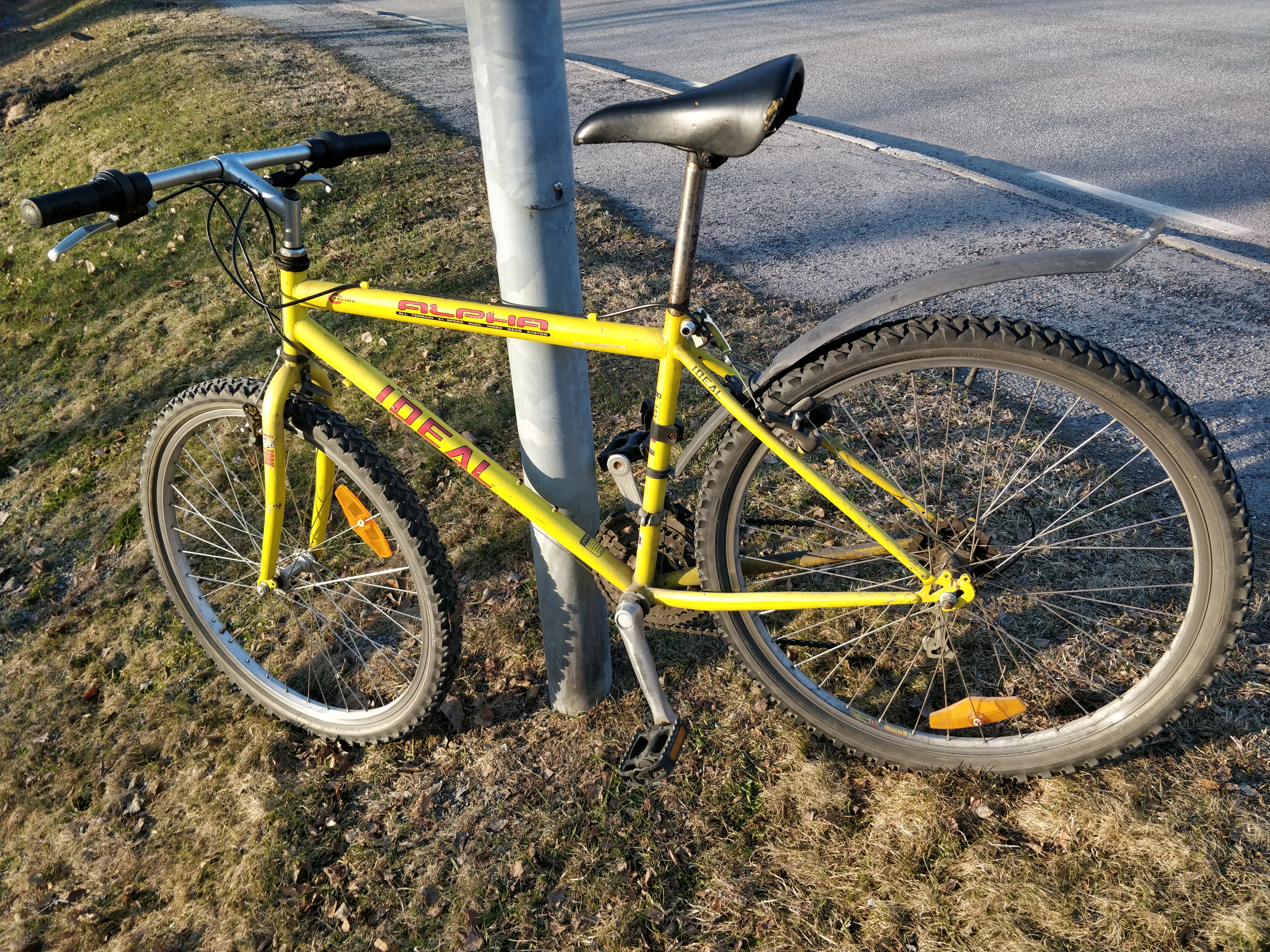
Older MTB model "Alpha"

Ideal Bikes is a Greek bicycle manufacturer located in Agios Vassileios, near Patras. With over 190,000 bicycles a year, it is one of the largest producers in Europe.

== History ==
The company Maniatopoulos Bros S.A. was founded in Patras in 1926, originally as an importer of bicycles and (later) motorbikes. In 1987 it was renamed Nikos Maniatopoulos S.A. The brand Ideal is used since 1977; in 1991 production moved to its present modern factory in Agios Vassileios, while an aggressive export campaign established the brand in over 20 countries. The company maintains very advanced Design, Development and production technology infrastructure and Ideal Bikes is an extremely popular brand, especially in Europe, with a network of distributors throughout the continent. Other branches of the Maniatopoulos family have been involved in the automotive sector, like the owners of MAVA (the Renault importer in Greece, who designed and produced the MAVA-Renault Farma automobile).

== Teams ==
In its first year as a professional team the Team Volksbank started as Volksbank-Ideal. The Swiss/Latvian team Rietumu Bank-Riga is sponsored by Ideal and begun as Rietumu Bank-Riga-Ideal. Several mountain-bike teams have won international titles on Ideal bikes:
