= TerraTrike =

Manufacturer	WizWheelz Inc.
Cycle line	recumbent tadpole tricycles
Introduced	1997
Status	In production
Models	5
Website	www.terratrike.com

TerraTrike is a brand of recumbent tadpole tricycles manufactured by WizWheelz Inc. TerraTrike is based in Grand Rapids, Michigan USA. TerraTrike's 2013 product line consisted of five models: Rover, Rambler, Tour II, Sportster, and Tandem Pro. Designed for adults, each model has three to five different component levels to meet each rider's needs.

== History ==
Jack Wiswell and Wayne Oom first discussed the concept of an adult tricycle that Jack had doodled on a napkin at a Christmas party in 1995. Along with former partner Peter Dolan each invested $1,000 from their savings to get things rolling. Their first trike was released in March 1997. In 2005 they hired Mike Kessenich as Production Manager to handle the complexity of their production needs. Their marketing needs were met in 2007 after hiring Jeff Yonker who pushed the business into social media and numerous other non-cycling publications.

== Models ==
Rover – The Rover is TerraTrike's entry-level model and is made of hi-ten steel. Introduced in 2009, it was the first of its kind with a higher seat, ease of operation and a low cost. It uses an internal hub and comes in three-speed, eight-speed or auto shifting variable speed. It won Bentrider's "Trike of the Year" in 2011 when it was introduced and claims to have "introduced more people to triking than any other recumbent trike on the market". In 2013, an automatic shifting model using a NuVinci 360 drive named the Rover Auto NuVinci was introduced at their annual Dealer Day expo.

Rambler – The Rambler was introduced in spring of 2011 and is a more featured version of the Rover. It is made from chromoly steel and comes in an eight-speed internal hub, a 24- or a 27-speed version.

Traveler – On October 23, 2013 TerraTrike released their new folding model named the Traveler at their annual Dealer Day expo.

Tour II – The Tour II is the combination of the Tour and the popular Cruiser models. It is made from chromoly steel and features linkage steering, a lower profile and heavy duty components designed around the touring rider.

Sportster – The Sportster model is the lightweight, high-performance model in TerraTrike's lineup. It is made from lightweight anodized aluminium and top-of-the-line components.

Tandem Pro – The Tandem Pro is a two-person tandem trike. It made of chromoly steel, features direct steering, 27 speeds, a quick coupler for transporting and an optional independent pedaling system.

Charge – Introduced in 2023, the Charge model is an e-assist tricycle with mechanical disk brakes and an 8-speed drivetrain.

== Achievements ==
- May 31, 2013 – It was announced that CEO Jack Wiswell and CFO Wayne Oom are finalists for the Ernst & Young Entrepreneur of the Year 2013 Award in Michigan and Northwest Ohio.
- March 26, 2013 – TerraTrike was featured on the FOX comedy show Raising Hope episode "Squeak Means Squeak"
- December 3, 2012 – TerraTrike featured on CNN iReport
- November 25, 2012 – Racing with ALS
- May 11, 2012 – Bike designed on napkin turning into big hit for Kentwood company
- May 24, 2011 – Late night host Jimmy Fallon races Queen Latifah in studio on TerraTrikes
- June 20, 2008 – TerraTrike featured on CNN iReport
