= Trinx Bikes =

Chinese Bicycle Brand

- Type: Private
- Industry: Bicycles and related products
- Founded: 1992
- Headquarters: Guangzhou, China
- Website: www.trinx.com

Trinx Bikes (also Trinx Bicycles and Trinx accessories) is a Chinese brand of bicycles and related products manufactured by Guangzhou Trinity Cycles Co., Ltd. Its headquarters is in Guangzhou, China. Trinx bicycles have assembly factories in India, Russia, Iran, and Philippines. Its products are sold in more than 60 countries.

== History ==
The company was founded in 1990. It is active in research and development and operates its own carbon fiber plant.

== First Iranian UCI team ==
Trinx Bikes, together with bike company KTM and the Fastos Group, formed the first Iranian Union Cycliste Internationale (UCI) Cycling Team which officially represents the Iranian Republic in international cycling competitions and other certified races. The team is nominally divided between KTM and Trinx, under cycling coach Harry Hendriks. Hendriks coached two-time Belgian Cross Country champion Mels Fabrice. The team competed in the Asian Championships in early 2016 to qualify directly for the 2016 Summer Olympics.

== Sponsored events ==
=== "On Rocky Roads" World Cycling Tour ===
Trinx sponsors "On Rocky Roads", a worldwide cycling tour. On Rocky Roads started in 2005 in Dublin and, over the years, cycled through Ireland, Singapore, Malaysia and Australia using Trinx A380 Bicycles.

==== Philippines ====
In 2015, Trinx held one of the largest cycling events in the Philippines, drawing more than 5,000 participants. The event was held with the Government of the Philippines to support rebuilding St. James Church, one of the oldest churches in Bulacan, and to sponsor a local festival in the country.

== Endorsements ==
=== Philippines ===
- 2013–present: Bernadette Mae Aguirre, Miss Earth Philippines Eco-Tourism 2013
- 2015–present: Jennylyn Mercado, Triathlete, FHM Philippines' Sexiest Woman 2015

== Recognition ==
=== Trinx Worldwide ===
- Excellent Enterprise for Overseas Investments, P.R.C.
- China Quality Certification Centre (CQC)
- Guangdong Famous Trademark
- Top 500 Manufacturing Corporations, P.R.C.
- International Standards Office (ISO) 9001:2008
- International Certification Network (IQNet)
- 2015: International Forum (iF) Award for Product Design

=== Trinx Cycling Team ===
- 2015: 3rd place at the Salcanto Bitlis Mountain Bike Cup held in Turkey
- 2015: Champion at the Cross Country (XCO) Tournament of Iranian National Federation
