= Gepida =

Hungarian bicycle manufacturer

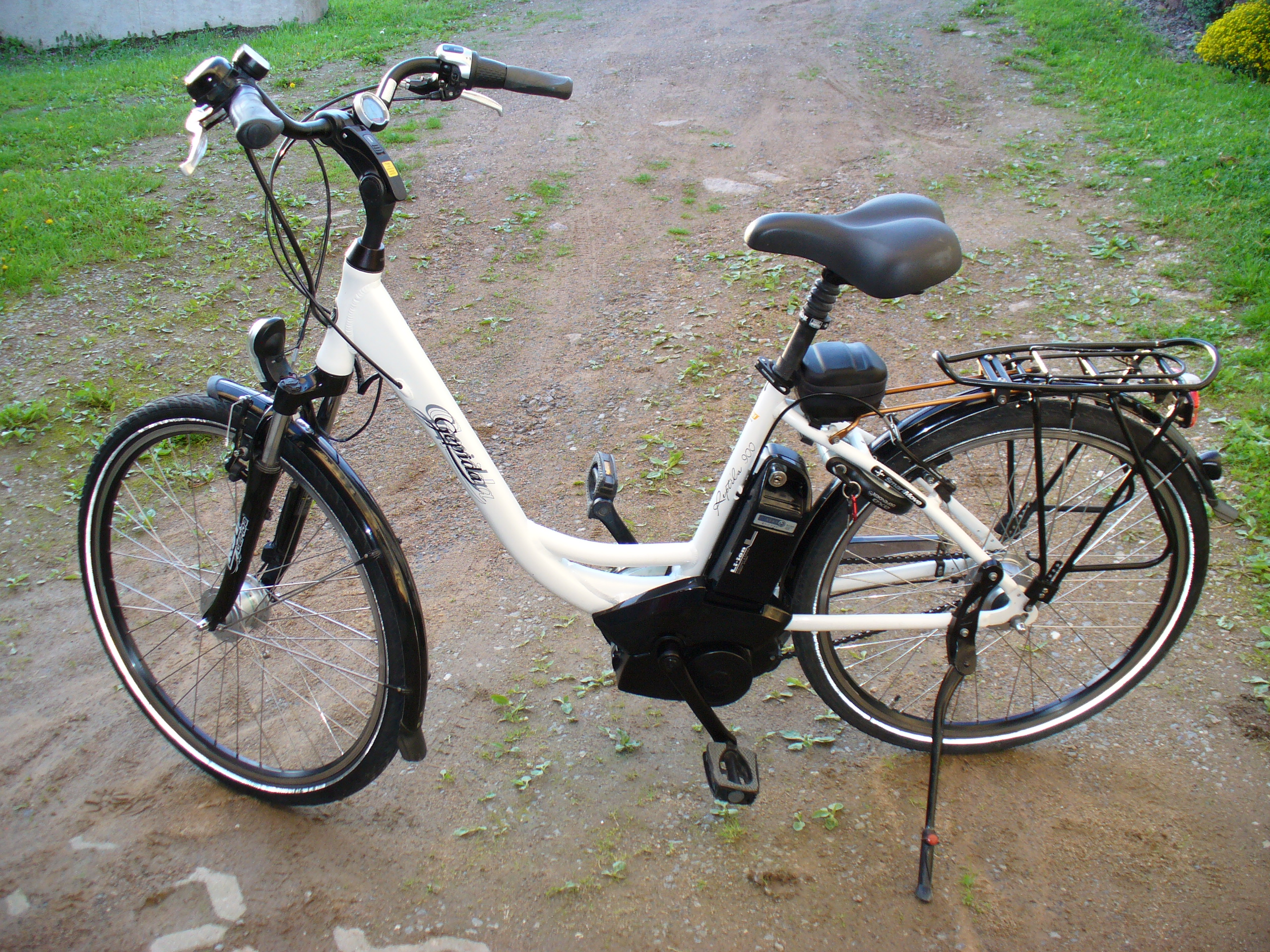
A Gepida bicycle

Gepida is a Hungarian manufacturer of bicycles established in 1996. It takes its name from the Gepids, an East Germanic tribe.

Among its products are electric bicycles, including the Gepida Reptila 1000, released in Autumn 2010. Its bicycles have been reviewed by various organisations and publications.

== History ==
The history of Olimpia Kft., the distributor of Gepida bikes, began in 1993 in a small garage. At first, bicycles were imported from Italy. In 1998, they participated in the Cologne World Expo. Subsequently, Gepida was bought by Olimpia Kft. This was in Budapest XVI district, from where the company operates to this day. By the end of the millennium, the palette had been expanded, and the brand started to spread abroad. In 2008, the first electric bicycle was launched. Nowadays, it is recognized in Hungary and Europe. The popularity of the brand is also reflected in the growing presence of Gepida bikes in the more famous bicycle races. The popularity of bicycles is further enhanced by the manufacturer's lifelong warranty on the bicycle frame.

On 18 November 2025, the company ceased all operations and entered liquidation.
