= Ribble Cycles =

British bicycle manufacturer

- Industry: Bicycles
- Founded: 1897
- Headquarters: Preston, Lancashire, England
- Area served: Worldwide
- Products: Bicycles and accessories
- Website: www.ribblecycles.co.uk

Ribble Cycles is a British bicycle manufacturer and retailer based in Preston, Lancashire. The company traces its origins to 1897, when a frame-building workshop was established on Water Lane (later Watery Lane) near the River Ribble. It has operated in the cycling industry for more than a century, producing and supplying bicycles in various categories.

== History ==
Ribble began as a small workshop producing steel bicycle frames during the period when safety bicycles became widely adopted. During the mid-20th century the firm was owned by Hughie Sandiford. In the 1980s the business expanded its sales channels to include mail order.

In November 2015 Ribble was acquired by True Capital Limited, an investment firm with interests in retail businesses. Coverage in the Lancashire Evening Post in 2021 described the company as one of the UK's larger online bicycle retailers.

== Operations ==
Ribble sells bicycles and related products primarily through its website and a small number of showrooms. According to company statements, its bicycles are designed in-house and assembled in the UK.

Financial information reported in 2021 indicated a turnover of £22.8 million and total assets of £11.14 million.

== Products ==
Ribble produces bicycles across several categories, including road, gravel, electric and hybrid models. In 2021 the company opened a showroom in Clitheroe that featured interactive displays relating to its product range. Coverage in VELOUK in 2025 reported on new alloy models added to the company's line-up.

== Sponsorship ==
Ribble has taken part in competitive cycling activities. In 2001 it sponsored the cycling team Ribble Pro Vision during the Premier Calendar series.
