= Time (bicycle company) =

French bicycle manufacturer

Time Sport
- Company type: Private
- Industry: Bicycles
- Founded: 1987
- Founder: Roland Cattin
- Headquarters: Little Rock, Arkansas & Chicago, USA
- Key people: Martial Trigeaud (CCG Co-CEO) & Tony Karklins (CCG Co-CEO); Ken Lousberg (SRAM CEO)
- Products: Bicycle Frames, Road & MTB Pedals and Related Components
- Number of employees: 60-80
- Parent: Bought by Skis Rossignol in 2016; Bicycle manufacturing bought by Cardinal Cycling Group and pedals bought by SRAM, 2021
- Website: https://www.timebicycles.com/; https://www.sram.com/en/time-sport

Time (previously known as: Time Sport) (stylized as TIME) is a manufacturer of pedals and bicycles.

== History ==
Time was founded in 1987 by Roland Cattin.

Time products became popular in the early 1990s, through sponsorship of Pedro Delgado in 1988, then multiple Tour de France winner Greg LeMond in his 1989 Tour de France victory, followed by multiple Tour de France winner Miguel Indurain.

== Sponsorship ==
Time has sponsored several professional cycling teams, most recently ProTour teams Quick Step-Innergetic, Cofidis and Bouygues Telecom. Several other professionals and teams use Time shoes and/or pedals, including Saunier-Duval, Ag2r, and 2008 Beijing Olympic mountain biking gold medalist Julien Absalon.

Pedro Delgado used Time clipless pedals and Time cycling shoes in the 1988 Tour de France and Greg LeMond won the Tour the following year wearing Time Equipe cycling shoes.

During the 2004 Tour de France, Thomas Voeckler used a Time VXRS bicycle with Time Impact pedals.

Tom Boonen, the 2005 Road Race World Champion, used Time bikes while he was with Quick Step-Innergetic. His successful 2005 season included the Tour of Flanders, Paris–Roubaix, the Tour of Belgium and the 2005 World Road Race Championships in Madrid, Spain. The following season, Time developed a special bike, the Time VXS, for Boonen to ride in the 2006 spring classics. The VXS is similar to the VXRS Ulteam, but is a little more compliant as a result of a longer wheelbase and the vectran fibres that are used in the Time manufactured carbon fibre.

In addition to Boonen's triumphs, Time has been ridden to more victories at the Olympics and World Championships. Italian rider Paolo Bettini rode Time bicycles during his gold medal-winning ride in the 2004 Athens Olympic Road Race and in the 2006 World Championship Road Race. Australian rider Michael Rogers rode a Time time-trial bike to victory in the 2003, 2004, and 2005 world championship time-trials.

The Giro d'Italia, la Vuelta a España, Paris–Roubaix, the Olympic games, World Championship and the Tour de France (10 Times winner) have been won using Time products.

In 2021, after Cardinal Cycling Group bought Time bicycles and SRAM bought Time pedals, the first teams to be sponsored were :

- Le Stade Rochelais Charente Maritime women cycling for frames
- Team Absolut Absalon for MTB pedals
- Rally UHC and SD Worx for road pedals

Besides cycling, Time has also sponsored teams and Olympic athletes such as:

- Martin Fourcade
- Teddy Rinner
- Poissy Triathlon (triathlon team of numerous international triathlon stars such as Andrea Hewitt, Dorian Coninx and Cassandre Beaugrand)
