= Jamis Bicycles =

American bicycle company

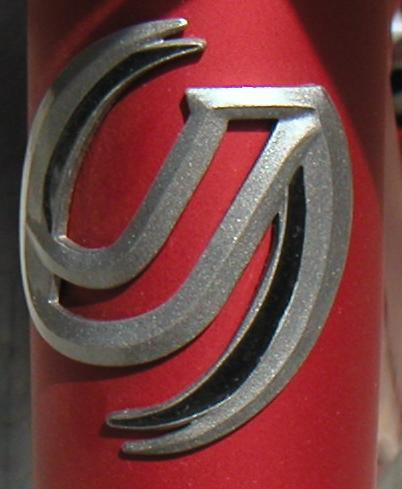
head badge

Jamis Bicycles is an American distributor of bicycles, designed in the US and built in China and Taiwan. Jamis was acquired in 1990 by its parent company, G. Joannou Cycle Co. It is headed by Carine Joannou, chief executive of G. Joannou Cycles since taking over the family business when her father died in 1981.

== History ==
Jamis Bicycles was based in Tallahassee, Florida, taking its name from founder Ron Jamis, and originating from distributor East Coast Cycles. It introduced the Earth Cruiser, a beach cruiser, in 1979. In 1980, it made the Boss Cruiser, featuring a double-diamond frame and a Cheeks saddle. Jamis sold its Boss Explorer comfort bicycle in 1981, combining the Boss Cruiser and early mountain bikes. In 1983, Jamis launched the Dakota, Jamis Lightfoot and Jamis Roughneck. The first Jamis Dakar in 1985 was a custom-built, race-ready bicycle from the factory. The Dakar is still sold, although revised.

In 1988, Jamis introduced the Eclipse and Quest, their first road bikes. In 1991, Jamis introduced Coda and Tangier hybrid-style bikes with an upright seating position and 700c tires. Jamis sold the Dragon, its mountain bike, in 1993, featuring a fillet-welded, hand-polished tube frame, Rock Shox front suspension, XTR drivetrain and Ultegra Hubs. It made its first full-suspension bike in 1995.

The off-road Dragon and on-road Eclipse were the first American-made production bikes to have Reynolds 853 tubing on their frames. In 1998, Jamis made the Diablo, with a vacuum-resin, molded-carbon monocoque frame. Its Dakota mountain bike won the Bike of the Year Award from Mountain Biking. In 2000, Jamis won Bike of the Year again for bicycles under $800 with its Dakar Sport.

In 2013, Jamis bought Nirve Sports, a brand of cruiser bicycles.

== Awards ==
- 1998 - Bicycling Magazine's Editor's Choice award for innovative products - Jamis Diablo
- 1998 - Bicycling Magazine's Bike of the Year Award - Jamis Dakota
- 2000 - Mountain Biking magazine's Bike of the Year under $800 - Jamis Dakar Sport
- 2001 - Mountain Biking magazine's Bike of the Year $800 – $1500 - Jamis Dakar Comp
- 2004 - Bicycling Magazine as The Best Buy for a Comfort Road Bike - Jamis Coda Sport
- 2005 - Bicycling Magazine's Editor's Choice awards for Best Value Full-Suspension Mountain Bike - Jamis Dakar XLT
- 2005 - Bicycling Magazine's Editor's Choice awards for Best Value Enthusiast Road Bike - Jamis Quest
- 2006 - Bicycling Magazine's Editor's Choice Award as the Best Full Suspension Mountain Bike under $1000 - Jamis Diablo 7×7
- 2008 - Bicycling Magazine's Editor's Choice Award for Best Enthusiast Road Bike - Jamis Xenith Pro
- 2009 - Bicycling Magazine's Editor's Choice Award for Best Recreational Road Bike - Jamis Ventura Elite
- 2010 - Bicycling Magazine's Editor's Choice Award for Best Recreational Road Bike - Jamis Xenith Comp
- 2011 - Bicycling Magazine's Editor's Choice Award for Best Flat Bar Road Bike - Jamis Coda Sport
- 2013 - Bicycling Magazine's Editor's Choice Award for Best Recreational Road Bike - Jamis Icon Elite
- 2013 - Bicycling Magazine's Editor's Choice Award for Best Value 29" Hardtail Mountain Bike - Jamis Dragon 29 Sport
- 2014 - Bicycling Magazine's Editor's Choice Award for Best Recreational Road Bike - Jamis Icon Elite
- 2014 - Bicycling Magazine's Editor's Choice Award for Best Women's Flat Bar Road Bike - Jamis Allegro Elite Femme
