= Kent International =

American bicycle manufacturer

- Kent bicycle headbadge.
- Company type: Private
- Industry: Manufacturing, Bicycles
- Founded: 1909; 117 years ago, New York City
- Founder: Abraham Kamler
- Headquarters: Fairfield, New Jersey, U.S.
- Website: www.kent.bike

Kent International Inc is an American bicycle manufacturer based in Parsippany, New Jersey. It imports and distributes bicycles and bicycle accessories worldwide.

== History ==
Kent dates back to the early 1900s when Abraham Kamler, an immigrant to the United States, began restoring bicycles in New York City. Kamler opened his own bike shop on the Lower East Side in 1909 and later moved to a larger location in Newark, New Jersey.

The current President's father started his own company called Philkam Cycle in 1947, supplying bikes and parts to stores all over the Eastern United States. Philkam Cycle changed its name in 1958 to Kent International. In 1979 it began manufacturing bicycles in Kearny, New Jersey, but closed its factory and moved manufacturing overseas in 1990. It returned manufacturing to the United States in 2014, building a facility in Clarendon County, South Carolina. In May 2025 Kent announced the closure of the Clarendon facility laying off 64 employees.

== Products ==
Kent markets the following products generally through large chain-stores and internet marketers:

=== Licensed brands ===
Six Licensed Brands:

- Jeep Bikes which includes hybrid bikes and mountain bikes.
- GMC Bikes which includes road bikes and mountain bikes. (Not to be confused with the automotive manufacturer GMC)
- Razor Bikes which are higher-performance mountain bike style for children.
- Little Miss Match bicycles - "innovative designs" for girls bikes and helmets
- Cadillac - license expired.
- Genesis - exclusively sold at Walmart stores
- Margaritaville beach cruiser bicycles produced by Bicycle Corporation of America, a division of Kent International

=== Kent brand ===
Kent branded bikes

- Adult Bikes which includes all-terrain, cruiser, comfort and specialty models for adults.
- Kids Bikes which includes scooters in 10", 12", 14", 16", 18", 20", and 24" models.
- Specialty Bikes including tandems, adult tricycles, folders, portables, and other unique bicycles.

=== Accessories ===
- WeeRide Bikes which includes child and pet carriers, pushbikes, trailers, tag-a-longs etc.
