= Author (bicycles) =

Czech brand of bicycles

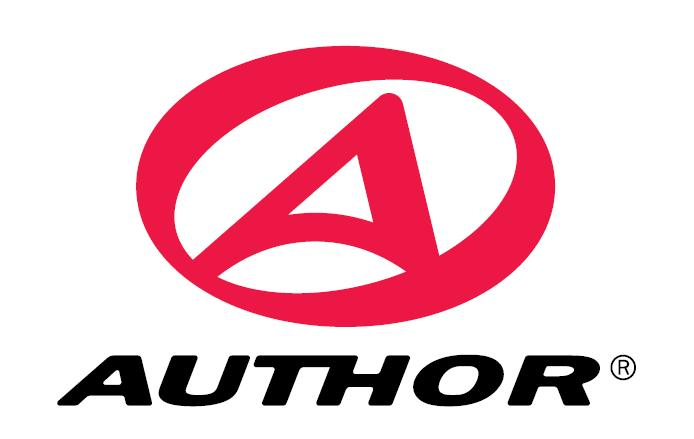
- Industry: Bicycles
- Headquarters: Prague, Czech Republic
- Products: Bicycle and Related Components
- Website: cz.author.eu

Author is a Czech brand of bicycles, bike accessories and sporting goods.

The brand was founded in 1993. The company manufactures bicycles in the following categories: road bikes, mountain bikes (cross-country, enduro, full suspension), cross-country bicycles, touring, freestyle (MTB, BMX), junior and women's (mountain bikes, cross-country). Author also manufactures e-bikes.

== Sport ==
Author supports the racing teams Voster ATS Team, Author Author Gang - 4cross/BMX (Michal Prokop, Luke Tammy), triathlon team Author Tufo Zlín (Peter Vabroušek) PSK Whirlpool - Author (Peter Benčík) and Alpine Pro - Author Team (Václav Ježek).
