= Calfee Design =

American bicycle frame company

- Industry: Sporting Goods, Consumer Goods, Manufacturing
- Founded: 1989; 37 years ago
- Founder: Craig Calfee
- Headquarters: California
- Area served: Worldwide
- Key people: Craig Calfee (Director)
- Products: Carbon fibre bicycle manufacturing, Bicycles, tandems, bamboo bikes, bicycle rims, bicycle wheels
- Services: Carbon fibre bicycle repair
- Website: calfeedesign.com

Calfee Design, headquartered in La Selva Beach, California, is a designer and manufacturer of carbon fiber bicycle frames. Directed by Craig Calfee, the firm employs about 20 people building carbon and bamboo bicycle frames as well as repairing carbon frames from other makers. Calfee built his first carbon fiber bike in 1987, the first all carbon fiber frameset to be raced in the Tour de France for Greg LeMond in 1991.

Calfee was awarded overall "Best Road Bike" and "Best Off-Road Bike" at the 2006 North American Handmade Bike Show, where it displayed a bamboo bicycle that went into retail production in 2005. The bamboo frame started as a stunt in 1996. Calfee Design also won best tandem award at the 2010 North American Handmade Bike Show with a carbon fiber 21 pound tandem Dragonfly bike. Calfee also works on other projects, including a motorcycle that converts to a gyrocopter, a roadable aircraft.

Calfee Design manufactures a bamboo bicycle. Craig Calfee started another business, Bamboosero, with the intention of providing employment opportunities in developing countries. Bamboosero establishes frame building business by providing training, tools, supply chain, and technical support. Bamboosero acted as a customer by purchasing frames from the fledgling (primarily African) businesses in order to resell the bamboo frames in North Americans and Europe. Bamboosero is now closed as the builders started their own brands, such as Booomers, Boogali and others.
