= Head badge =

Manufacturer's or brand logo affixed to the head tube of a bicycle

A head badge is a manufacturer's or brand logo affixed to the head tube of a bicycle.

Head badges may be made of metal or plastic, and they may be held in place with adhesive, screws, or rivets. Some are simply stickers, apparel, decals, or painted logos.

Head badges for a single brand may change from year to year or from model to model, as demonstrated by the variety (5) of Trek head badges pictured in the gallery below.

== Other uses ==
The term head badge has also been used to describe other logos:

- An emblem on the cowl of an aircraft.
- An emblem on a military uniform hat.

== Gallery ==
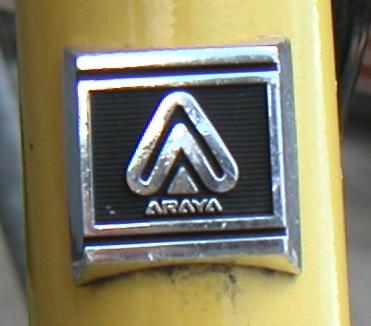
Araya

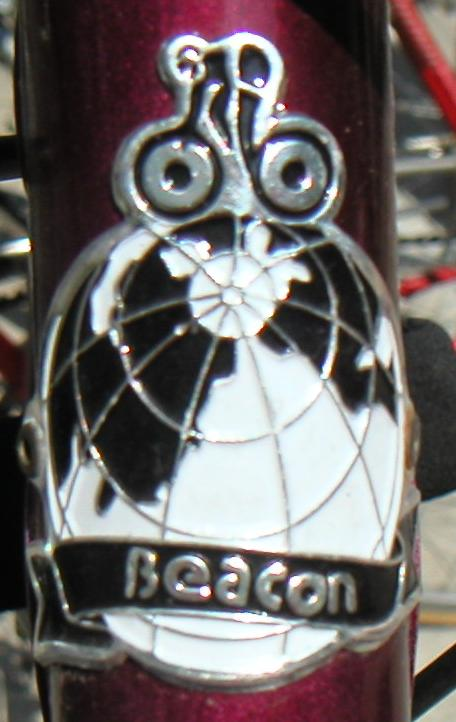
Beacon

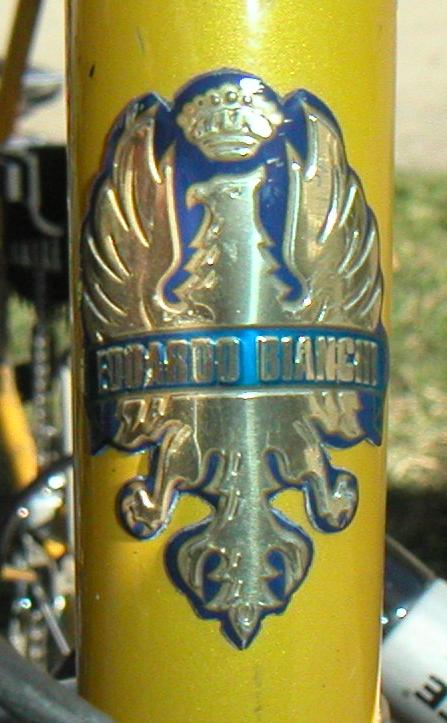
Bianchi

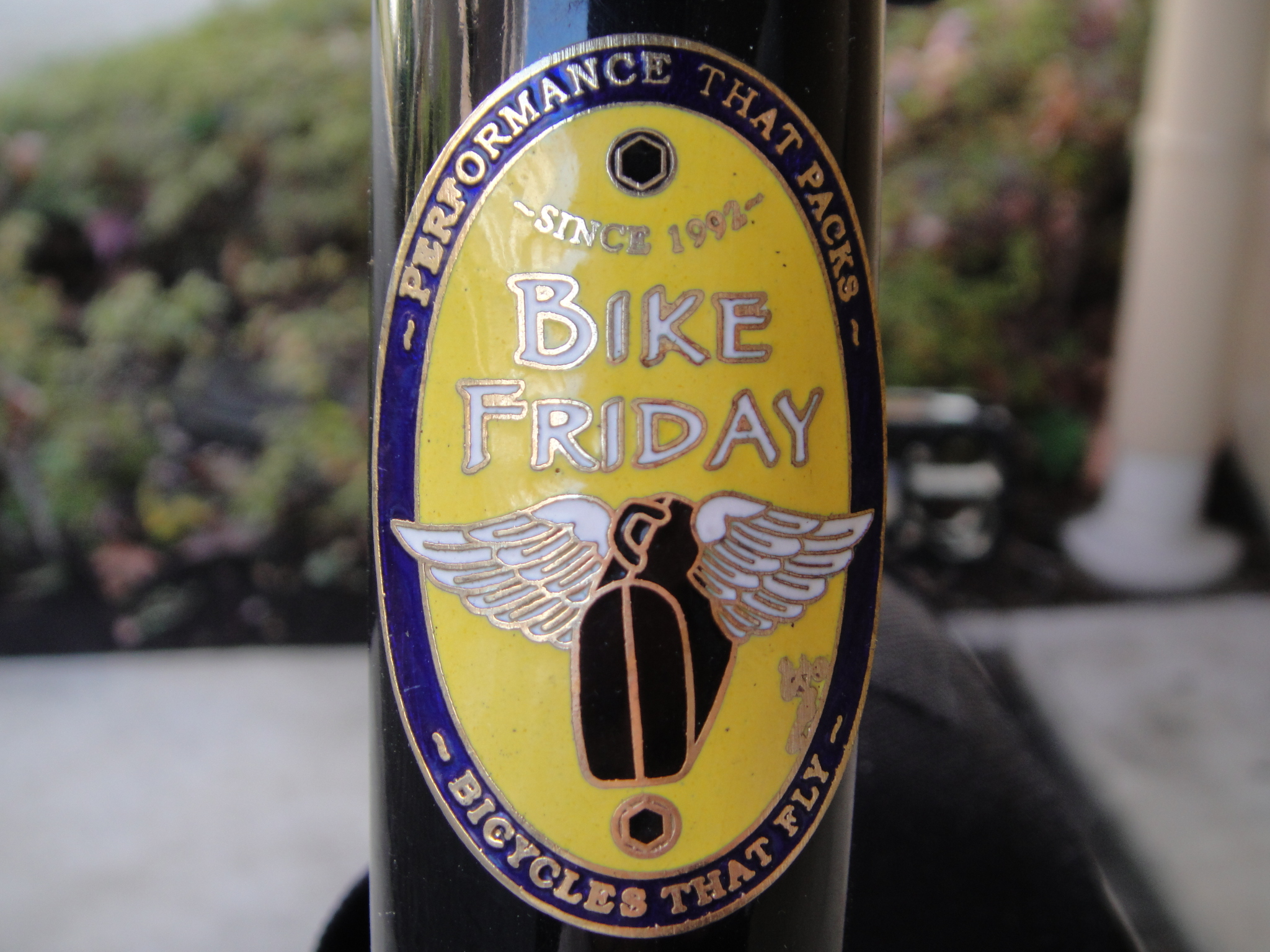
Bike Friday

Burley

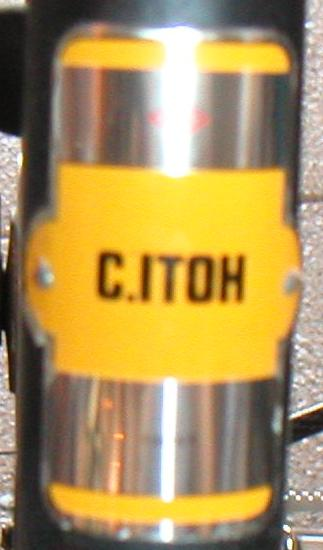
C. Itoh

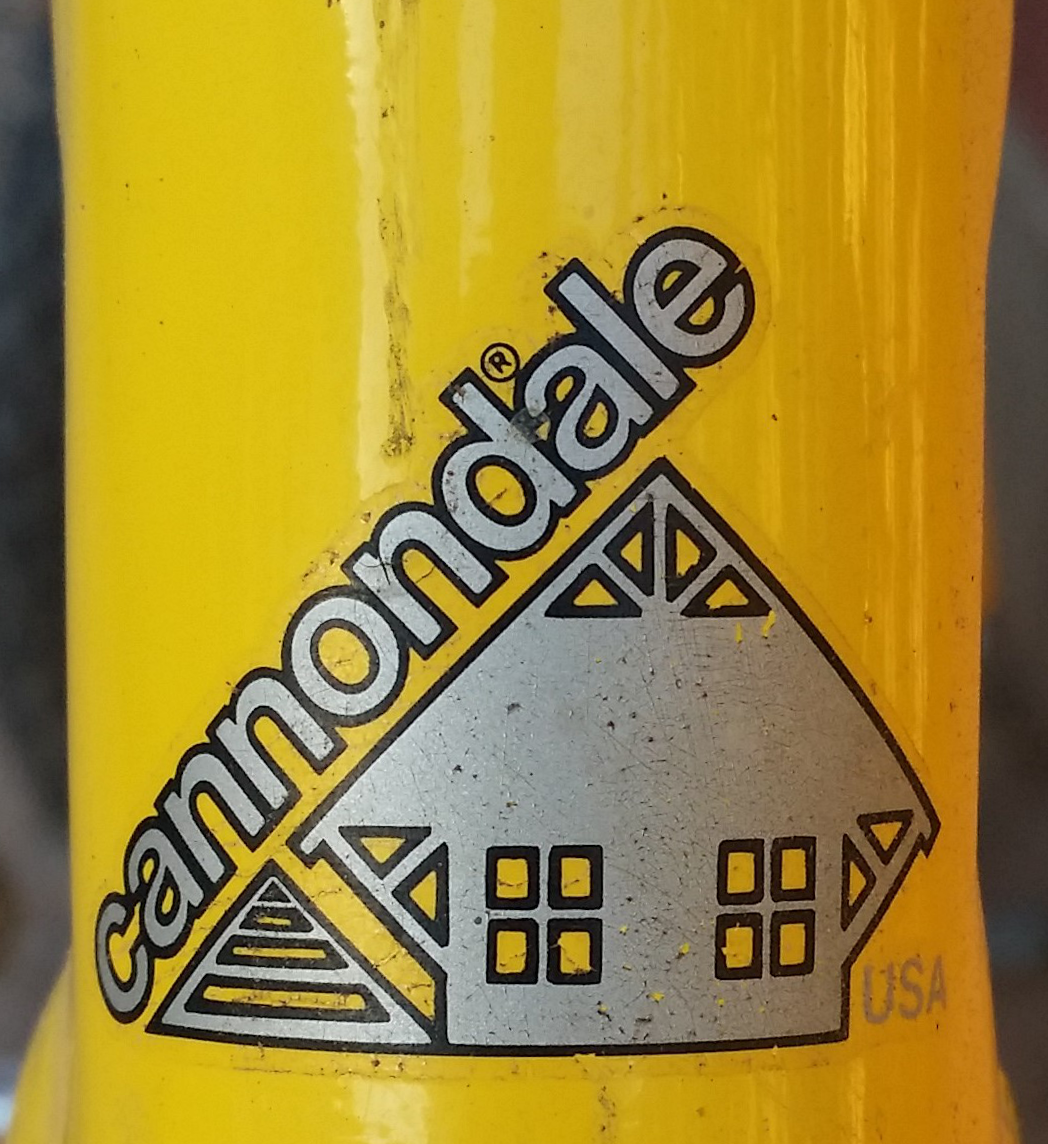
Cannondale

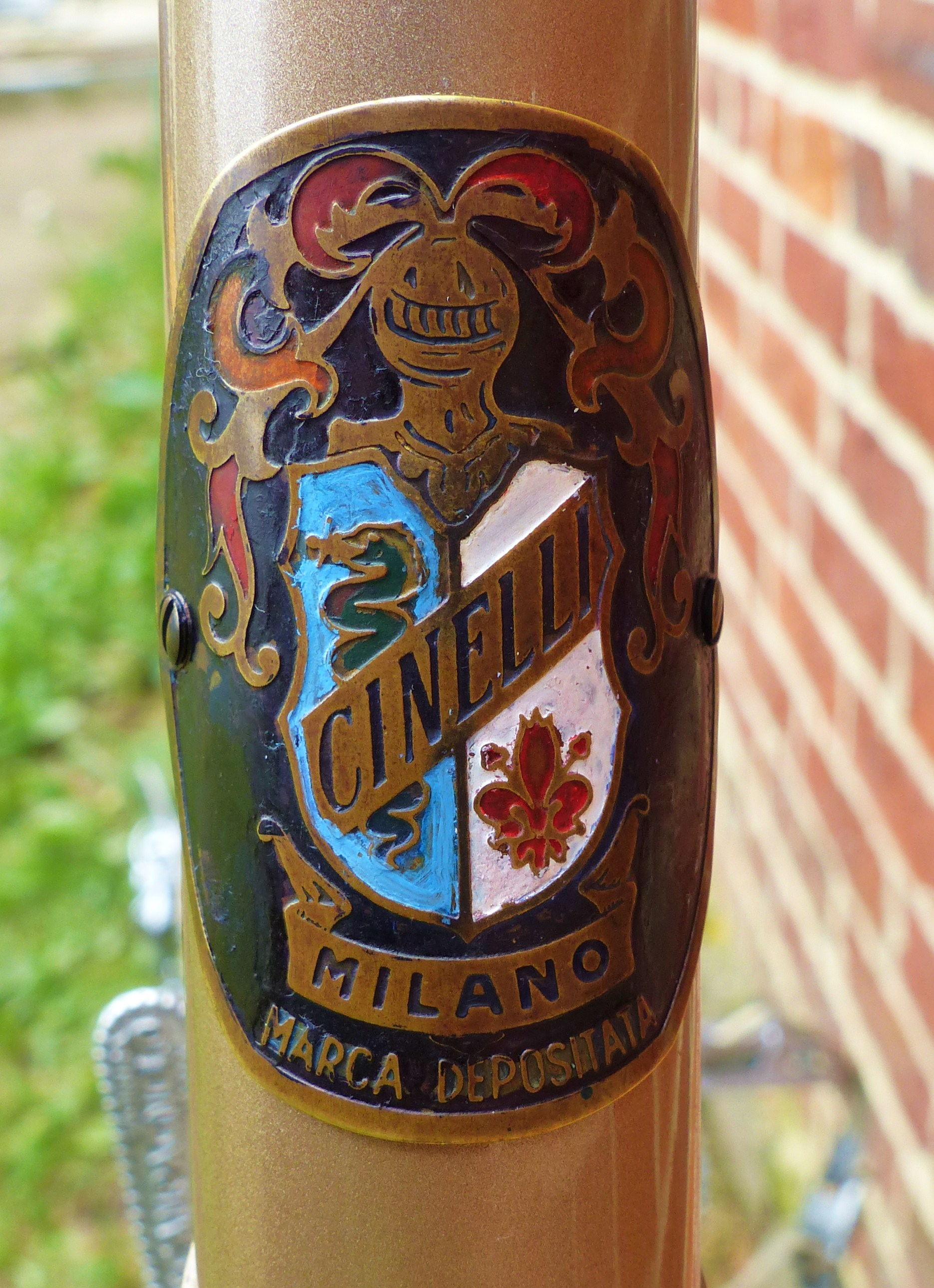
Cinelli
(1947–1979)

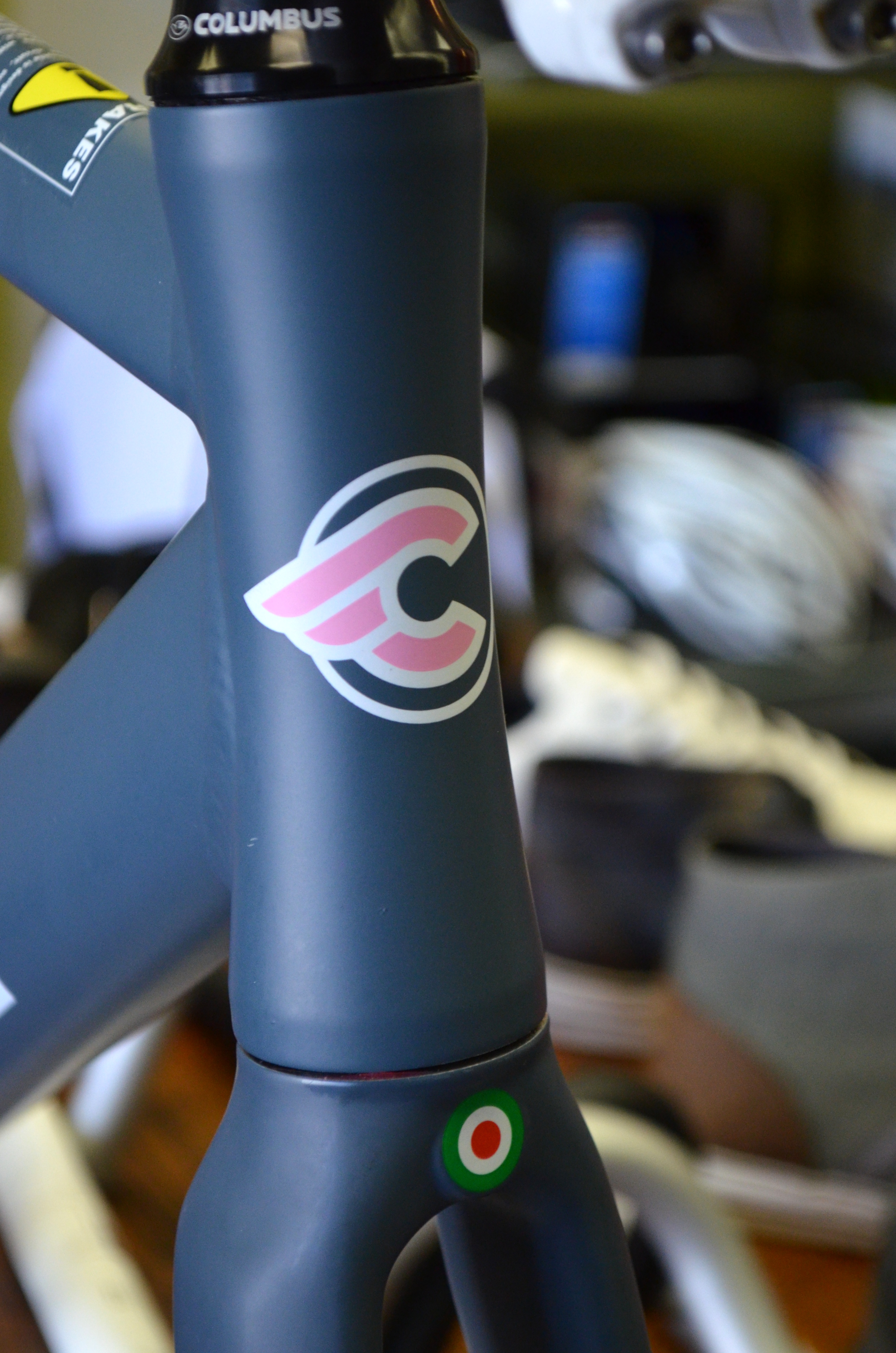
Cinelli
(1979–)

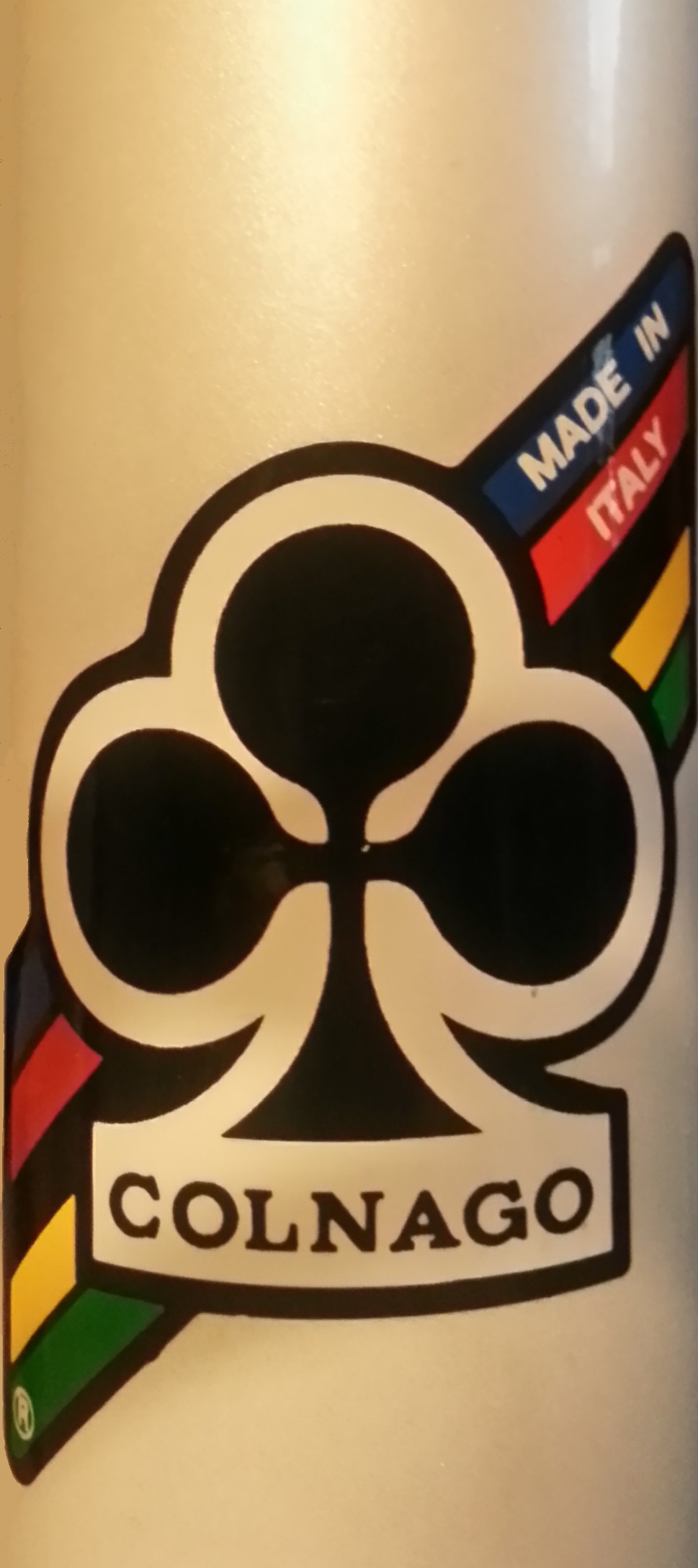
Colnago

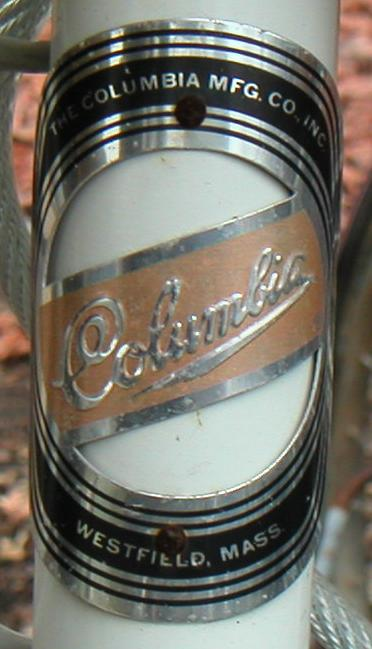
Columbia Bicycle

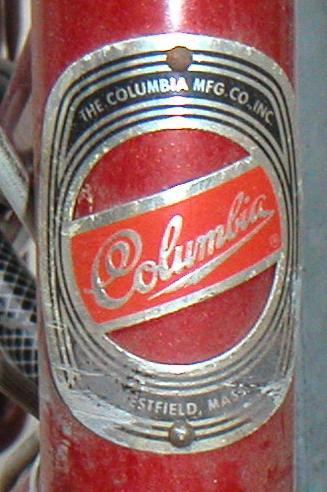
Columbia Bicycle

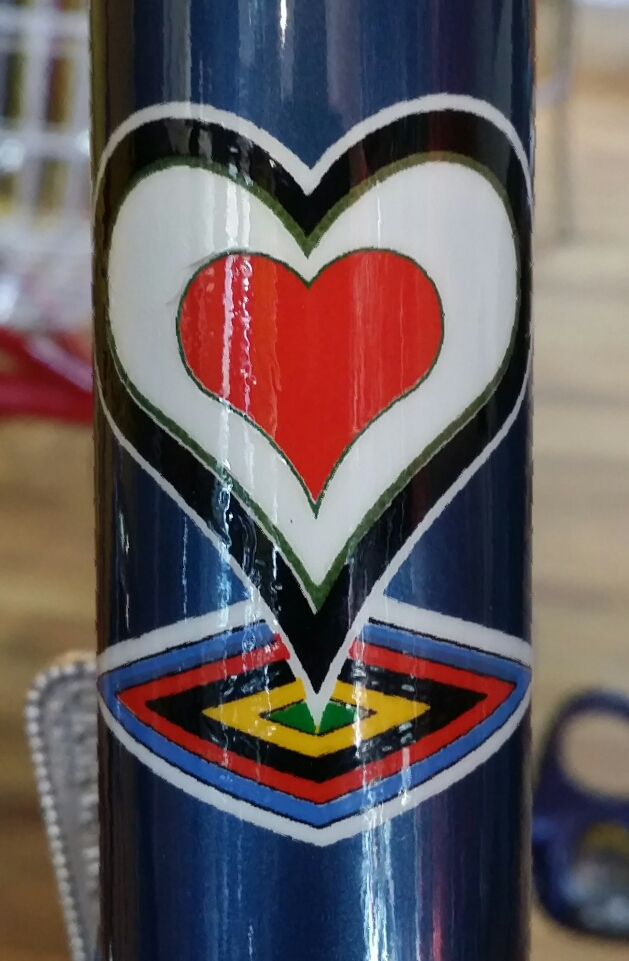
De Rosa

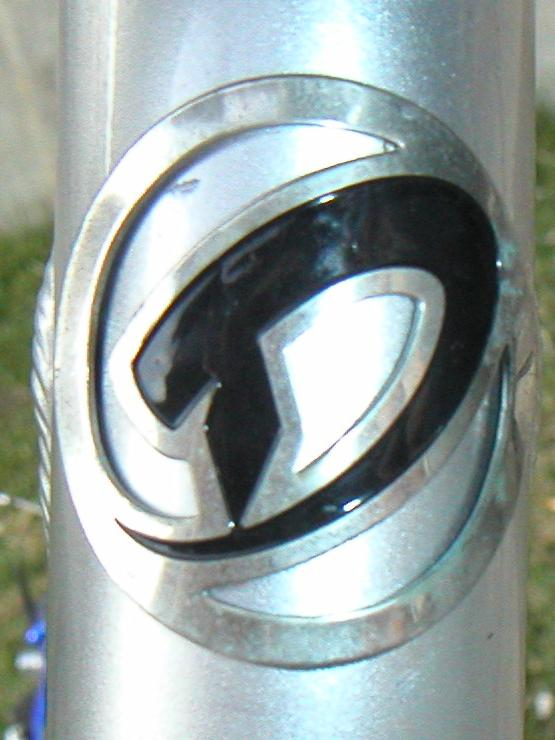
Diamondback

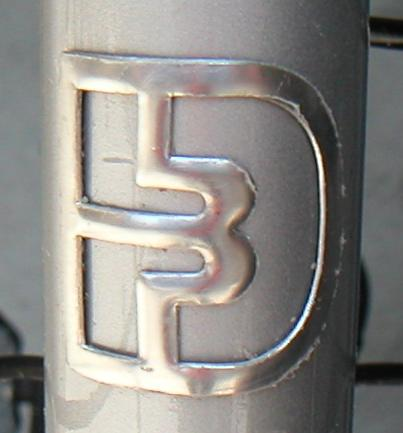
Diamondback

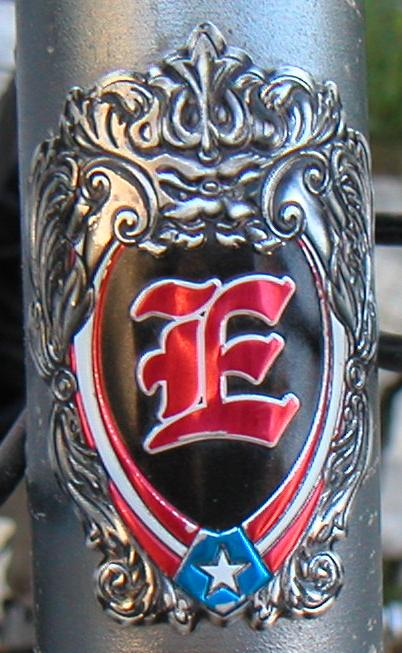
Ellsworth

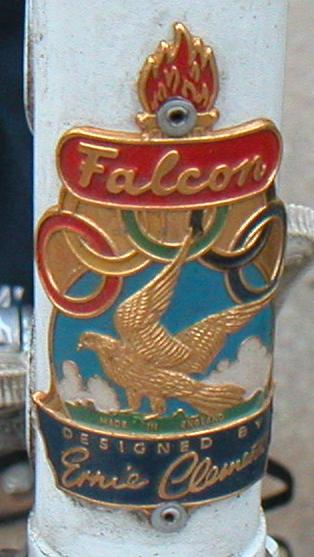
Falcon

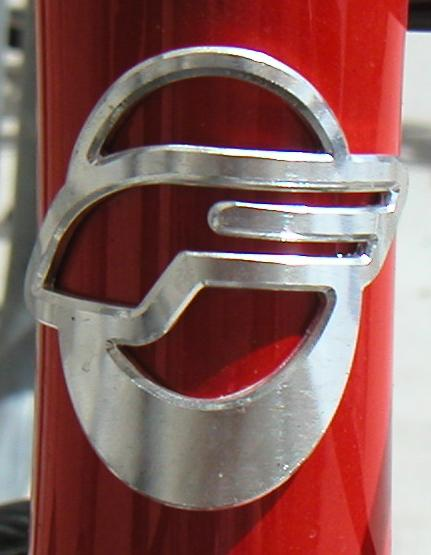
Felt

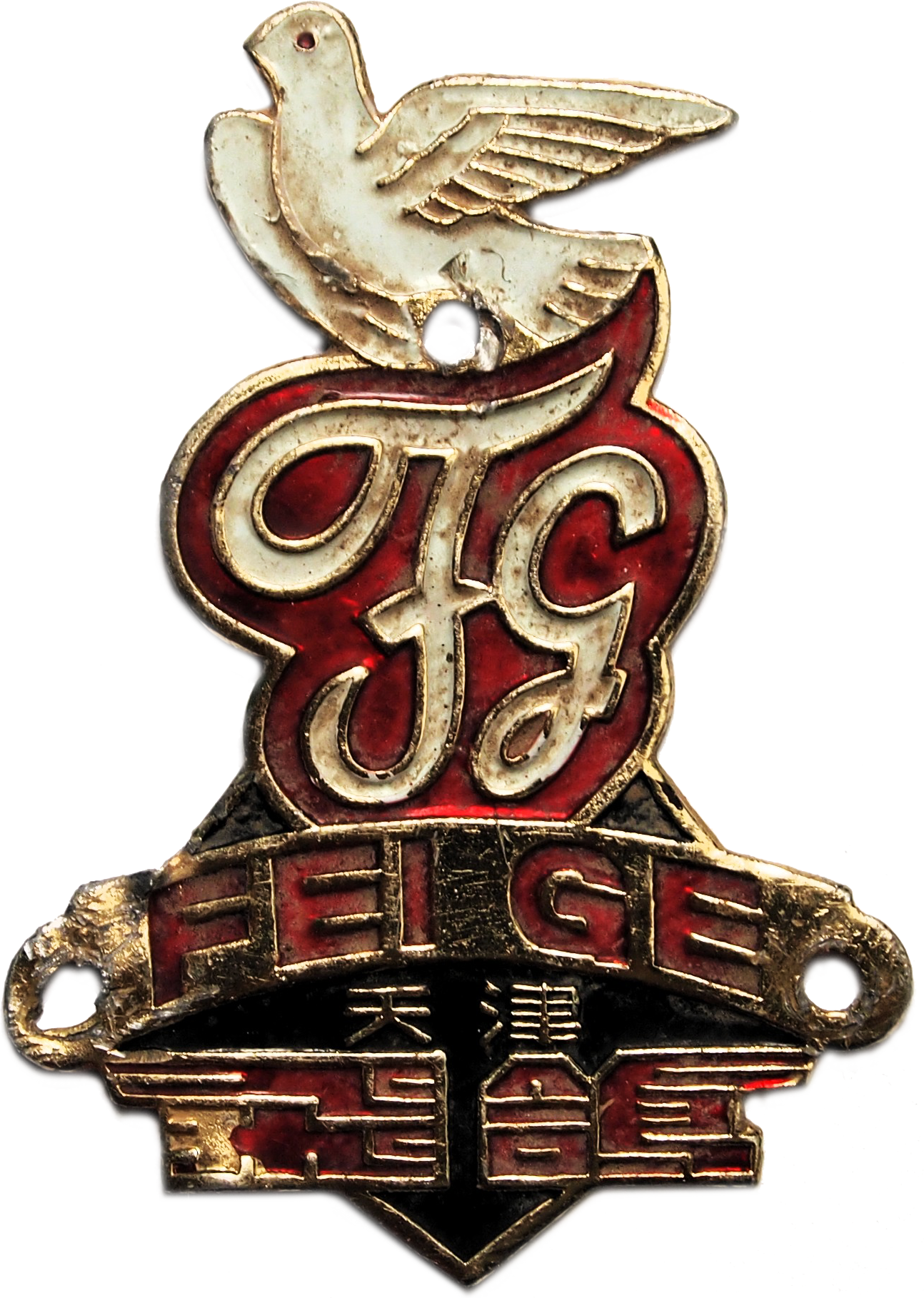
Flying Pigeon

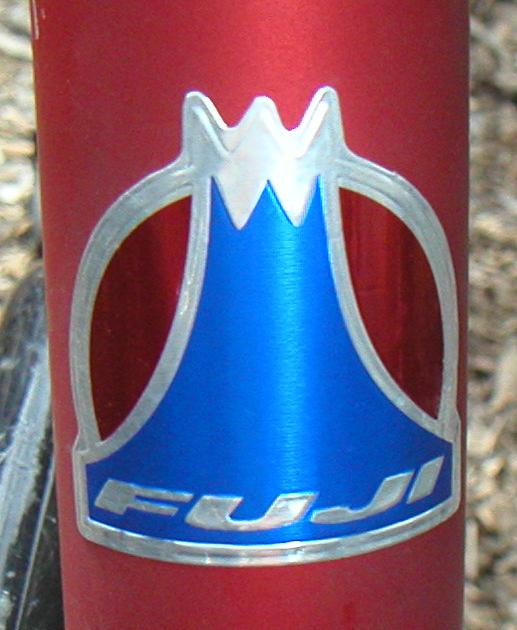
Fuji

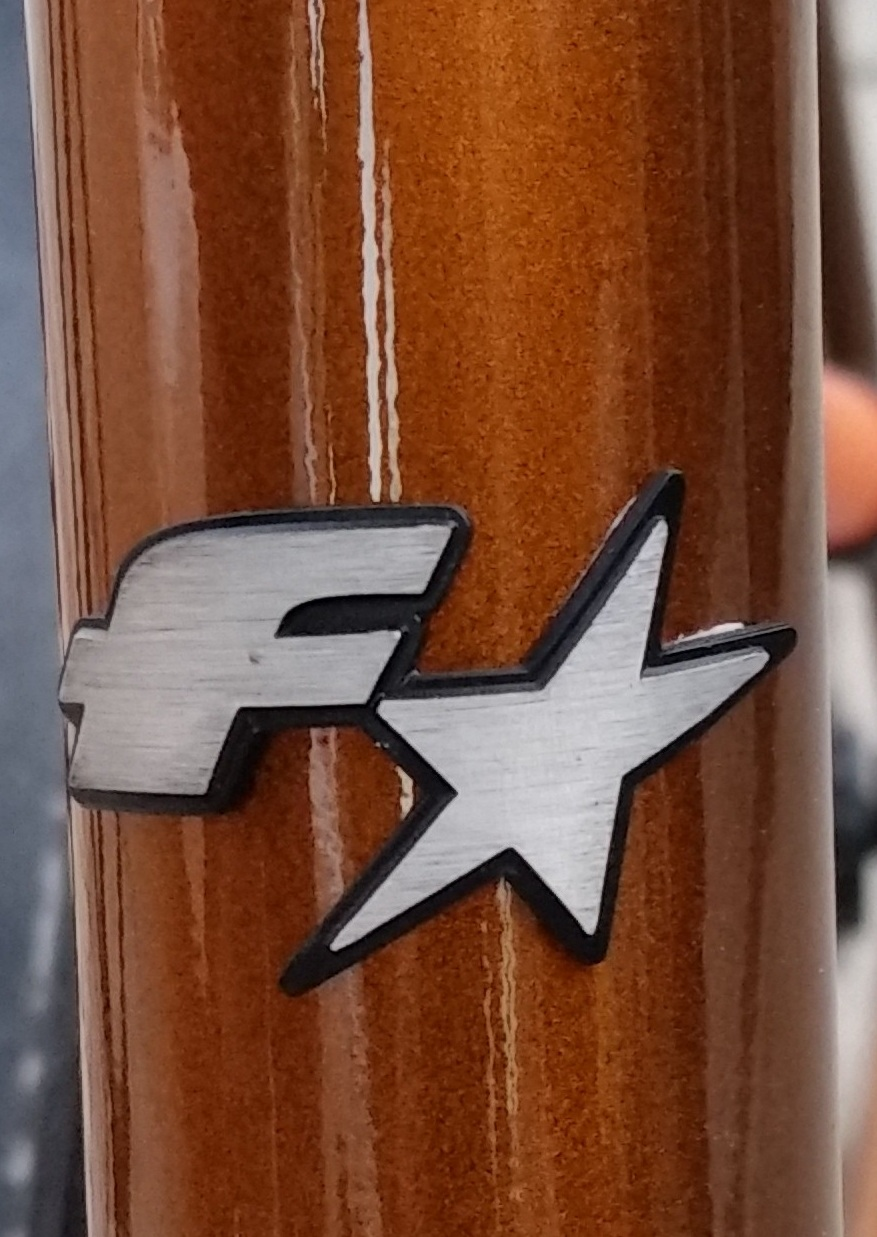
Fyxation

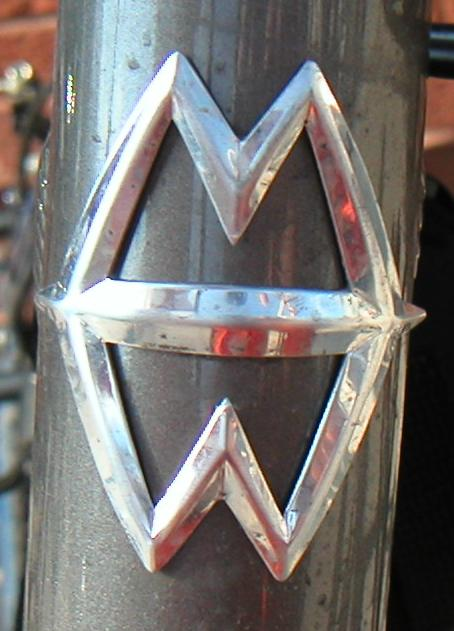
Gary Fisher

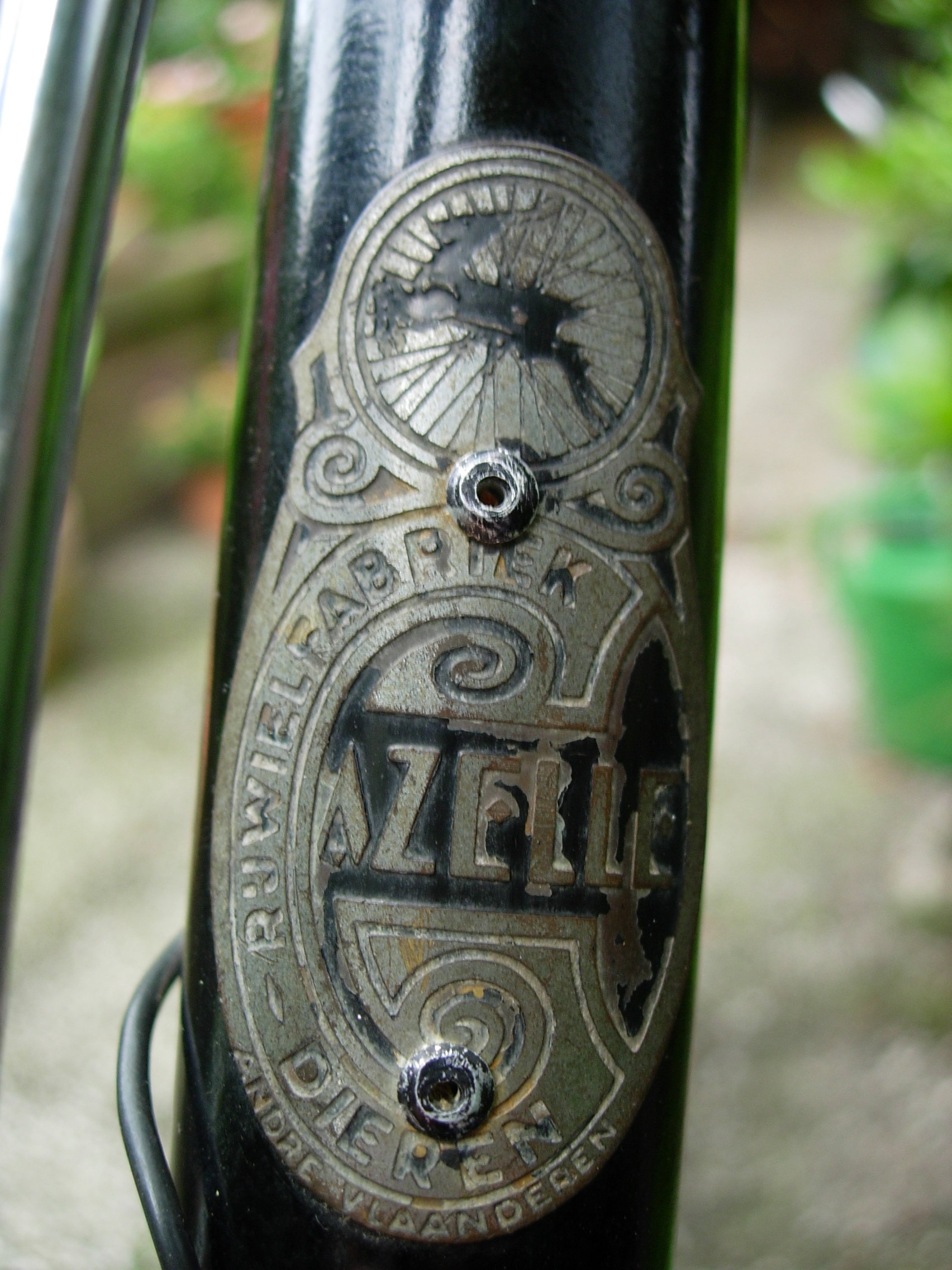
Gazelle

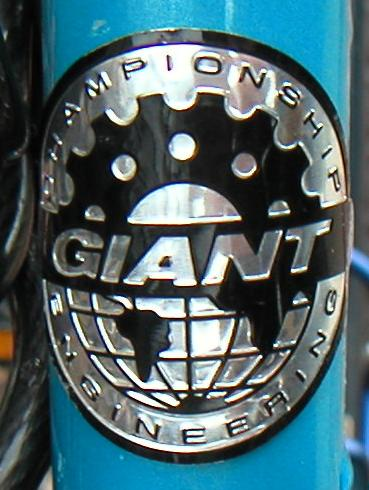
Giant

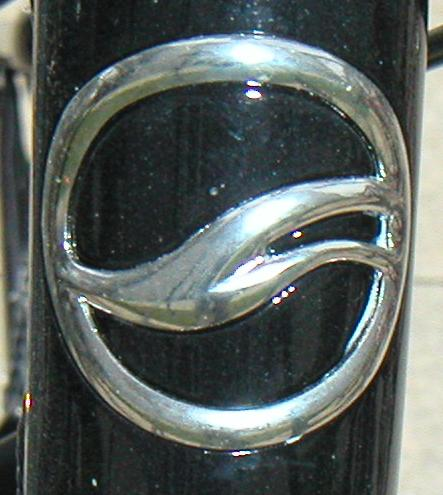
Giant

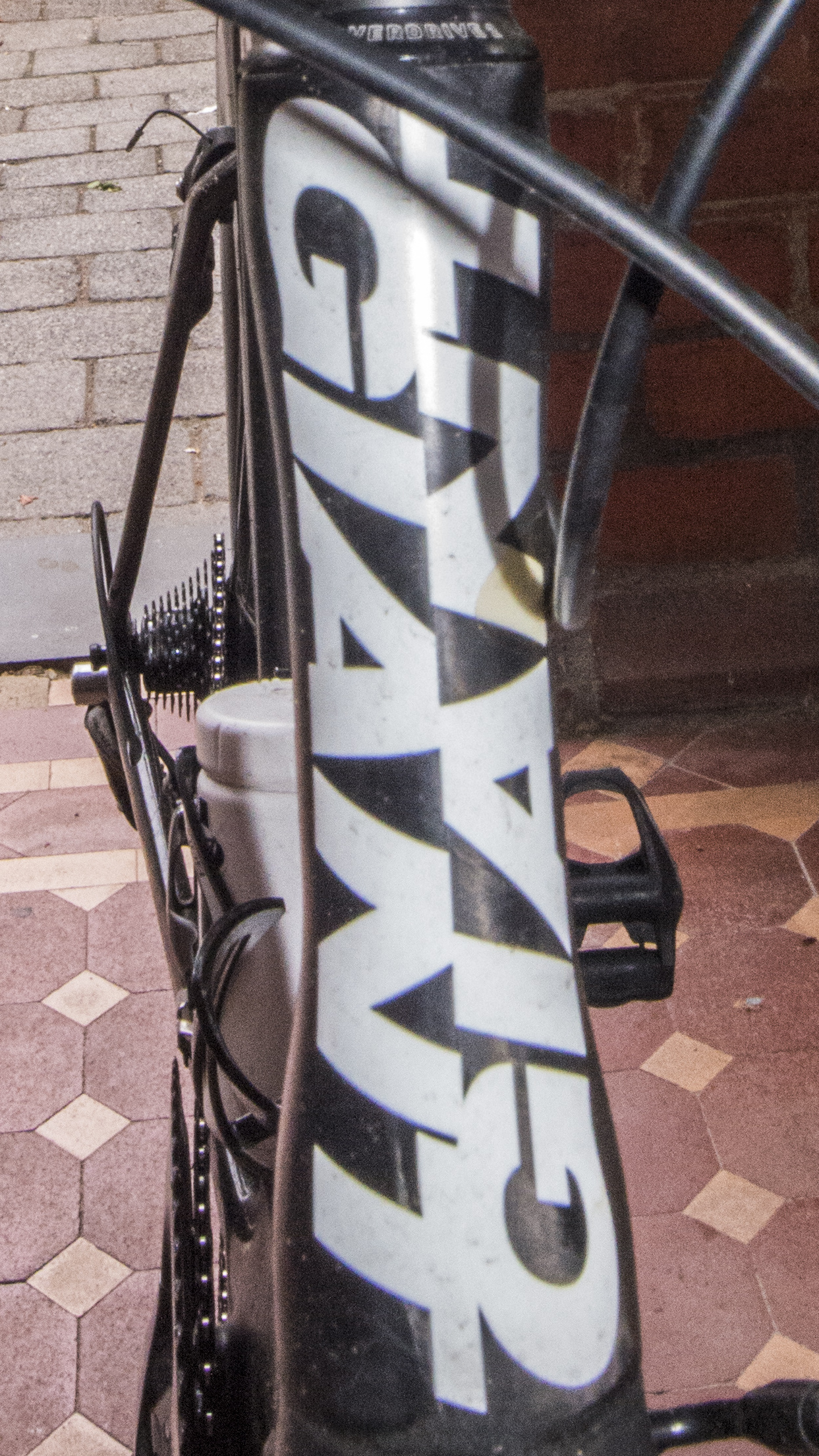
Giant

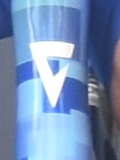
Giant

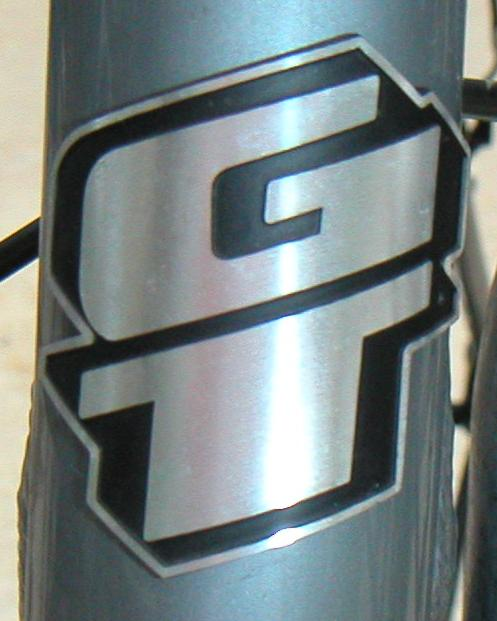
GT

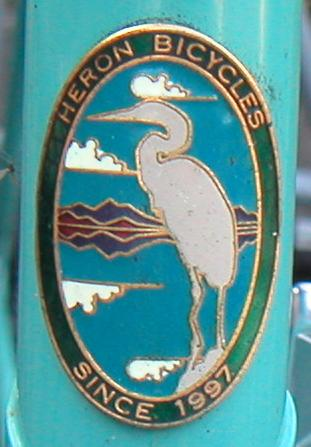
Heron

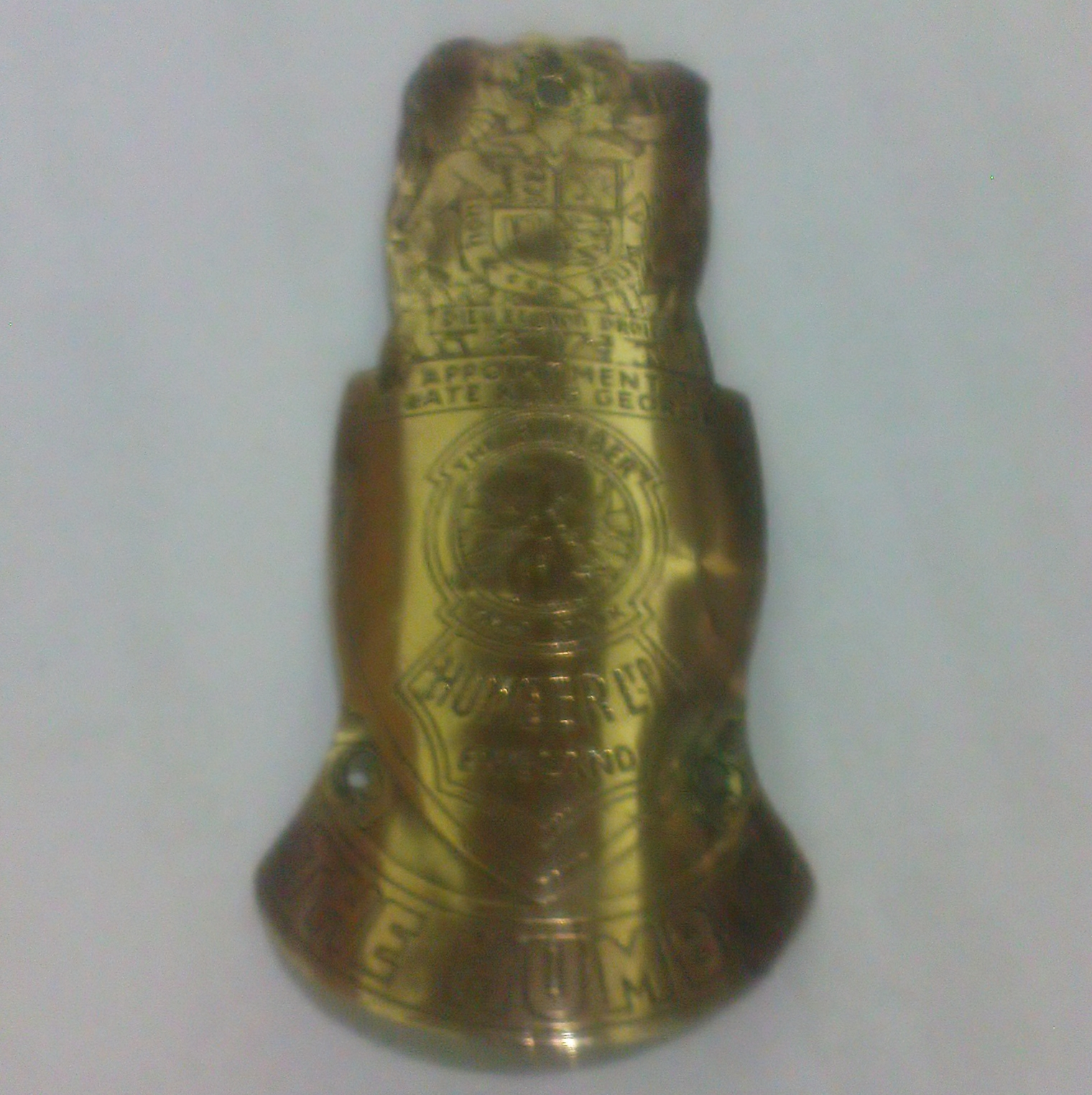
Humber

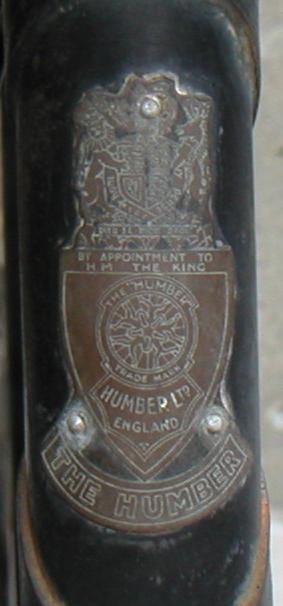
Humber

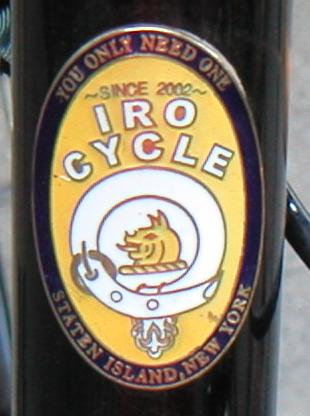
IRO

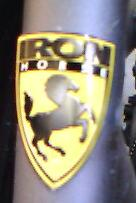
Iron Horse

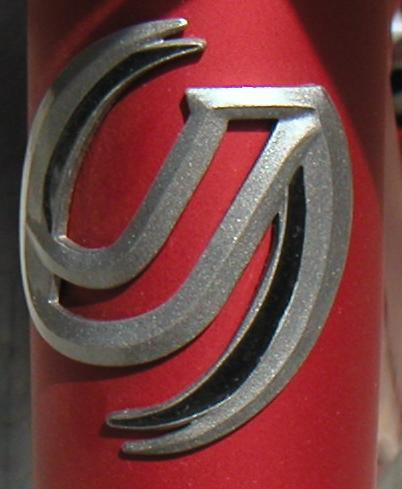
Jamis

Kabuki

Krystal by Nissan Cycles

LeMond

LeMond

LeMond

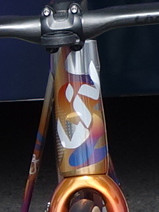
Liv by Giant

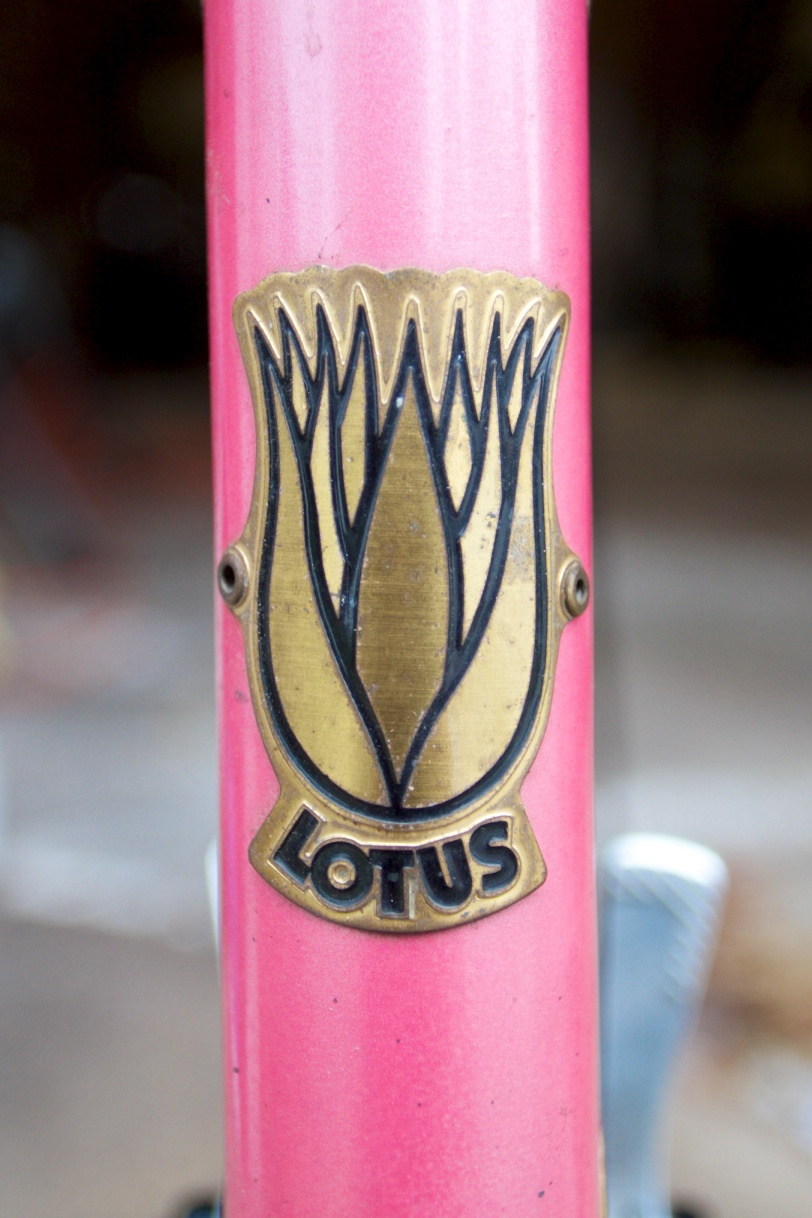
Lotus

Manta

Milwaukee Bicycle Co.

Miyata

Mongoose

Mongoose

Motobécane

Nishiki

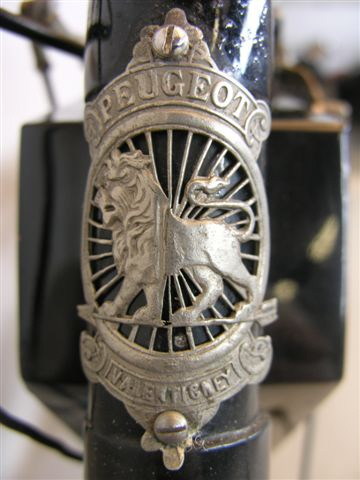
Peugeot

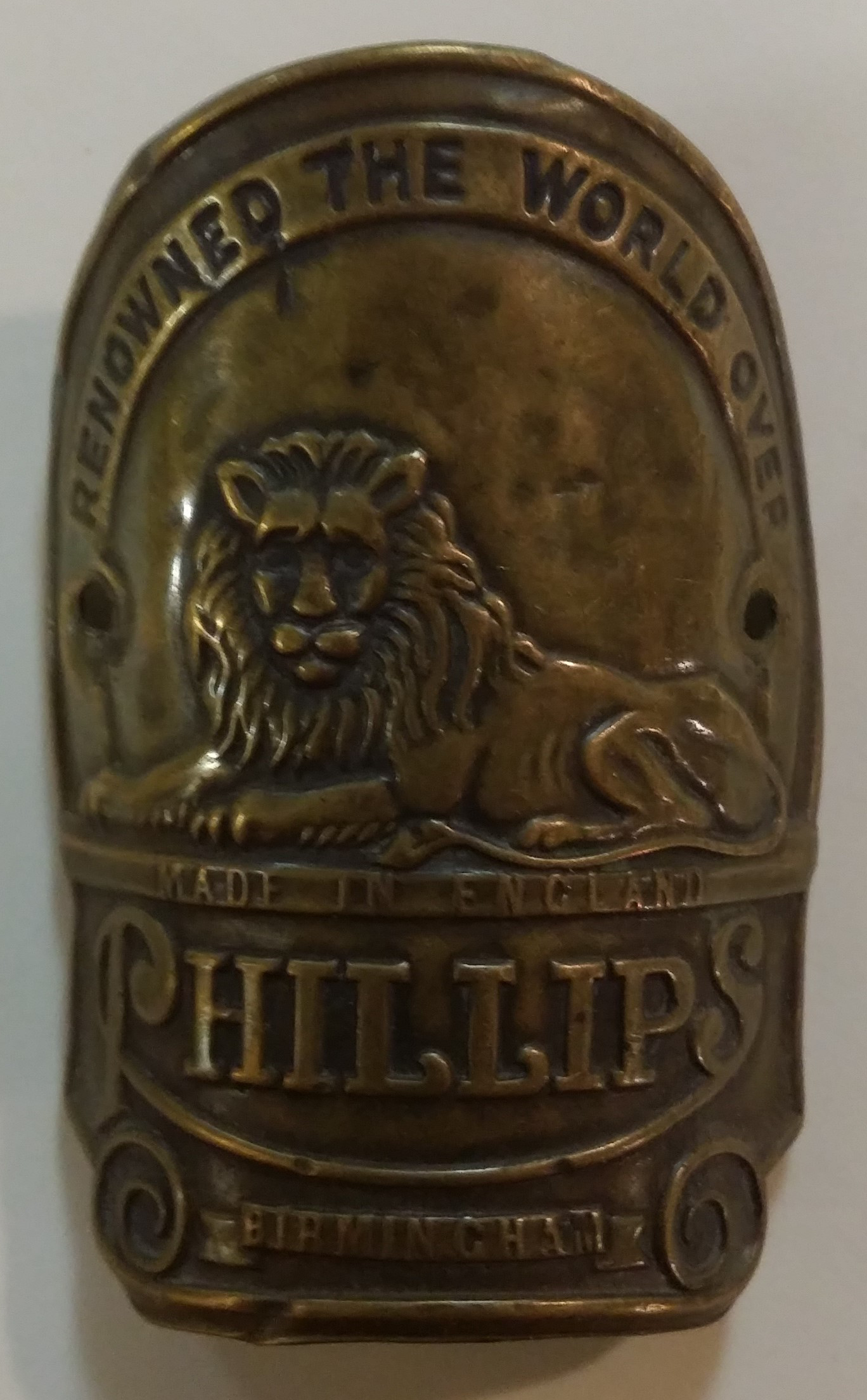
Phillips Cycles

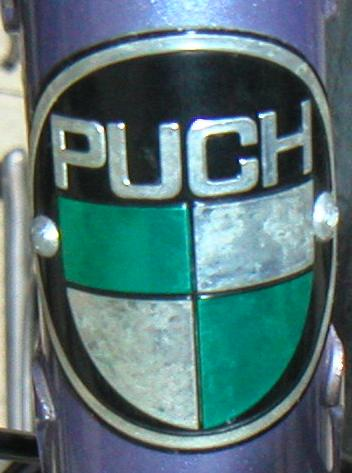
Puch

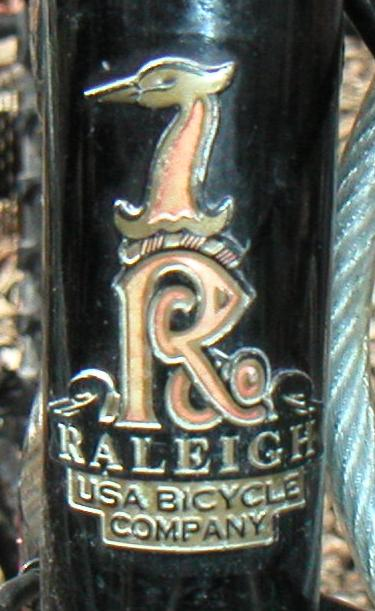
Raleigh

Rudge

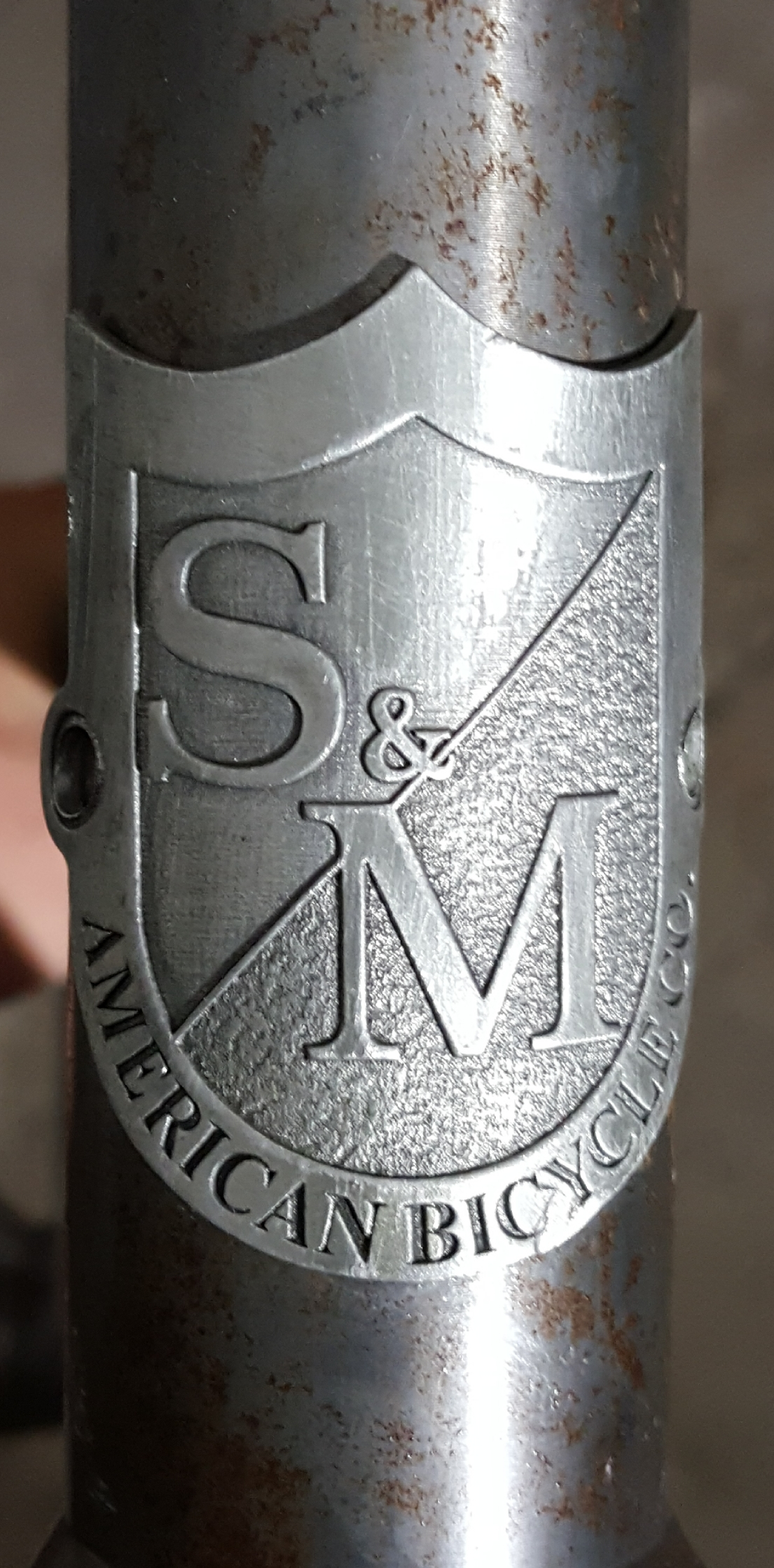
S&M American Bicycle Company

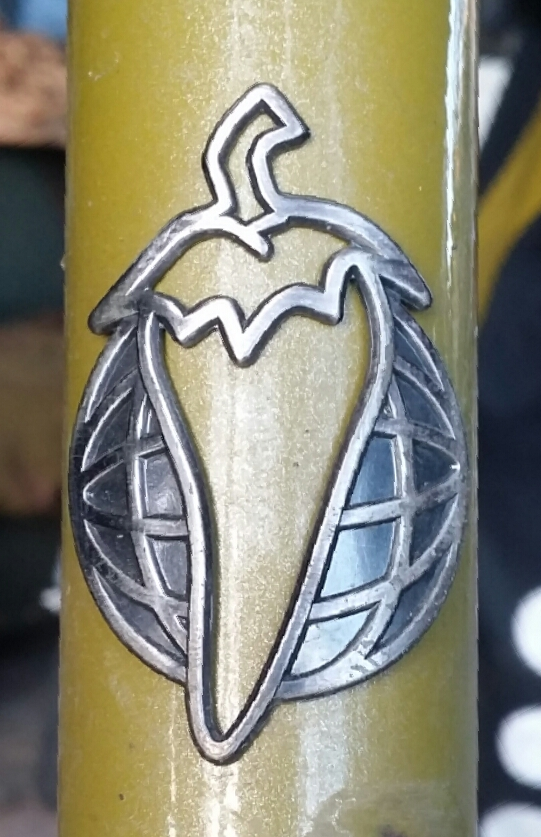
Salsa Cycles

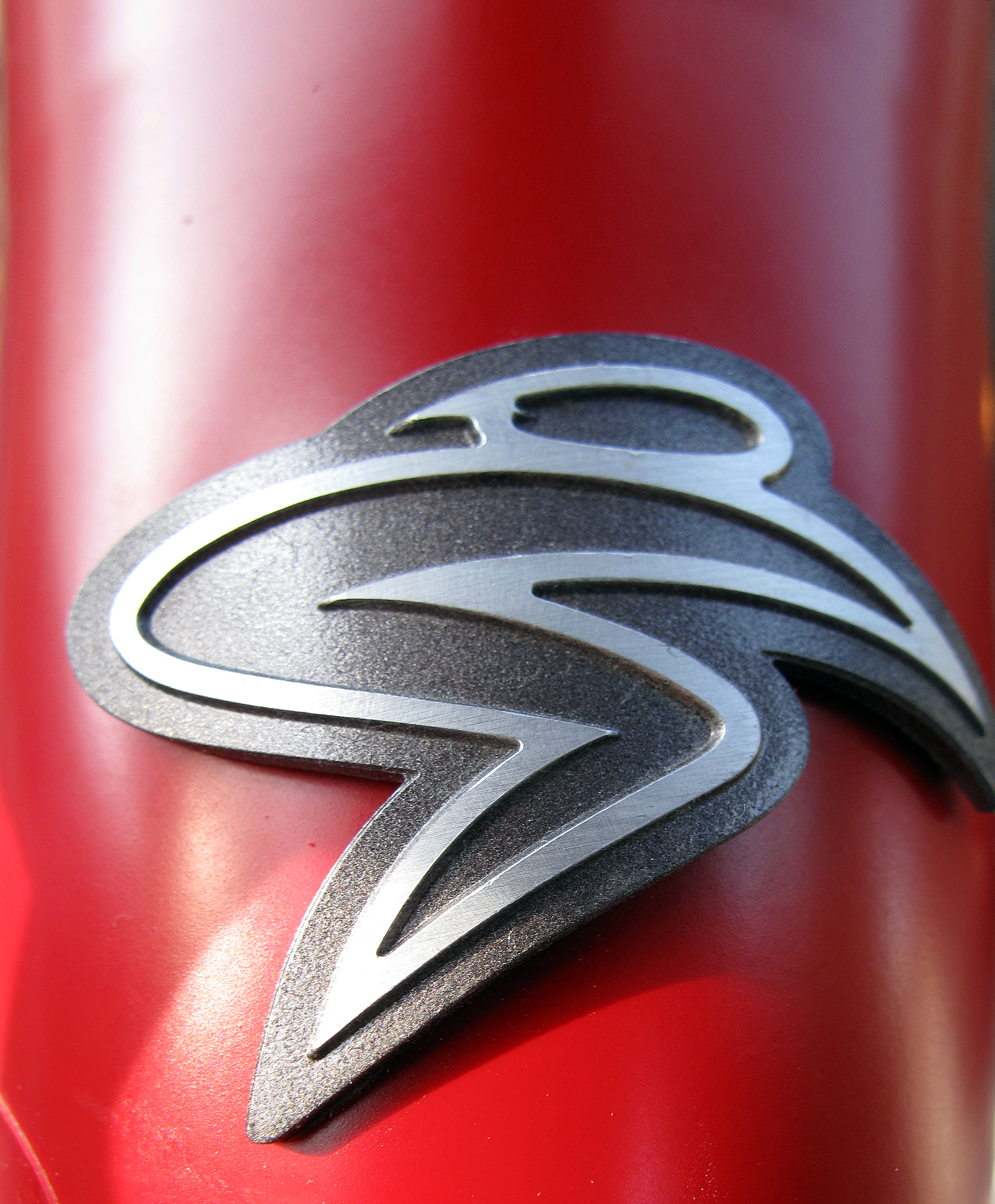
Santa Cruz

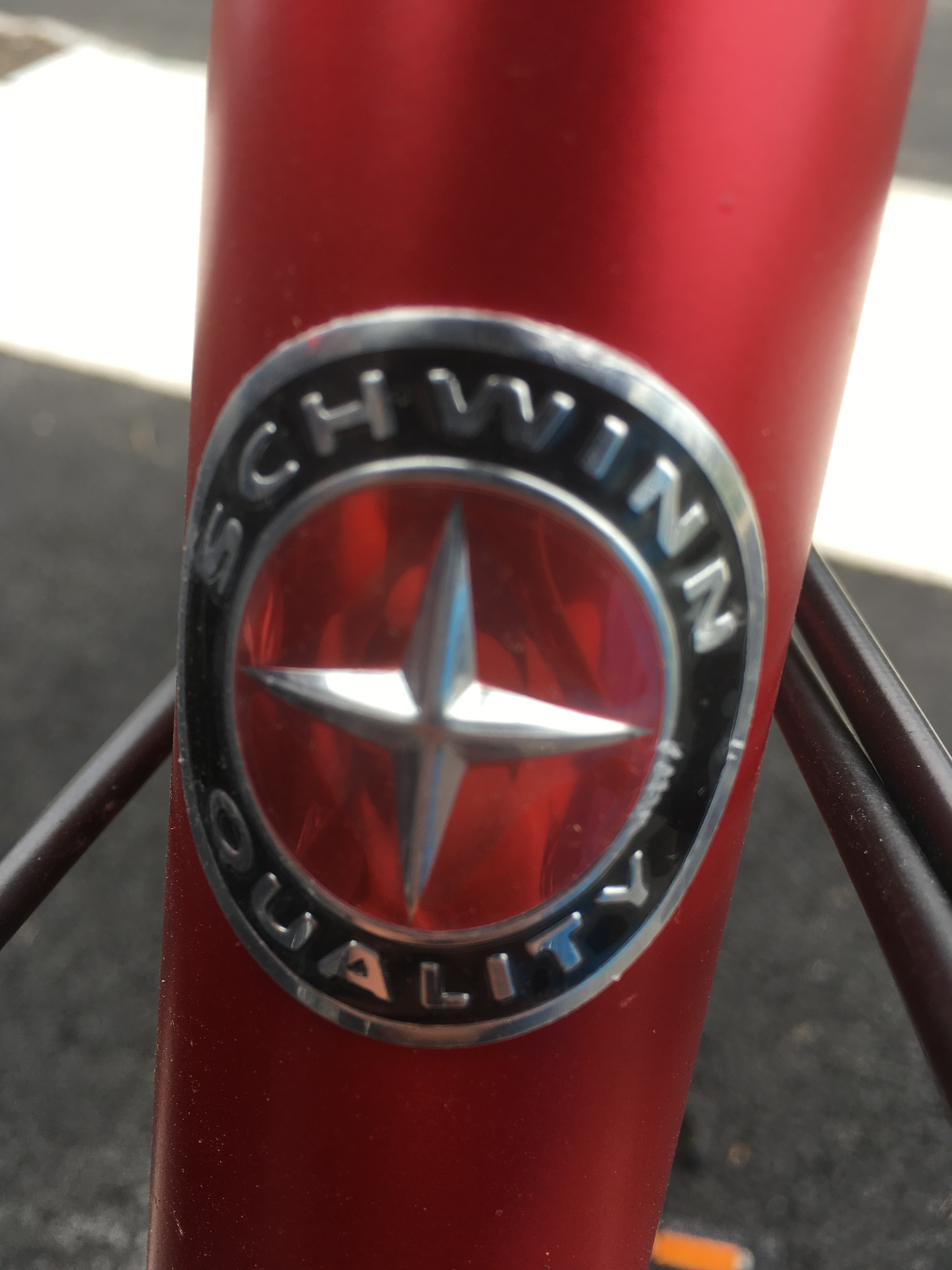
Schwinn

SE Bikes

Sekai

Shogun

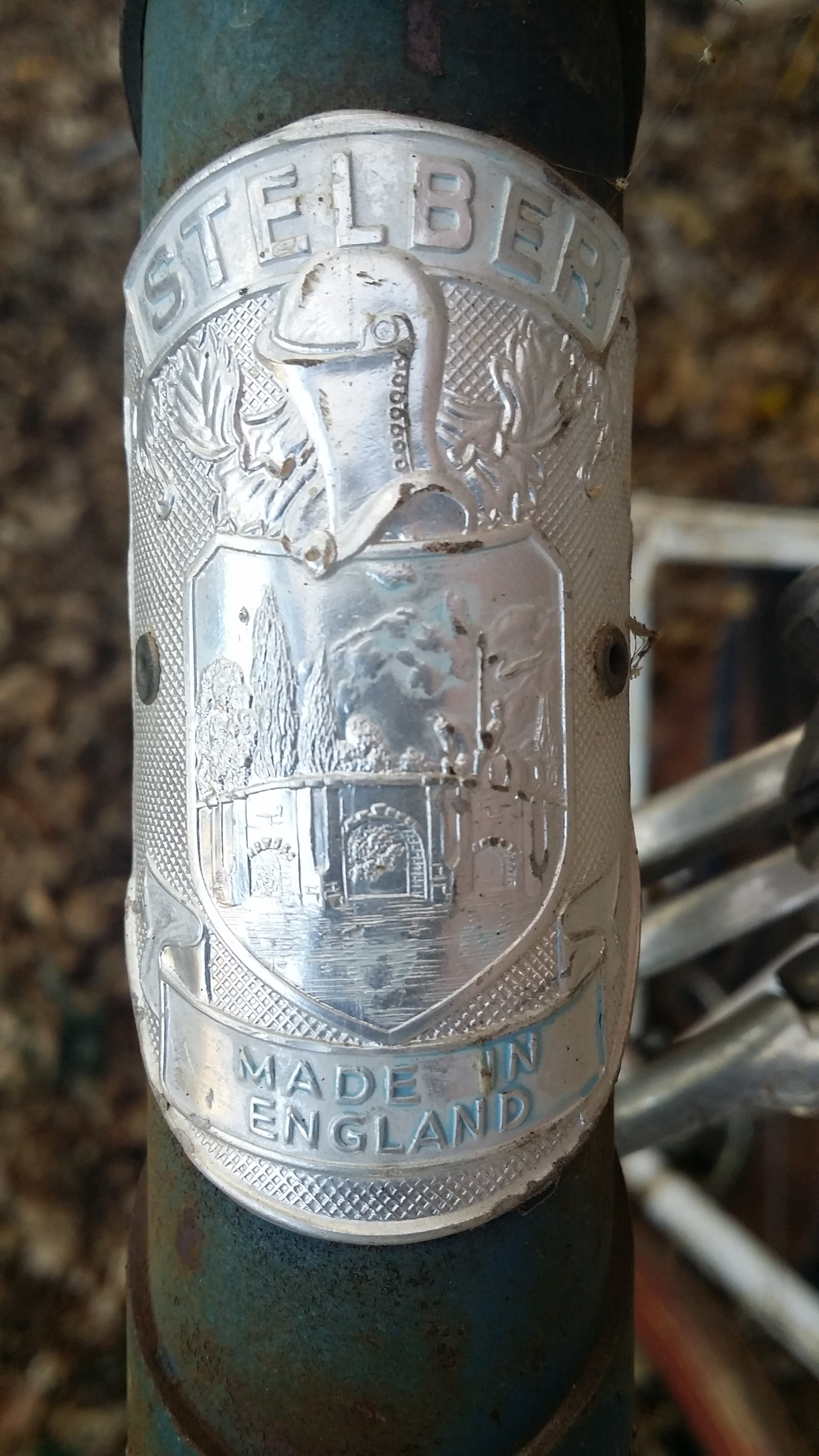
Stelber Cycle Corp

Surly

Takara

Takara

Trek

Trek

Trek

Trek

Trek

Triumph

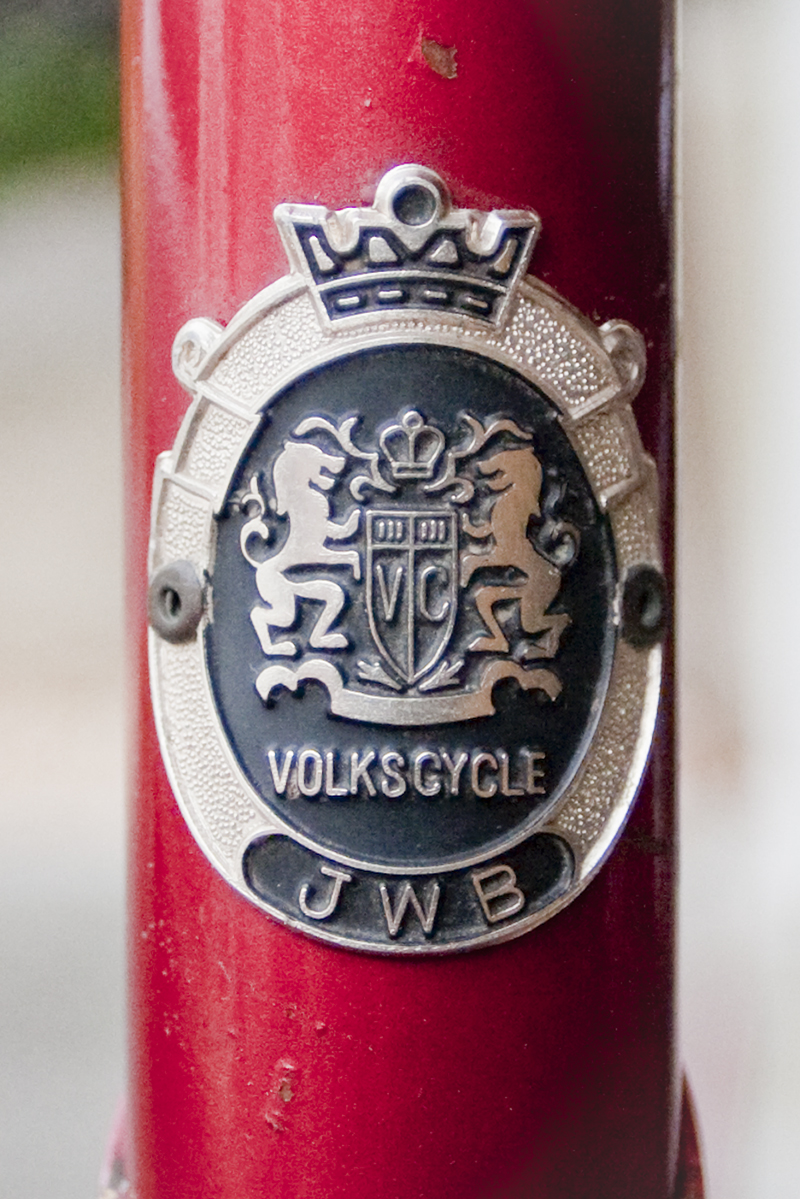
Volkscycle

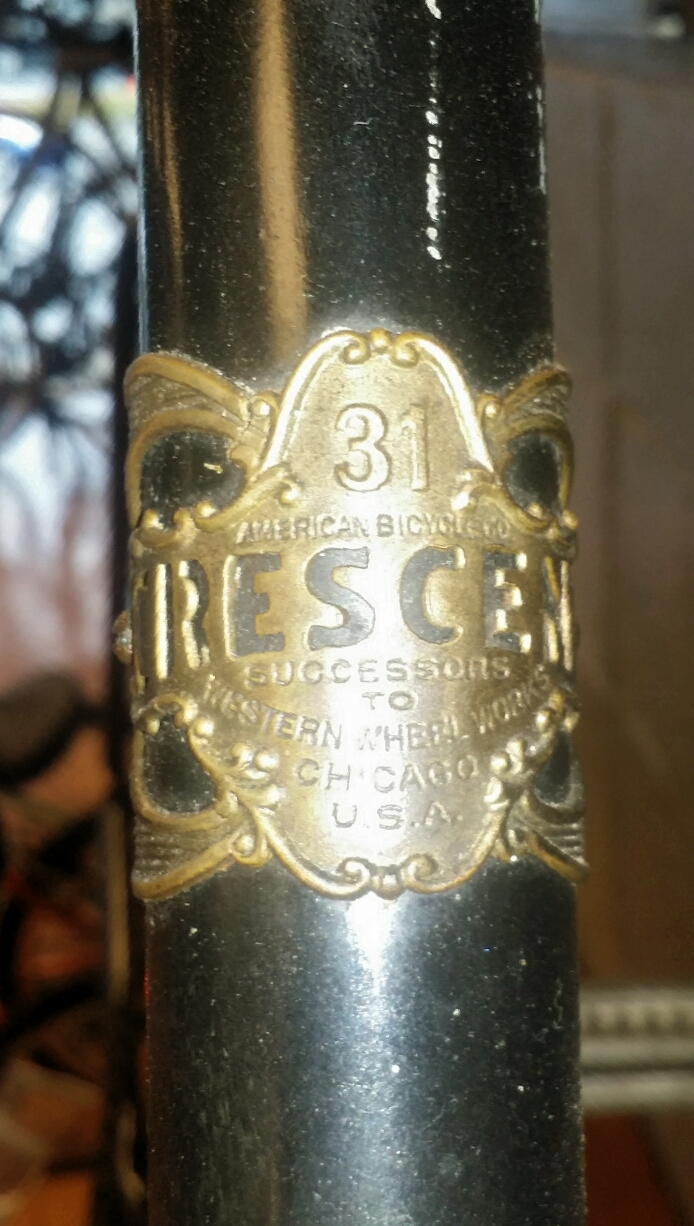
Western Wheel Works

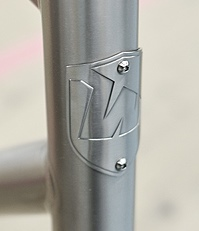
Wittson Custom Ti Cycles

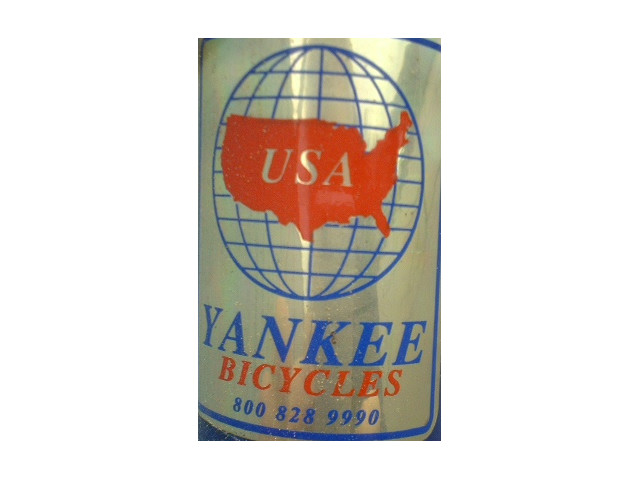
Yankee Bicycle Company

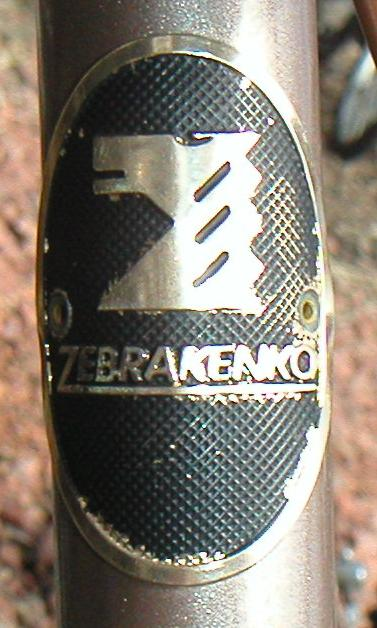
Zebrakenko

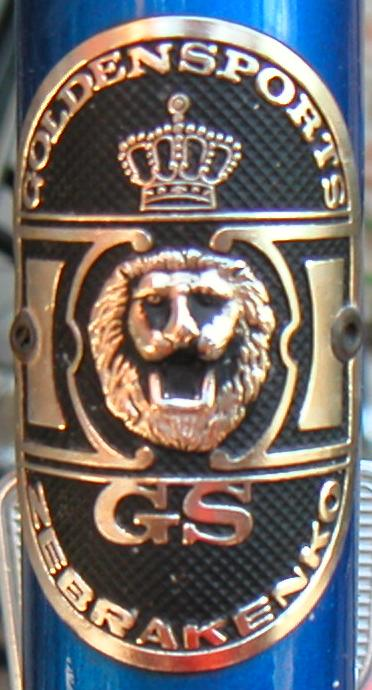
Zebrakenko

== See also ==
- Builder's plate
- Label
- List of current automobile manufacturers by country
- List of bicycle brands and manufacturing companies
- Nameplate
