= Felt Bicycles =

American bicycle company

Felt Racing, LLC
- Company type: Limited Liability Company
- Industry: Bicycles
- Founded: 1991; 35 years ago
- Headquarters: Rancho Santa Margarita, California, U.S.
- Key people: Jim Felt
- Products: Bicycles
- Parent: Pierer Mobility AG (KTM)
- Website: feltbicycles.com

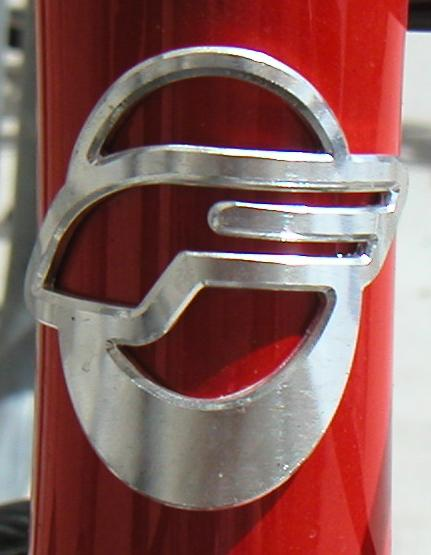
Felt head badge

Felt Racing is an American bicycle brand based in Irvine, California. Felt produces road, track, cyclocross, electric bicycles, and cruiser bikes. All design is completed in the United States and the majority of production comes from Asia. The company also has a strong reputation in the time trial/triathlon bike area and for several years provided bicycles to UCI teams in the Tour de France. Felt still supports several professional level race teams including Hincapie Racing and Team Twenty 16.

== History ==
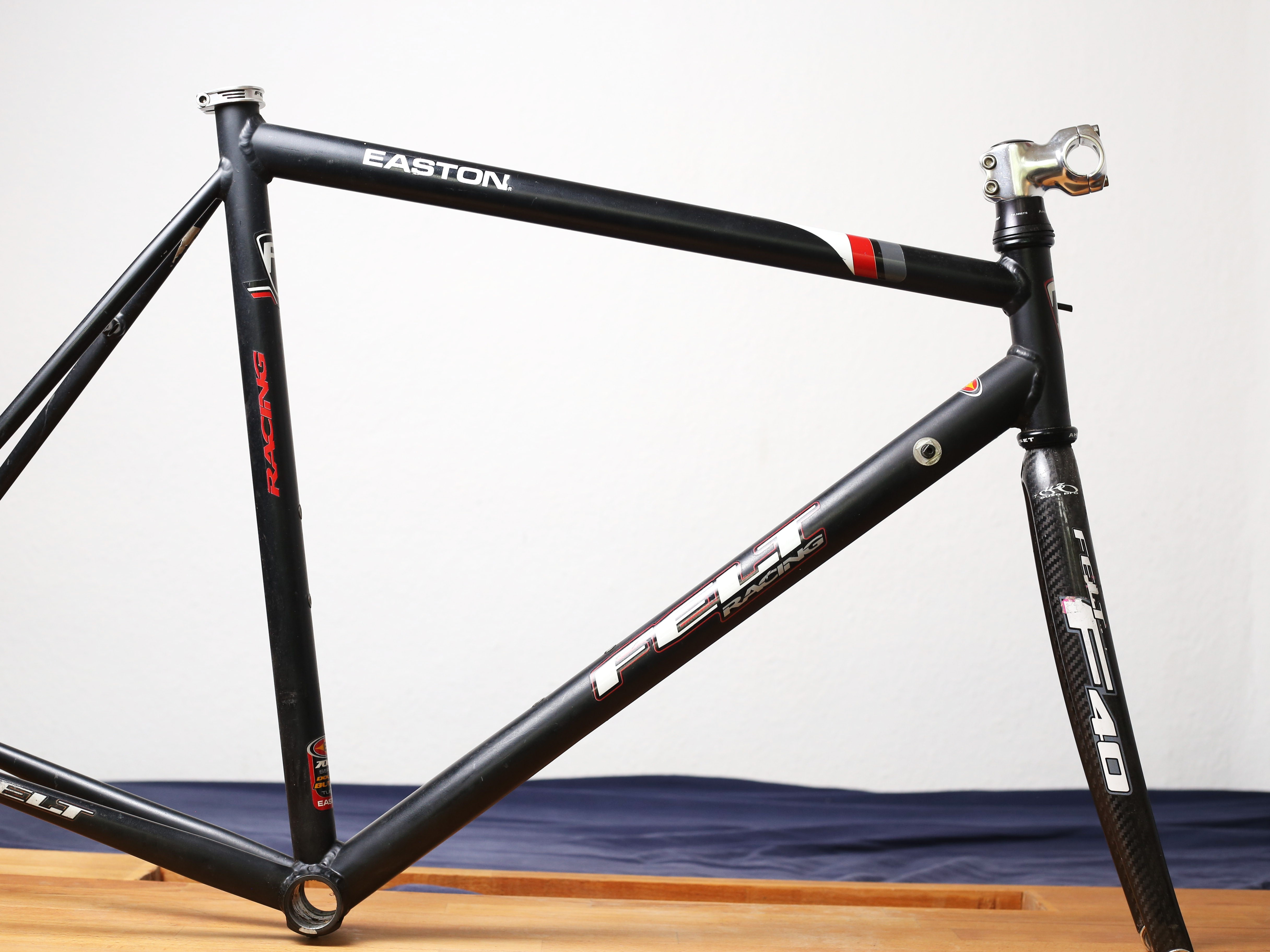
Felt Easton road frame

Felt was founded by Jim Felt in early 1994 when Felt products were distributed by Answer Products. Felt nearly disappeared from the domestic market following a fallout with Answer after a seven-year relationship. The brand was relaunched in 2001 as an independent company.

On February 3, 2017, Rossignol Group announced the acquisition of Felt Bicycles. The announcement noted that Felt had grown to $60 million in revenue at the time of sale, though terms of the acquisition were not disclosed.

Rossignol announced in March 2022 that it is selling Felt Bicycles to Pierer Mobility (KTM).

== Technology ==
Felt has developed several unique bicycle technologies. For its time trial/triathlon bikes, Felt has developed the Bayonet Fork, which utilizes an external steerer in front of the head tube for additional stiffness and aerodynamic efficiency. Felt has also developed the Equilink suspension system for its full-suspension mountain bikes.

Felt extensively utilizes wind tunnel and computational fluid dynamics modeling in its frame design process.

=== Recall ===
Felt has issued a recall of 2009 Felt model B12, B16 and S32 road bicycles because the steerer tube can break, causing the rider to lose control, fall, and suffer injuries.

== Sponsorships ==
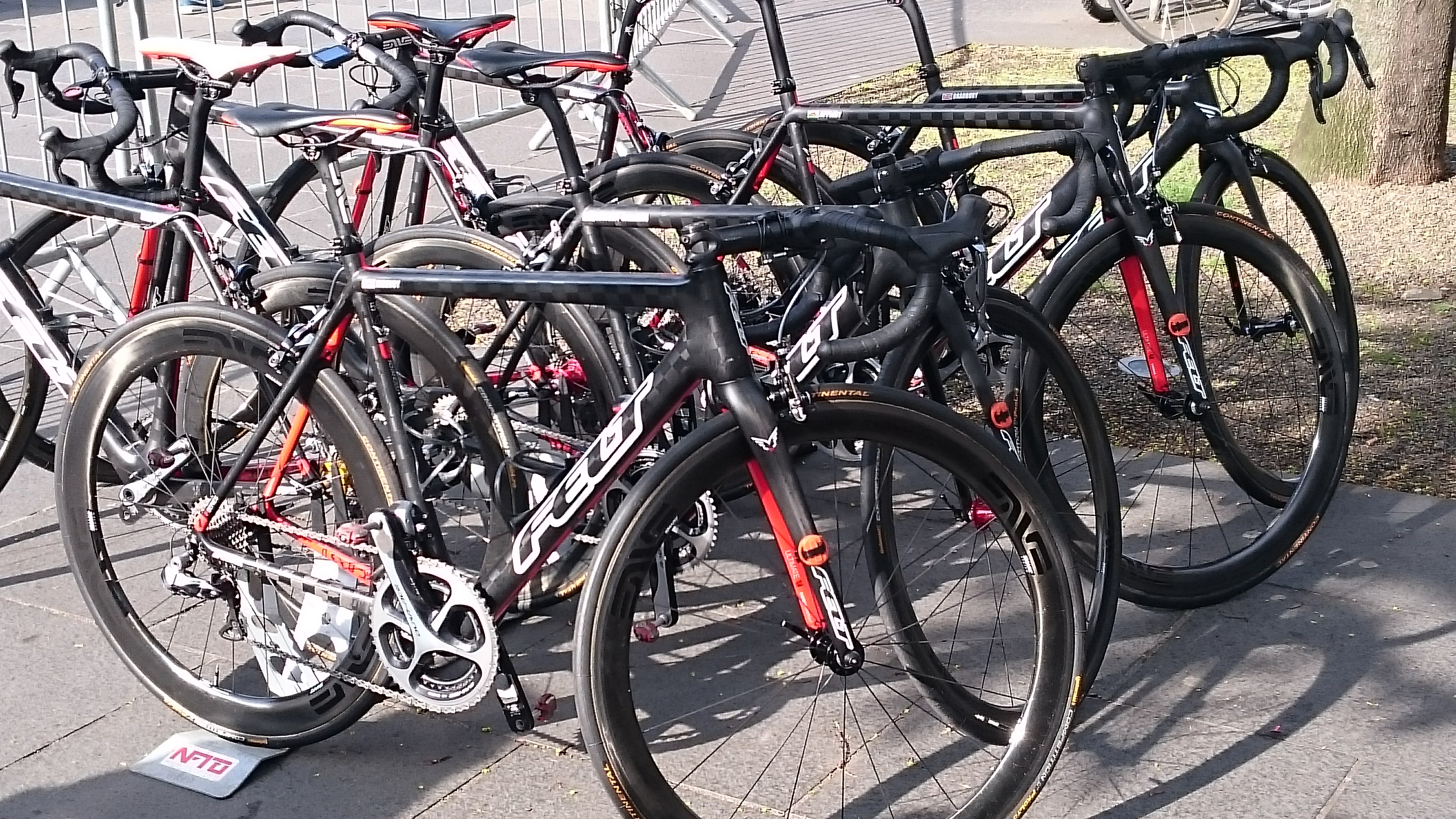
The Felt bicycles used by the NFTO team at the Edinburgh round of the Tour Series in May 2016

In 2007 Felt sponsored the Slipstream–Chipotle bicycle team. In 2009, Felt signed a three-year agreement to supply frames to the Garmin–Slipstream team. On August 28, 2010, Garmin–Transitions announced it was switching working agreements from Felt Bicycles to Cervelo bikes and change its name to Garmin–Cervélo for the 2011 season. Felt chose not to exercise its option with the Boulder-based cycling team after a four-year working agreement. The Cervélo TestTeam folded and some riders moved to Garmin–Cervélo. From 2012 to 2013 Felt Bicycles was the bicycle sponsor for Argos–Shimano with team rider Marcel Kittel winning four stages of the 2013 Tour de France. In 2014 Felt became the bike sponsor to the US Continental team, Hincapie Sportswear Development Team.

The US Women's track cycling team won a silver medal riding Felt bicycles at the 2016 Olympics in Rio.

Jennifer Valente won two gold medals, one in the Omnium and another in the Team Pursuit, riding Felt bicycles at the 2024 Olympics in Paris.

=== Athletes sponsored by Felt ===
- Daniela Ryf
- Mirinda Carfrae
- Sarah Hammer
- Tim DeBoom
- Jennifer Valente

=== Logos ===
Felt Bicycles logo used from 2005 until 2015.

Felt Bicycles F-Wing symbol used from 2011 until 2019.

Felt Bicycles wordmark used since 2015.

Felt Bicycles logo used since 2019.

=== Gallery ===
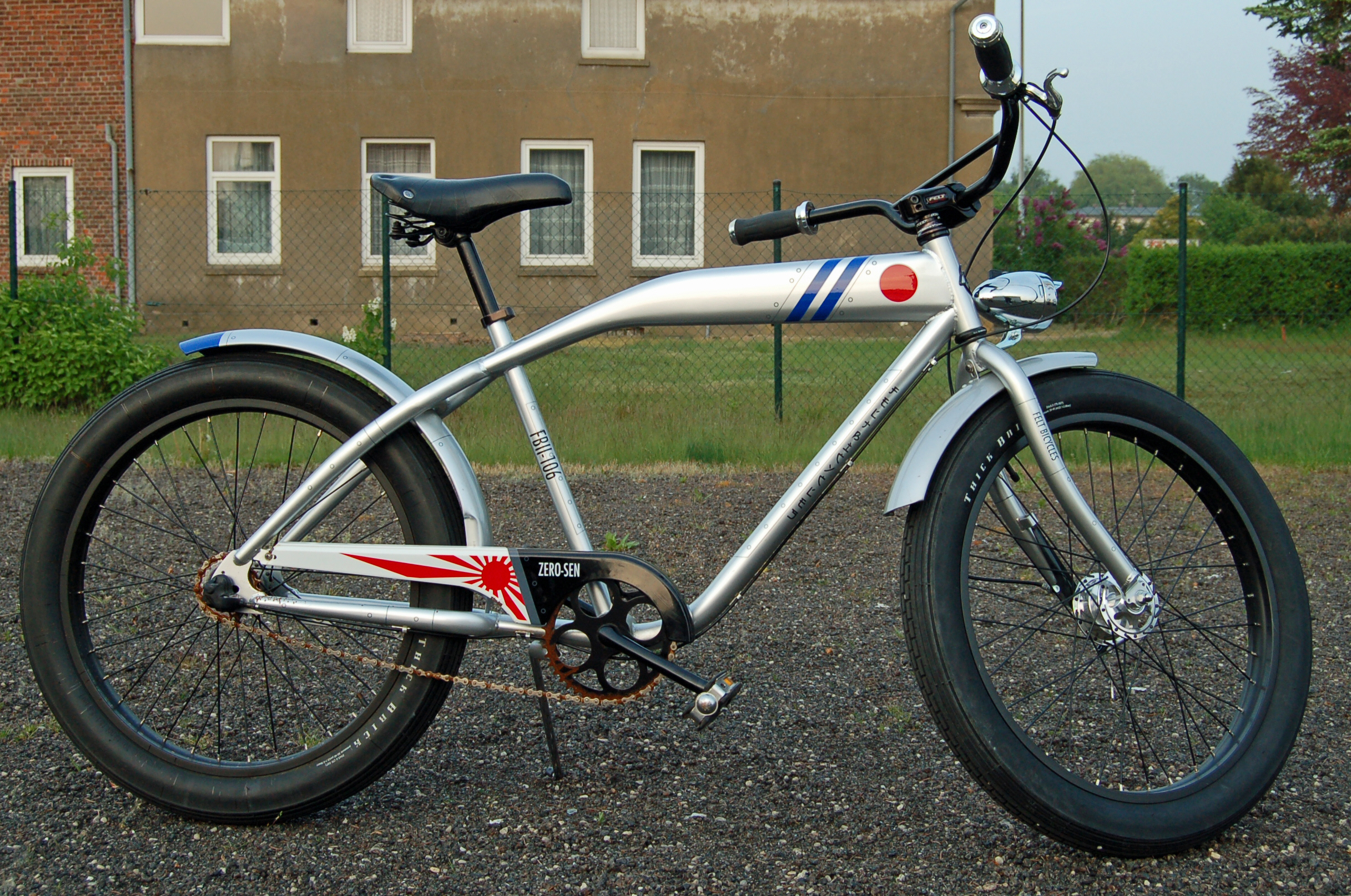
Felt Beachcruiser ZERO SEN

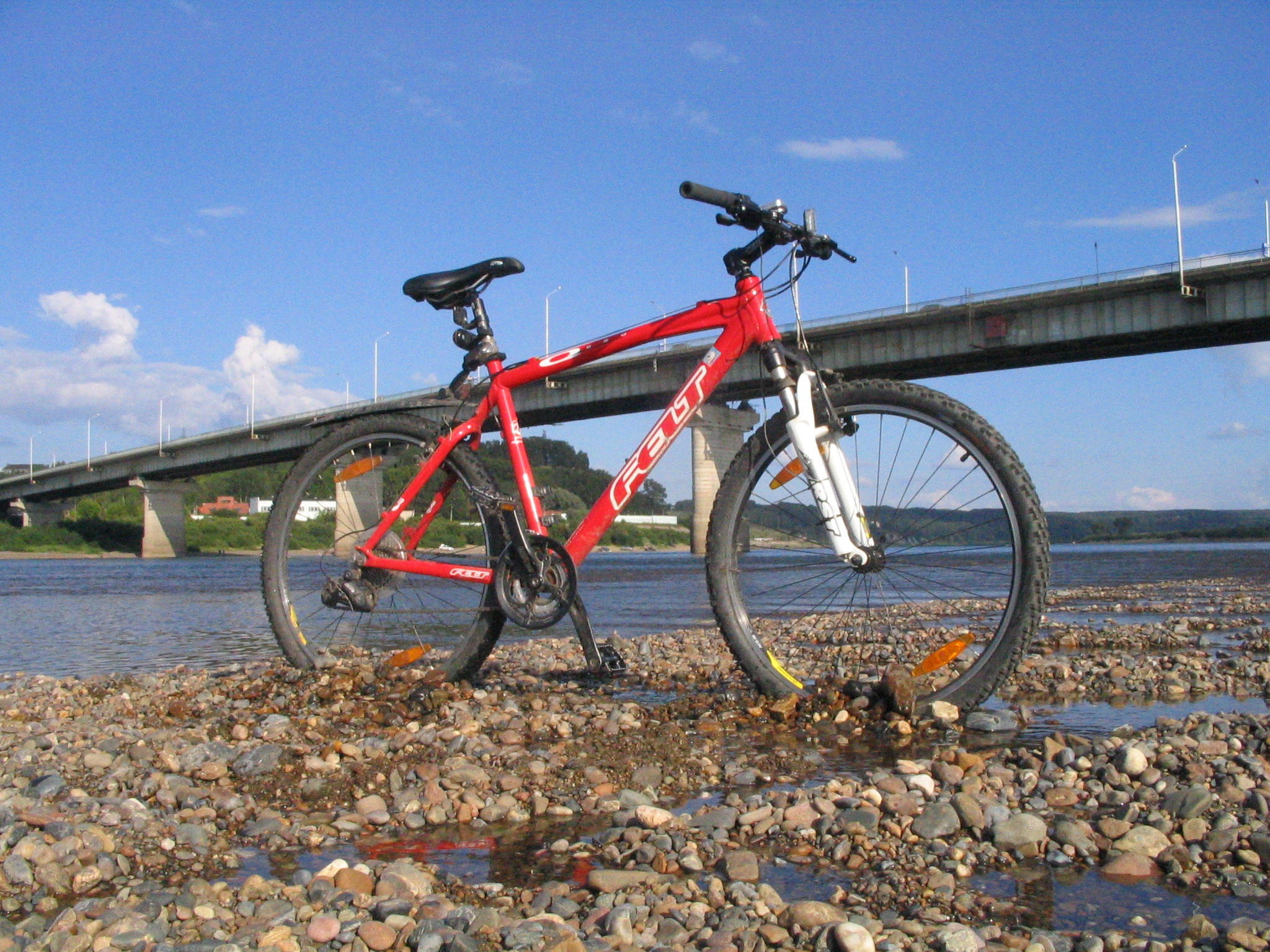
Felt Q650

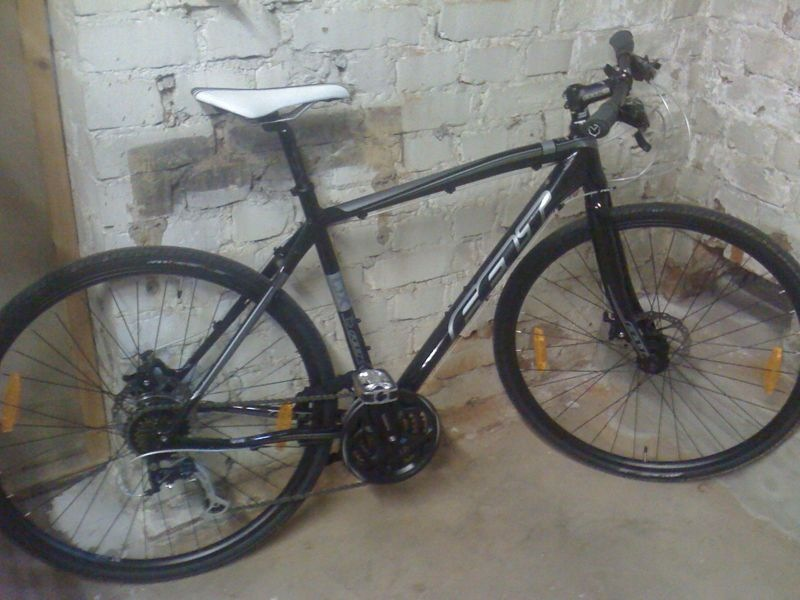
Felt Verza QX75 (2011 model)

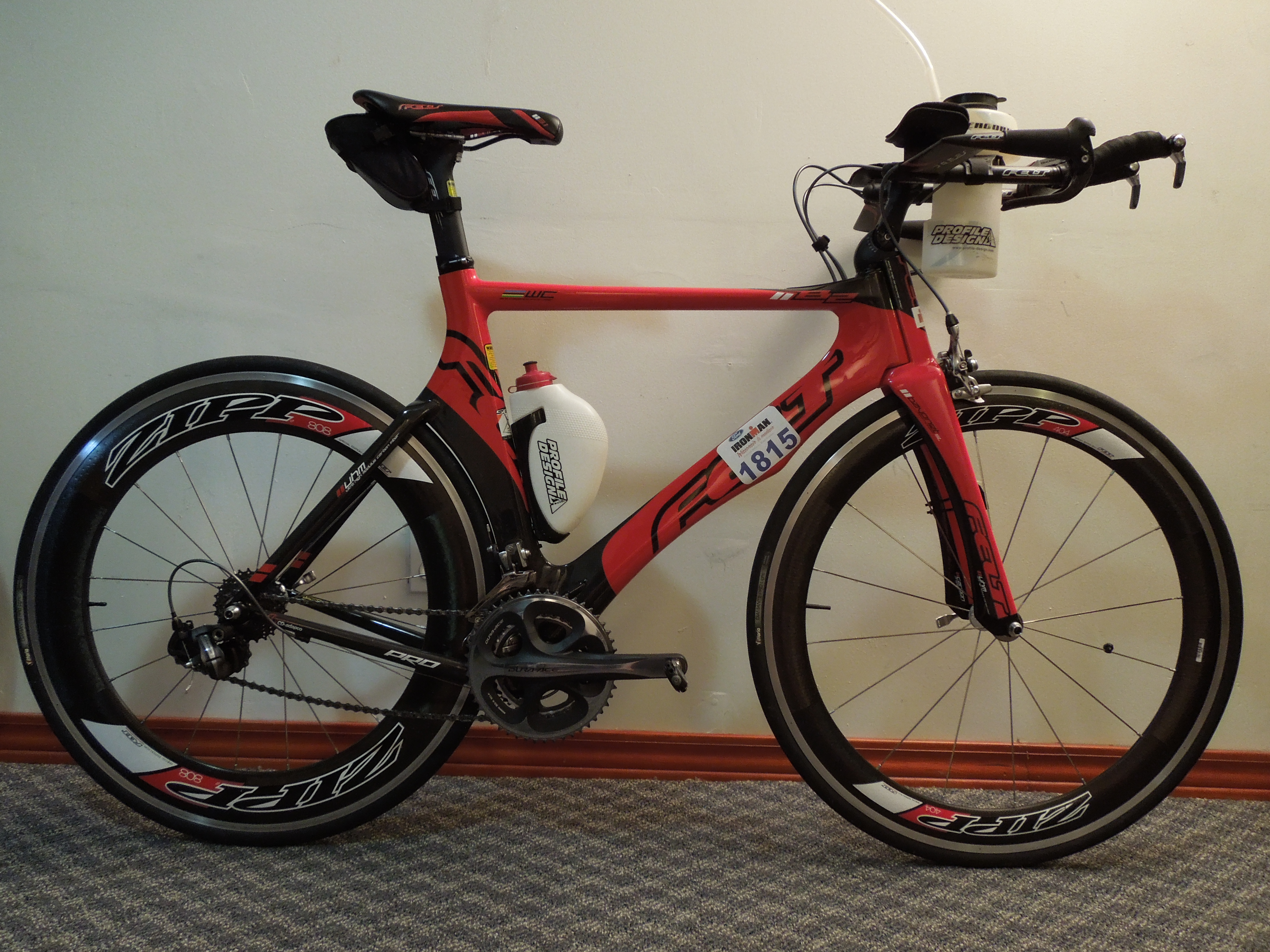
Felt B2 Pro with Felt edition Zipp wheels

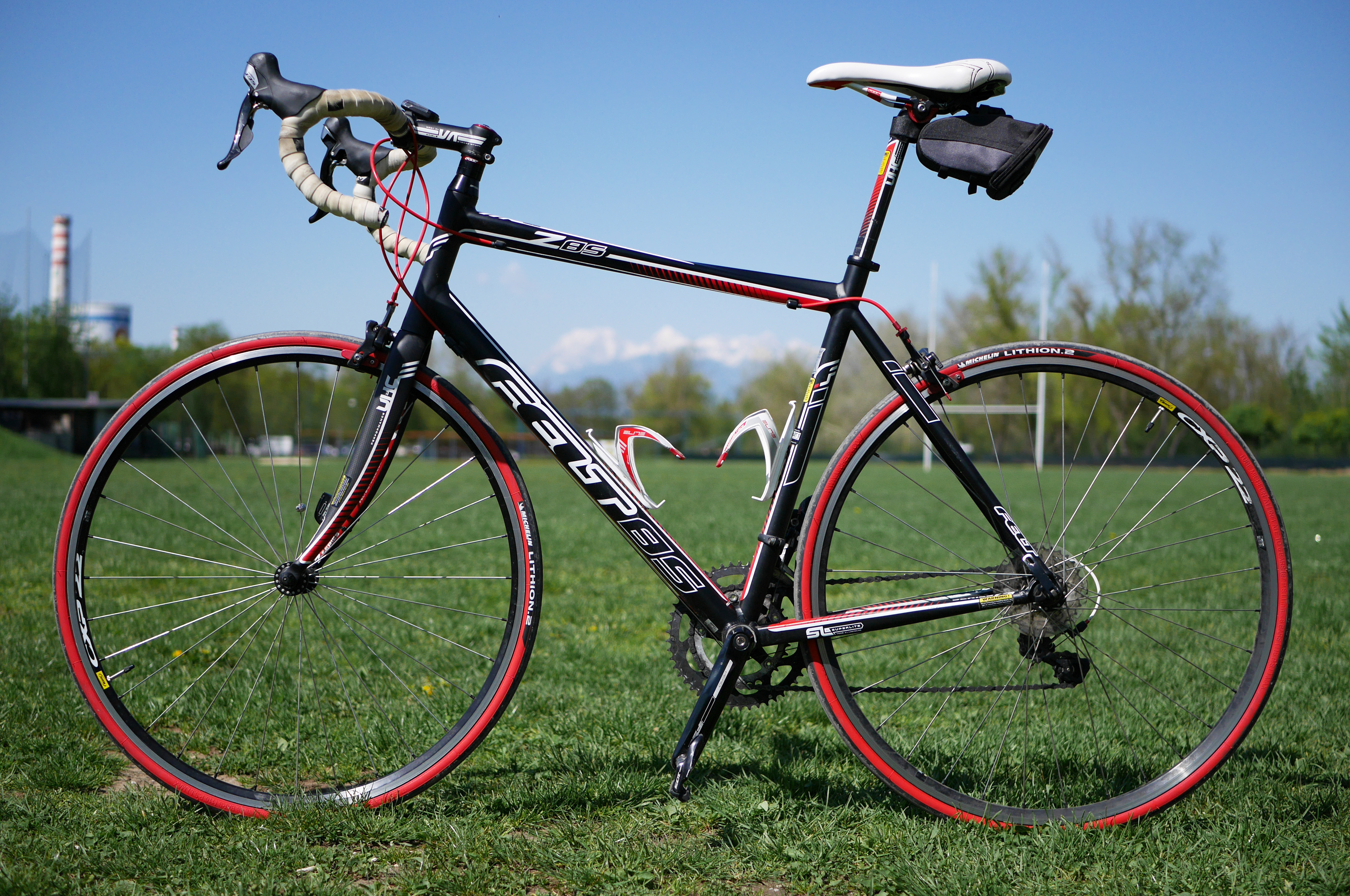
Felt Z85 road bicycle with Aluminium frame
