= Wittson Custom Ti Cycles =

- Type: Private
- Founded: 1994
- Founder: Vidmantas Zukauskas
- Headquarters: Klaipėda, Lithuania
- Products: Titanium bicycle frames and forks
- Website: wittson.com

Wittson Cycles is a Lithuanian handmade bicycle manufacturer located in Klaipėda. Wittson works exclusively with titanium and sources the European Grade 9 tubes from Baltic neighbor Sweden and the VSMPO Titan Scandinavia corporation, which also supplies aerospace luminaries Boeing and Airbus. Wittson uses 3/2.5 Ti for their frame production, and 6/4 Ti, which has greater tensile strength but is much harder to weld, for dropouts and bottom bracket shells, along with smaller bits such as brake cable stops.

== History ==
Wittson Custom Ti Cycles was founded by a famous Lithuanian pro cyclist and the coach of first, independent Lithuanian National Cycling Team Vidmantas Zukauskas. In the mid 90s Vidmantas has combined his cycling and coaching experience to start building titanium bicycle frames for such companies as Colnago, Van Tuyl, Argon18, Red Bull and many others. Later on his son Mindaugas joined him and so the name Wittson was born.

== Vidmantas as a pro cyclist ==
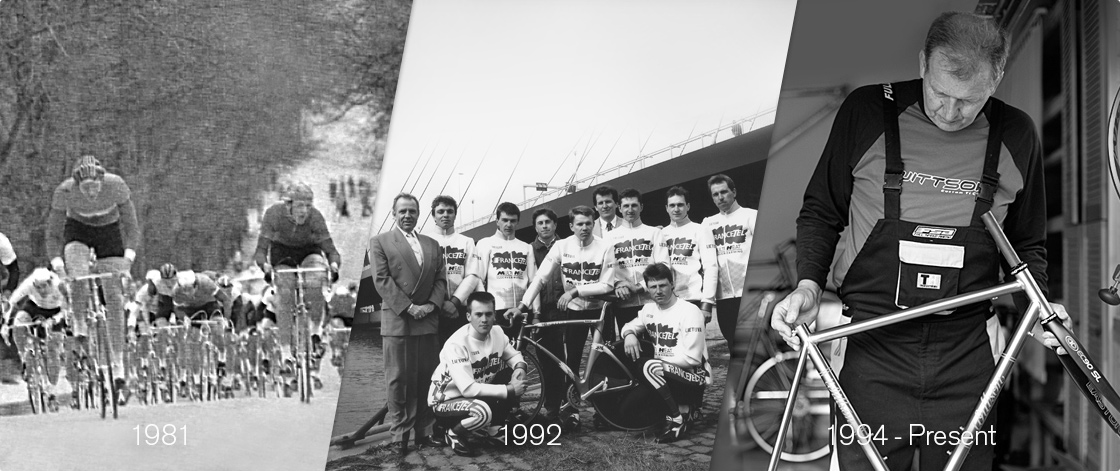
Vidmantas Zukauskas life at a glance - a pro cyclist, a coach and a master of titanium frame building.

Vidmantas was born in a small village in Lithuania. His family could never afford a sports bicycle for him, but Vidmantas pursued his dream and signed up for a Cycling Sport School. This day changed his life forever as he became addicted to cycling and to this day his whole life centres around bicycles.

Vidmantas' most notable achievements as a pro cyclist:

- 1977 – 1st National Road Race Championships
- 1977 – 3rd Overall Tour of Lithuania
- 1979 – 3rd Overall Tour of Lithuania
- 1980 – 2nd Overall Tour of Lithuania

== Collection ==
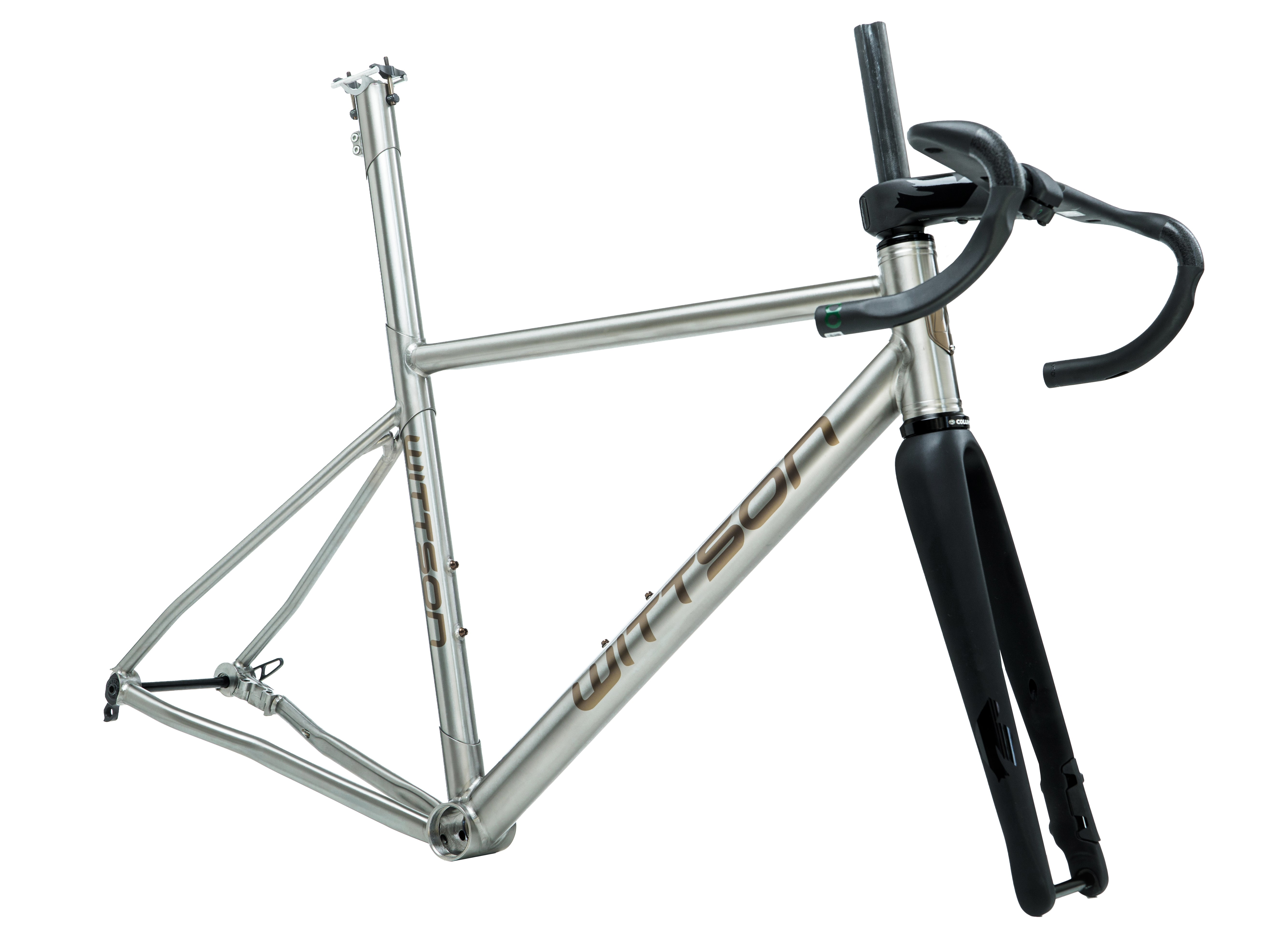
Wittson road race model Deva with a fully integrated cockpit

=== road race integrated DEVA ===
Weight: 1480g (size M)

Material: grade 9 ti

- modern road race disc geometry
- fully integrated COLUMBUS Trittico cockpit
- oversized externally and internally butted headtube
- oversized double butted downtube
- integrated seatpost with a support on toptube/seatstays cross section
- shallow hydroformed seatstays
- Illuminati brake bridge
- hydroformed chainstays
- fully integrated brake cable routing
- T47 bottom bracket
- flat disc mount
- made in USA PARAGON dropouts compatible with both DT Swiss 142 x 12mm and SHIMANO 142 x 12mm hangers
- DT Swiss 142 x 12mm thru axle removable alu hanger
- hand brushed finish
- custom anodizing
- ti headbadge
- anodized bolts

Compatible with: Di2, EPS, AXS groupset only, tapered ZS44 x EC44 headset, T47 bottom bracket, flat mount disc brake caliper, thru axle 142 x 12mm rear hub, 34.9mm clamp band front derailleur, max 32mm tyre

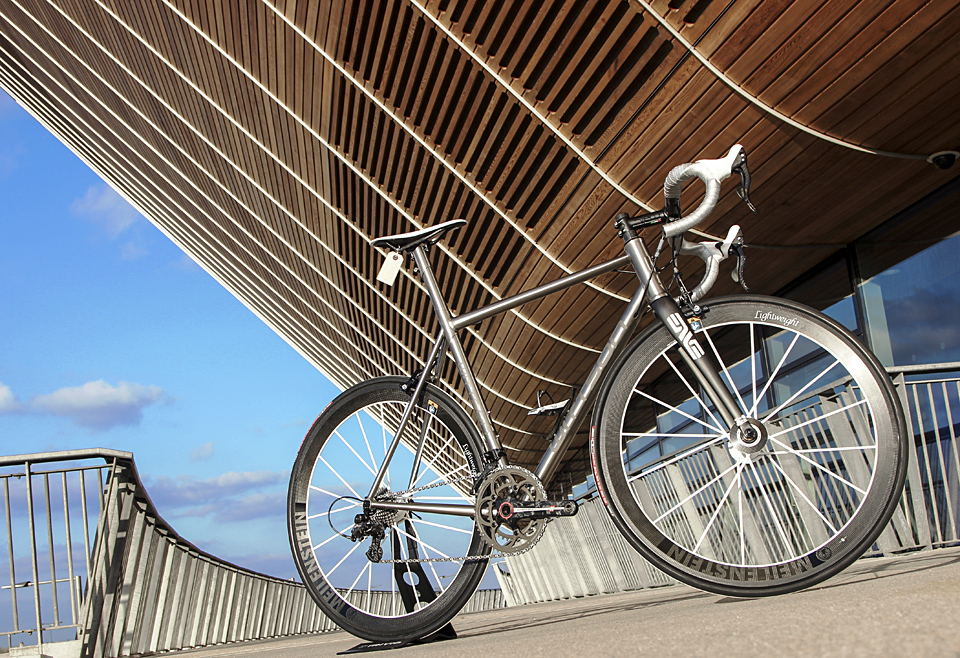
Wittson Suppresio captured in front of Olympic Velodrome, London

=== Road Race Suppresio ===
Weight: 1580g (size M / seat tube uncut)

Material: grade 9 ti

Specifications:

- road race geometry
- oversized externally and internally butted headtube for conical 1.25" fork
- bi-ovalized toptube
- integrated seatpost with a support on toptube/seatstays cross section
- ti seatmast with ti bolts
- straight seatstays
- conical hydroformed chainstays
- integrated brake cable routing
- integrated shifting cable routing
- PressFit 30 bottom bracket
- made in USA PARAGON Wright dropouts with removable alu hanger
- hand brushed finish
- custom sandblasting
- ti headbadge
- anodized bolts

Compatible with: PressFit 30 bottom bracket, 31.8mm clamp band front derailleur

=== Road Race Disc Illuminati ===
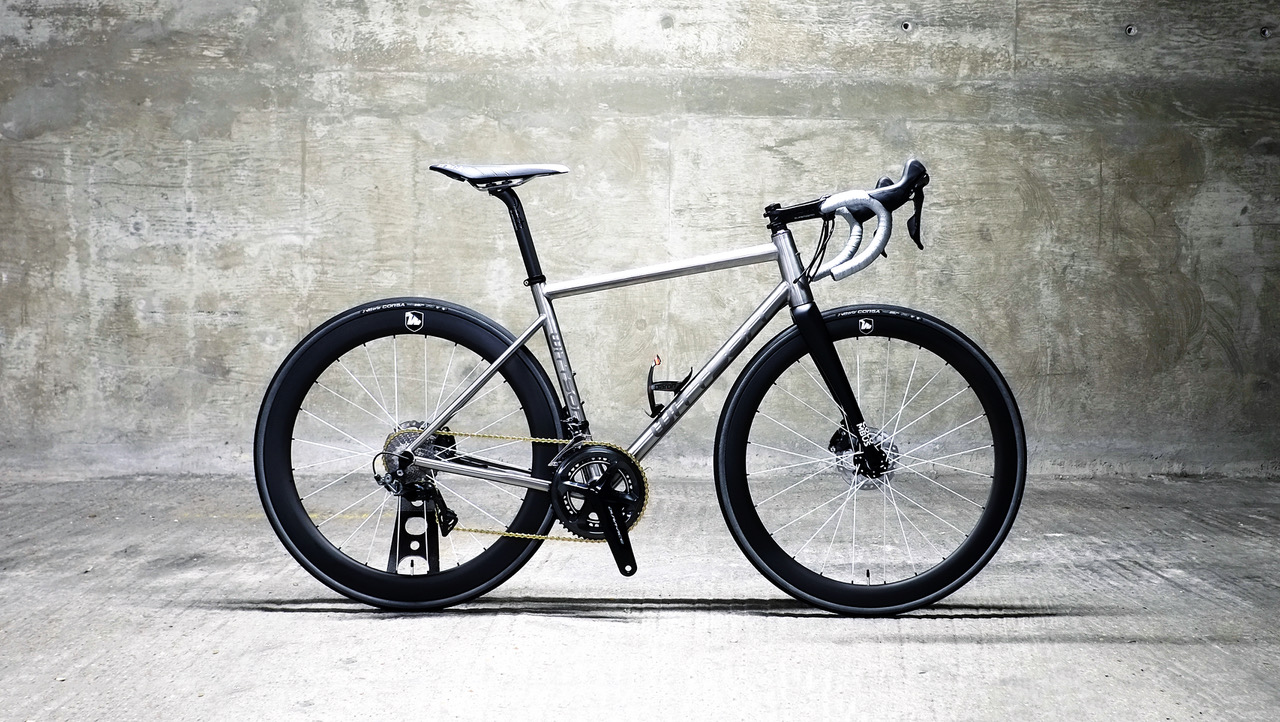
Wittson Illuminati is designed to be specifically disc brake equipped

Weight: 1480g (size M)

Material: grade 9 ti

Specifications:

- road race disc geometry
- oversized conical internally butted headtube for 1.5" fork
- diamond hydroformed toptube
- oversized double butted downtube
- double butted seattube
- shallow hydroformed seatstays
- Illuminati brake bridge
- hydroformed chainstays
- integrated brake cable routing
- integrated shifting cable routing
- PressFit 30 bottom bracket
- flat disc mount
- made in USA PARAGON dropouts compatible with both DT Swiss 142 x 12mm and SHIMANO 142 x 12mm hangers
- DT Swiss 142 x 12mm thru axle removable alu hanger
- hand brushed finish
- custom sandblasting
- ti headbadge
- anodized bolts

Compatible with: integrated tapered IS42/28.6 | IS52/40 headset, PressFit 30 bottom bracket, flat mount disc brake caliper, thru axle 142 x 12mm rear hub, 31.6mm seatpost, 34.9mm clamp band front derailleur, max 28C tyre

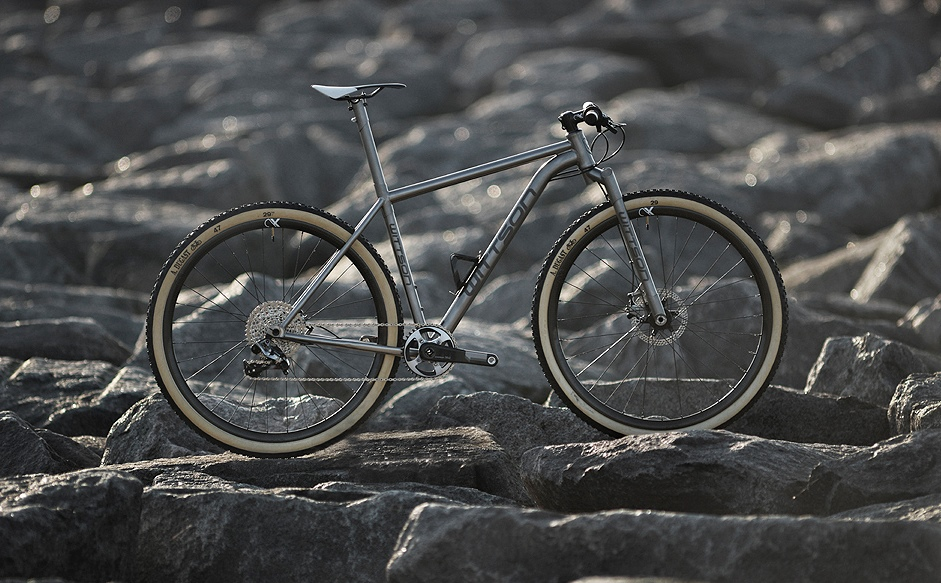
Wittson Bestia captured on the coast of Baltic Sea

=== Cross Country Bestia ===
Weight: 1870g (size M / seattube uncut)

Material: grade 9 ti

Specifications:

- cross country race geometry
- oversized externally and internally butted headtube for conical 1.5" fork
- bi-ovalized toptube
- hydroformed curved downtube
- integrated seatpost with a support on toptube/seatsatays cross section
- ti seatmast with ti bolts
- hydroformed seatstays
- hydroformed chainstays
- integrated disc cable routing
- integrated shifting cable routing
- PressFit 30 bottom bracket
- made in USA PARAGON low mount dropouts with removable alu hanger
- hand brushed finish
- custom sandblasting
- ti headbadge
- anodized bolts

Compatible with: PressFit 30 bottom bracket, 34.9mm clamp band front derailleur, max 27.5/29x2.25 tyre

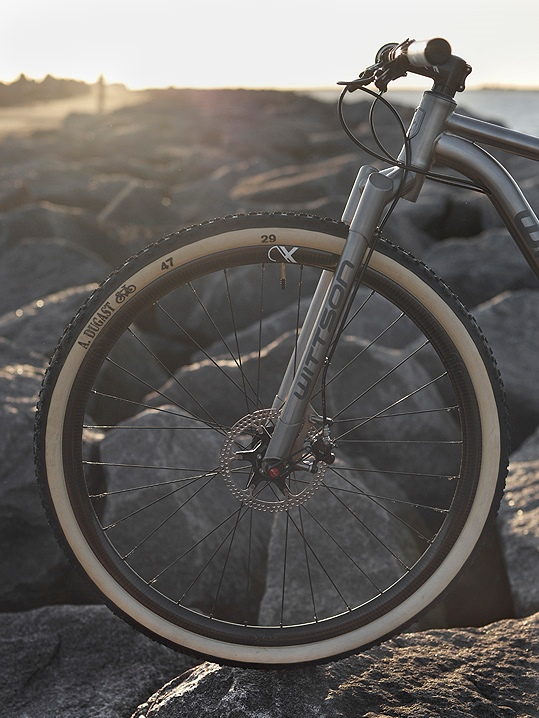
Wittson Nulla captured on the coast of Baltic Sea

=== 29er Fork Nulla ===
Specifications:

- material: grade 9 ti
- weight: 1023g (steerer uncut)
- wheel size: 29"
- diameter: 1 1/8" or 1 1/8” - 1.5"
- max. tyre size: 29x3.00
- max. rotor size: 185mm
- rake: 45mm
- axle to crown: 470mm
- steerer length: 270mm
- dropouts: quick release or thru axle
- integrated brake hose
- floating postmount
- hand brushed finish
- custom sandblasting

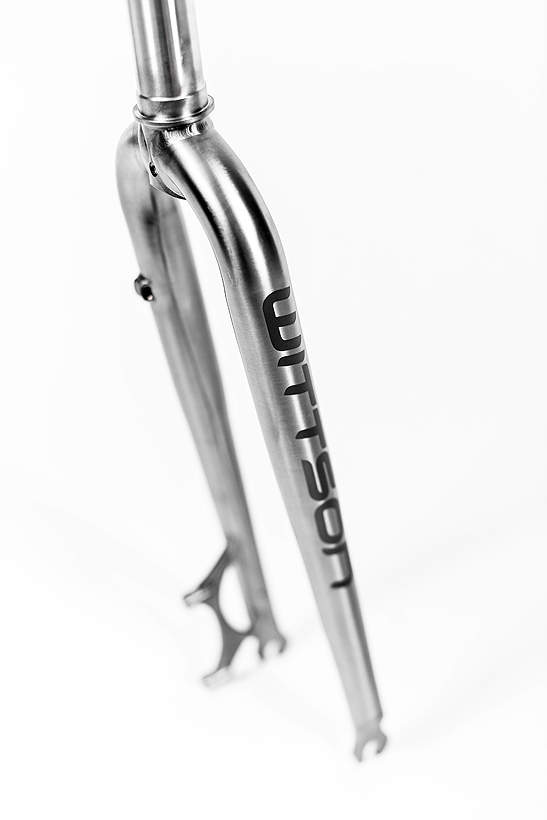
Cyclocross Disc Fork Ele

=== Cyclocross Disc Fork Ele ===
- material: grade 9 ti
- weight: 790g (steerer uncut)
- wheel size: 700C
- diameter: 1 1/8" or 1 1/8" - 1.25" or 1 1/8" - 1.5"
- max. tyre size: 700Cx40
- max. rotor size: 160mm
- rake: 47mm
- axle to crown: 395mm
- steerer length: 270mm
- dropouts: quick release or thru axle
- floating postmount
- hand polished
- sandblasted decals
- handcrafted in Europe

== Awards and nominations ==
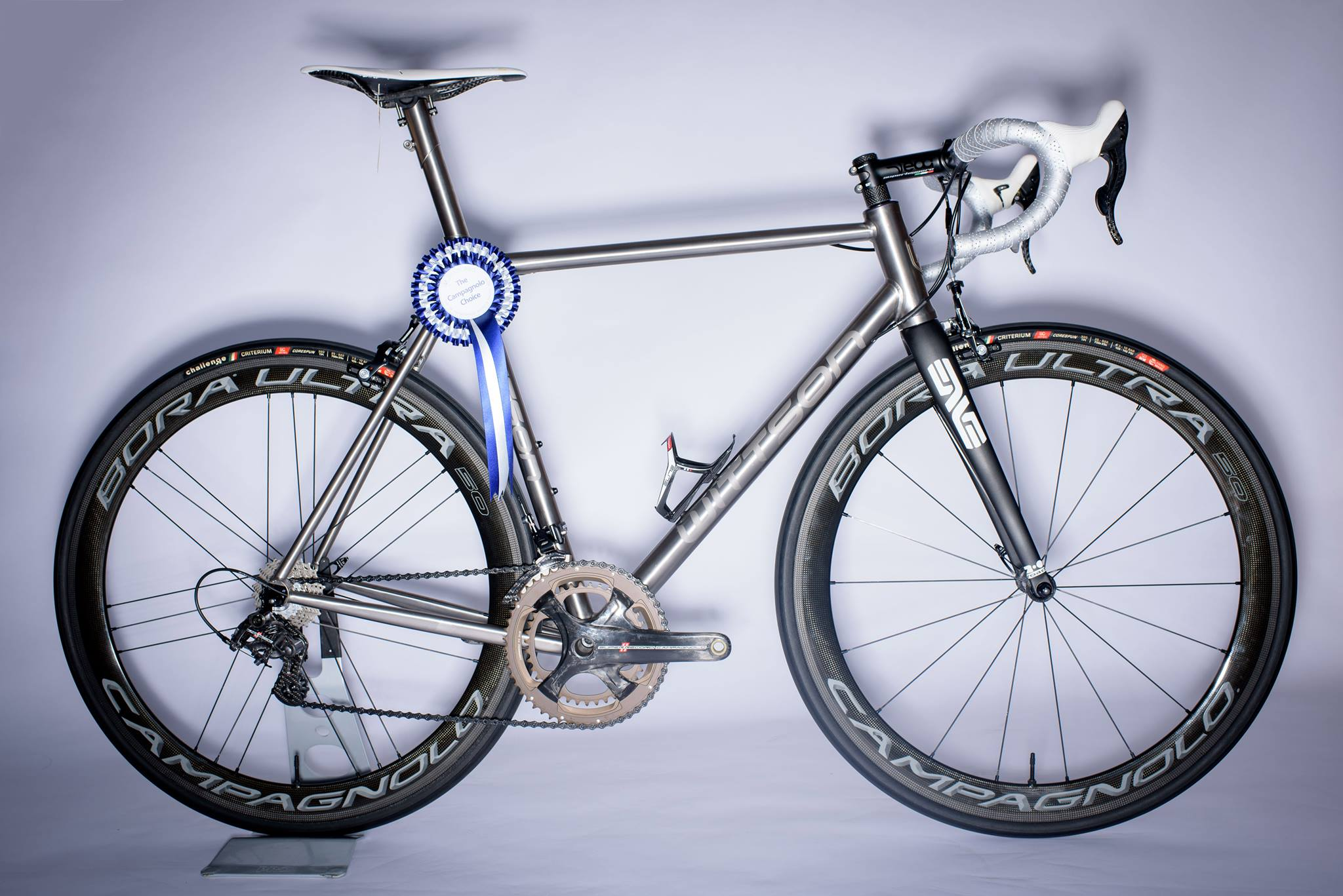
The Campagnolo Choice Award-winning Suppresio by Wittson Custom Ti Cycles

In April 2017 Wittson's Suppresio won the Campagnolo Choice Award at the Bespoked UK Handmade Bicycle Show in Bristol, UK.

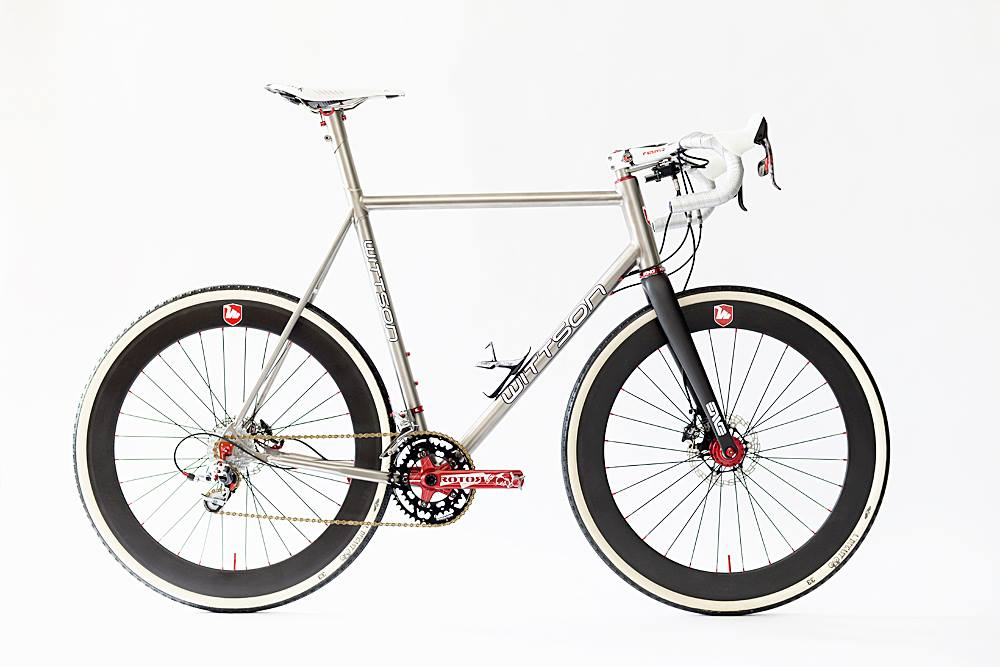
The award-winning Custom CX 001 by Wittson Custom Ti Cycles

In 2014 Wittson won The National Lithuanian Design Award for its Custom CX 001 bicycle. The award was handed in to Vidmantas and Mindaugas Zukauskas by Lithuanian President Dalia Grybauskaite at the Presidential Palace in Vilnius, Lithuania.

Wittson Custom CX 001 Specifications:

- cyclocross disc frame
- oversized headtube for conical 1.5" fork
- integrated seatpost with a support on toptube/seatsatays cross section
- ti seatmast
- integrated disc cable routing
- integrated shifting cable routing
- PressFit BB86
- bullet chainstays
- PARAGON low mount dropouts
- ti bolts
