= Waterford Precision Cycles =

American bicycle manufacturer

Waterford Precision Cycles was a small bicycle manufacturer based in Waterford, Wisconsin. Waterford produced high-end, custom, hand-built, steel-frame bicycles, particularly road, criterium, stage, track, and cyclocross racing bicycles, that ranged in price from about $2,500 to $8,500. Waterford built both TIG welded and lugged steel frames to order, and specialized in custom and unique bicycle frames.

The company was operated by Richard Schwinn, formerly of Schwinn Bicycle Company, and business partner Marc Muller. Schwinn (great-grandson of Ignaz Schwinn, who founded Schwinn Co. in 1896) was vice president of production for Schwinn Co., and Muller worked for Schwinn as a designer of the company's hand-crafted Paramount racing bikes.

Waterford Precision Cycles and Gunnar Cycles ceased operations in June 2023 due to the upcoming retirement of owner Richard Schwinn and several other employees. Waterford Precision Bicycles was then resurrected by father and son duo, John and David Siegrist in Durango, Colorado. John Siegrist has a long background the cycling industry which includes founding DEAN Titanium Bikes in Boulder, Colorado in 1989.

== Gunnar ==
The company also manufactured Gunnar Cycles, which were steel-alloy, TIG welded bicycle frames and forks including off-road, touring, racing and recreational bicycles, that started at roughly $1500 for a frame and fork combination. Unlike a custom Waterford frame, they did not offer custom sizing which helped keep the price lower.

== Others ==
In addition, Waterford manufactured frames for Rivendell Bicycle Works, Salsa Cycles, Milwaukee Bicycle Co. and Shinola Detroit as well as several other small specialty bicycle companies.
