= Quartet (sculpture) =

Public art work by Celine Farrell

- Artist: Celine Farrell
- Year: 2008
- Type: steel
- Location: Milwaukee, Wisconsin; 43.003°N 87.929824°W
- Owner: Lincoln Avenue BID

Quartet is a public art work by artist Celine Farrell located on the south side of Milwaukee, Wisconsin. The painted steel sculpture consists of four panels radiating out from a center point. Each panel is painted a different color and has shapes cut out to represent the four seasons. It is located at West Windlake Avenue and West Lincoln Avenue west of Kosciuszko Park in the Lincoln Village neighborhood. A derivative sculpture was created by recycling the cut away elements; this work is installed nearby at Ben's Cycle and Fitness, maker of Milwaukee Bicycles.
