= Fyxation =

Bicycle company in Milwaukee, Wisconsin

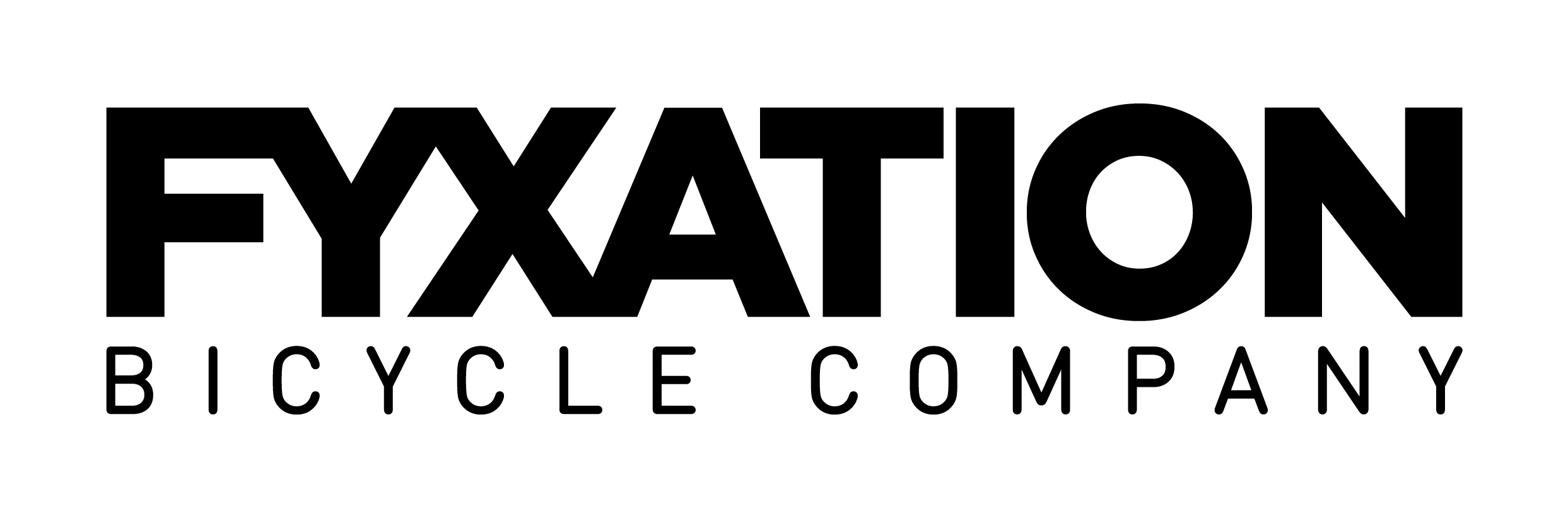
- Type: Private
- Industry: Bicycles
- Founded: 2009; 17 years ago
- Headquarters: Milwaukee, Wisconsin, USA
- Key people: Nick and Ben Ginster
- Products: Bicycle and Related Components
- Website: www.fyxation.com

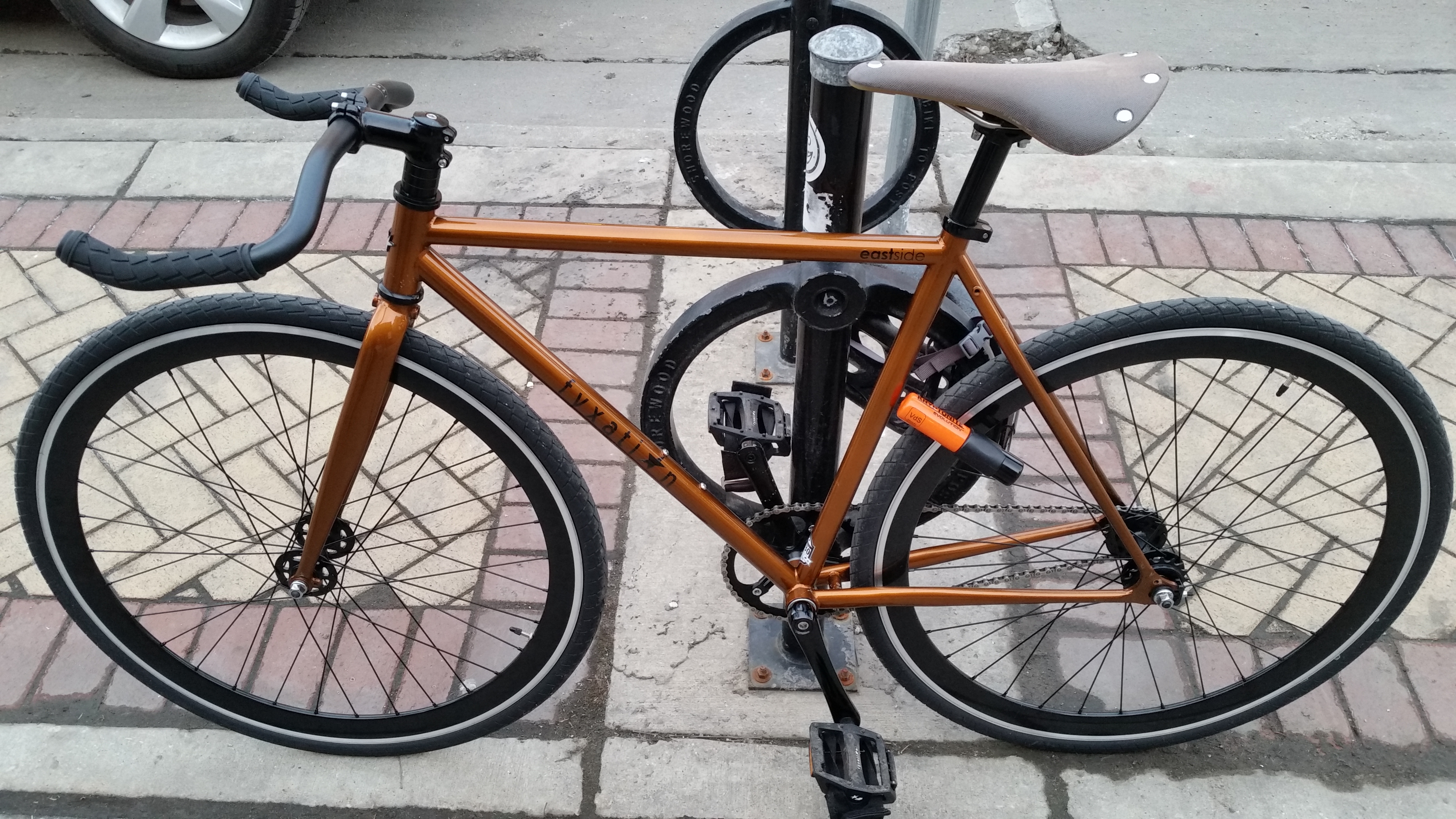
Fyxation Eastside bicycle

Fyxation was a bicycle company based in Milwaukee, Wisconsin, founded by Nick and Ben Ginster in 2009. The initial products were pedals, handlebars, saddles, and tires. This has been expanded to include frames, complete bicycles, and leather beer and wine caddies. Bicycle models include fixed-gear, cyclo-cross, and fatbikes.

Fyxation entered a distribution agreement with QBP in 2011. Fyxation opened a retail location in the Silver City section of Milwaukee, adjacent to the Hank Aaron Trail, in 2013, and they moved to the Riverwest neighborhood in the spring of 2015.

== Gallery ==
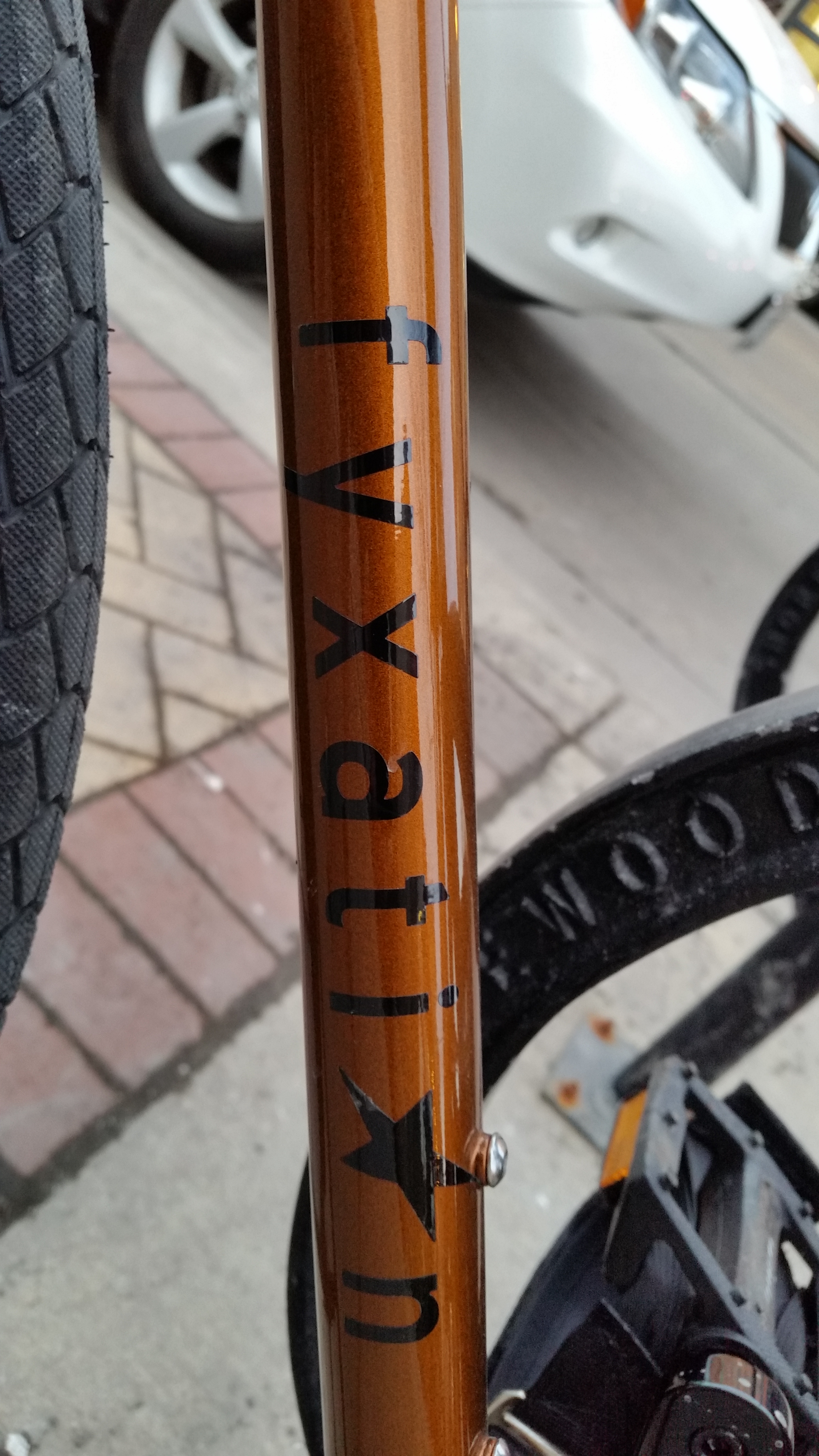
Fyxation bicycle logo on down tube

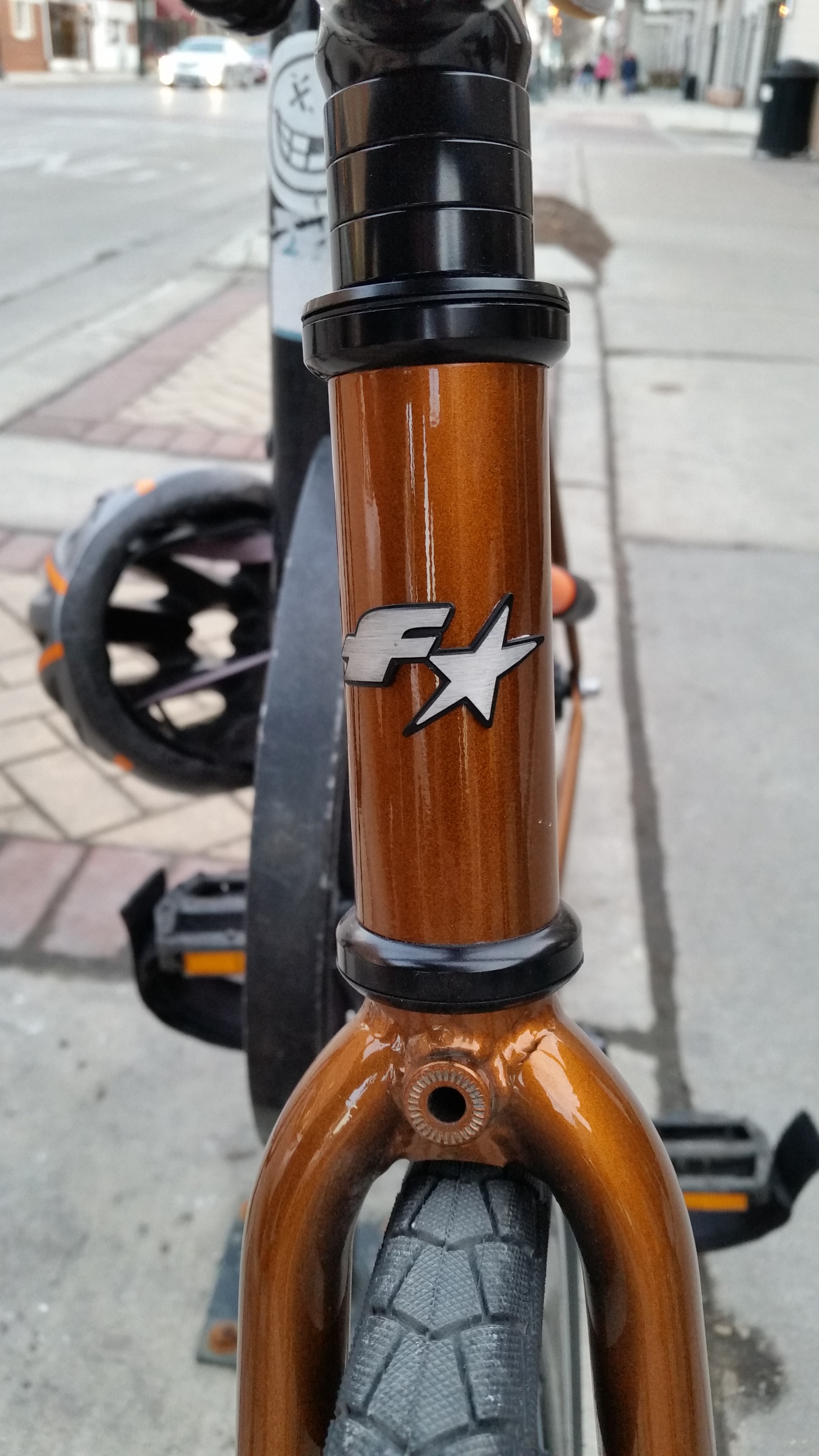
Fyxation bicycle head badge

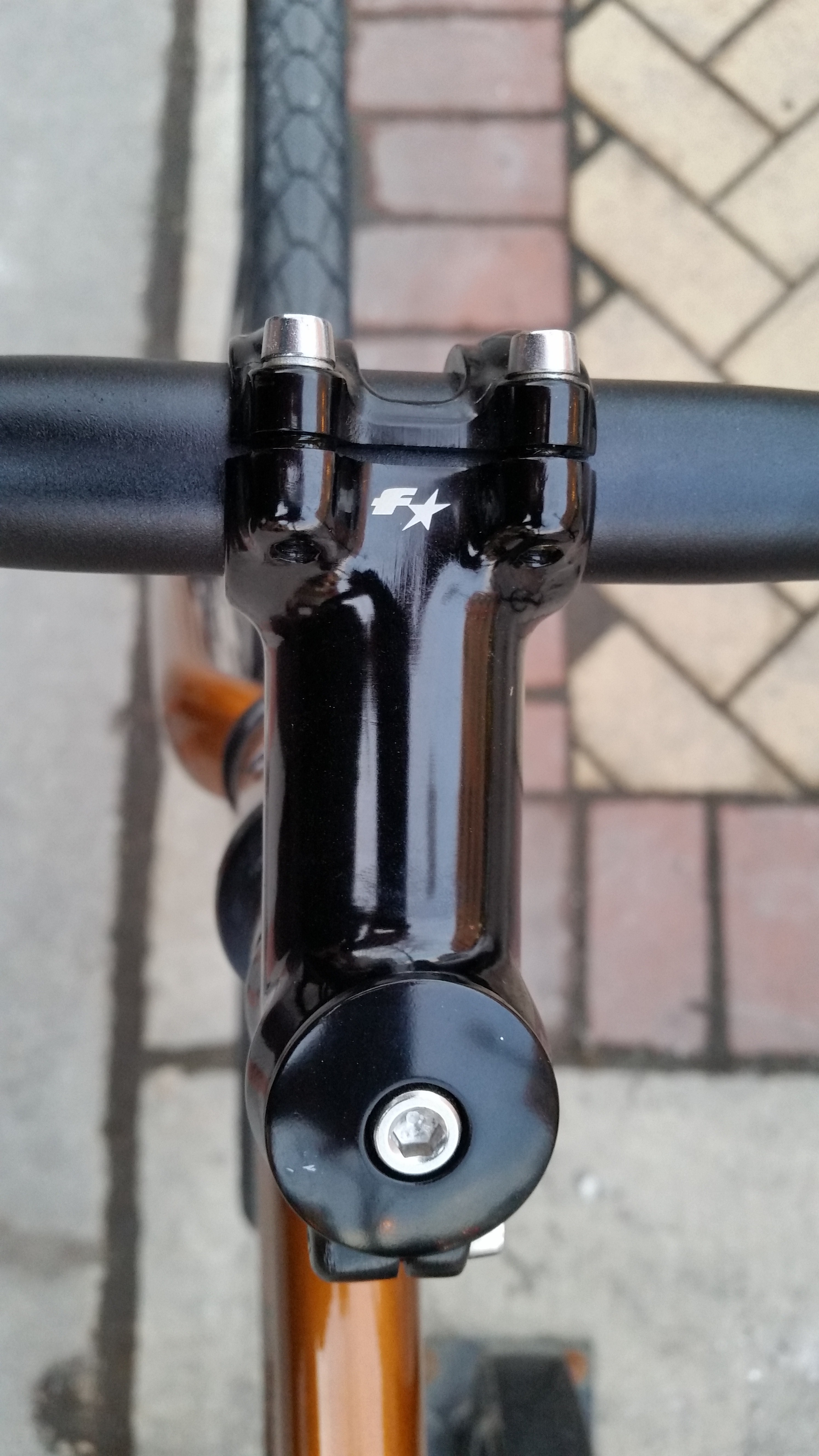
Fyxation bicycle stem

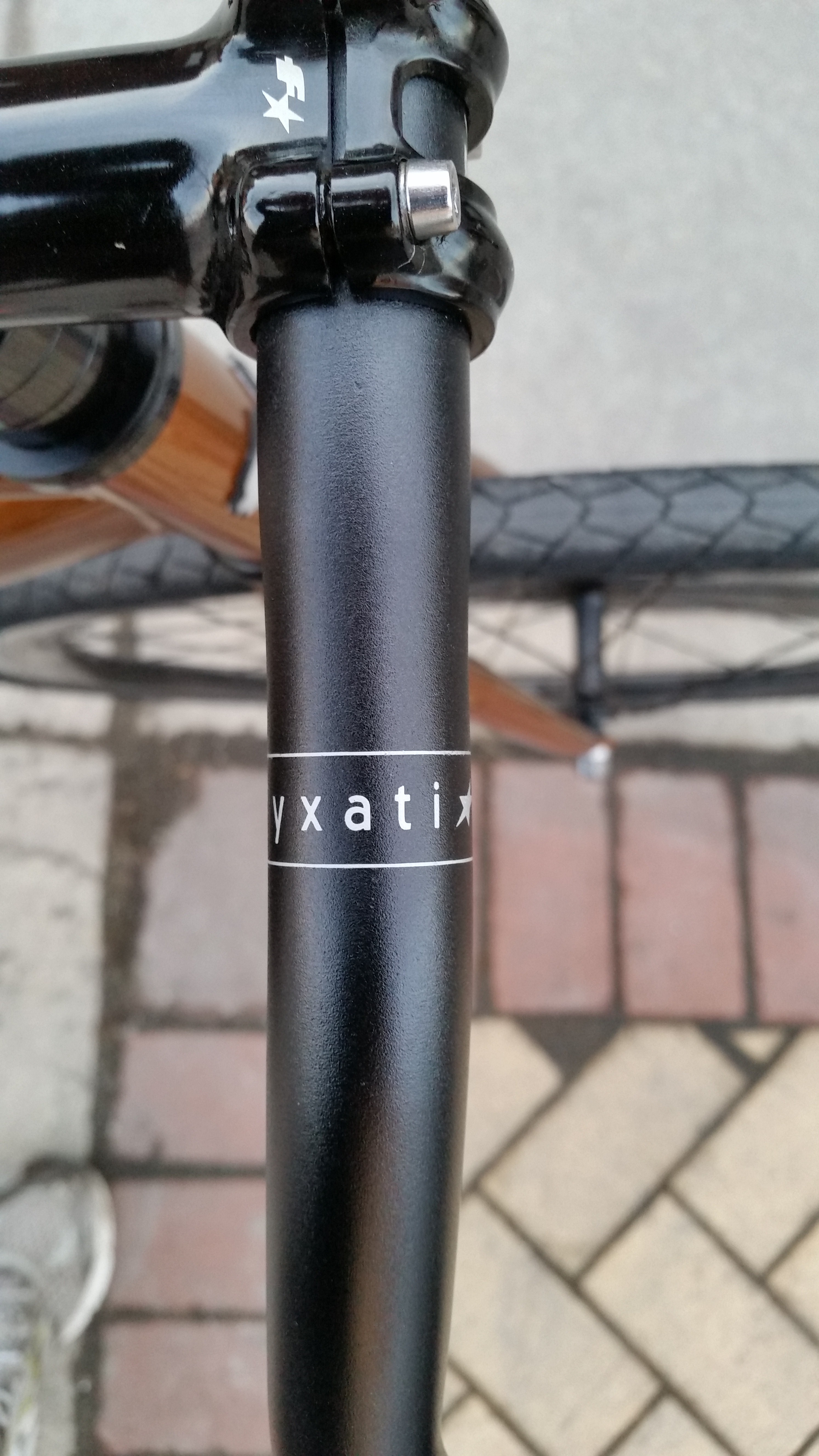
Fyxation bicycle handlebar

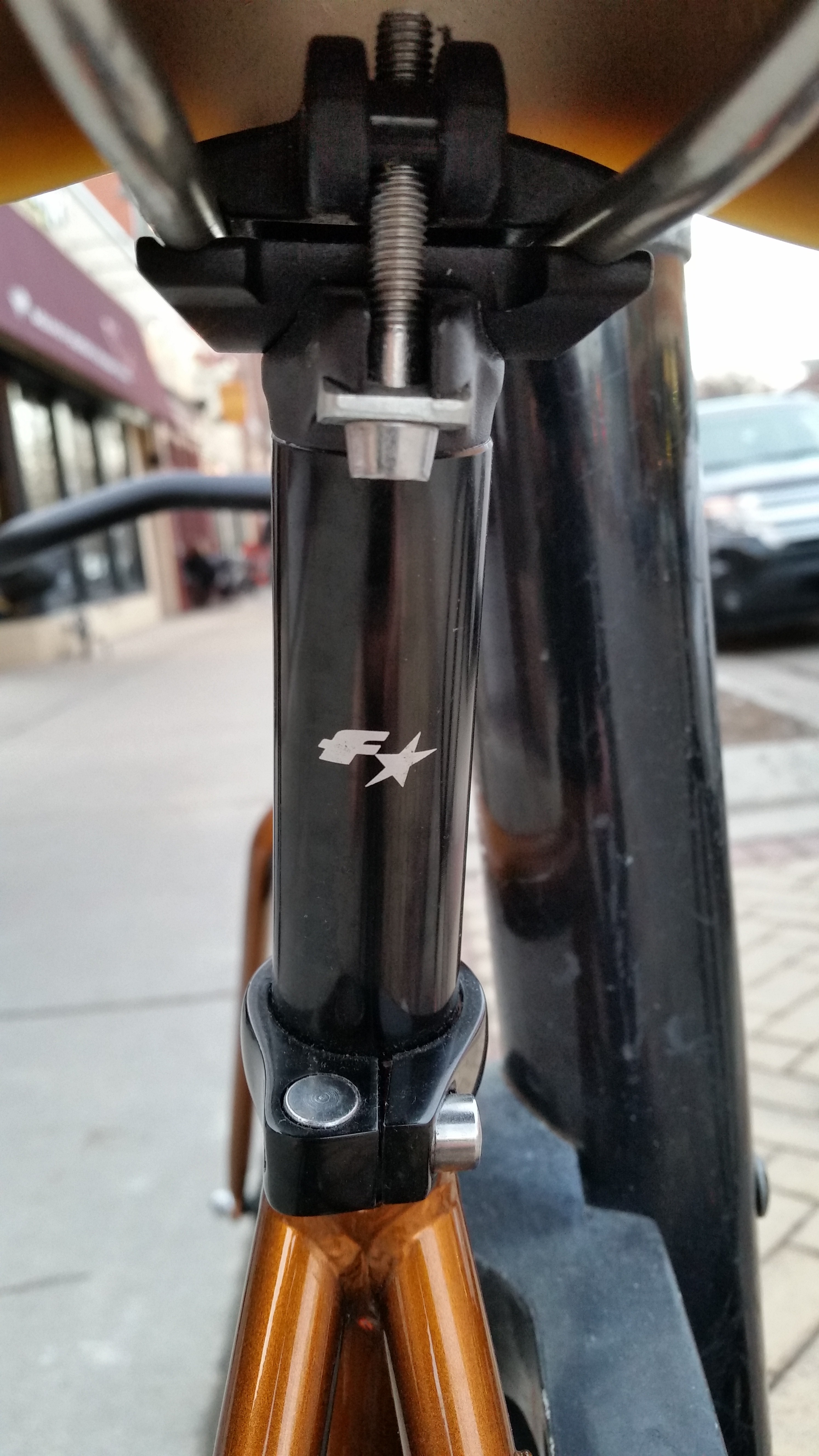
Fyxation bicycle seatpost

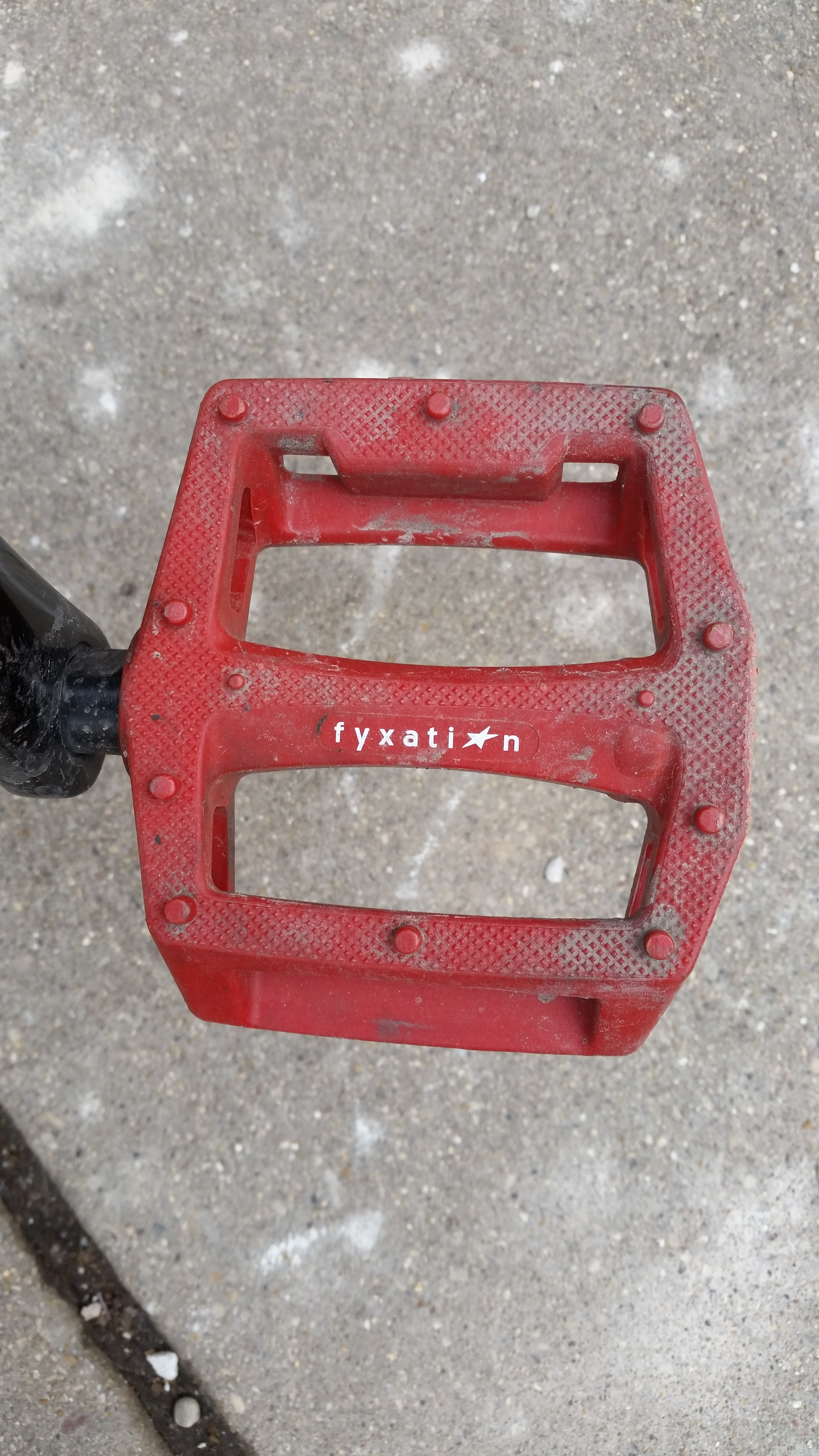
Fyxation bicycle pedal

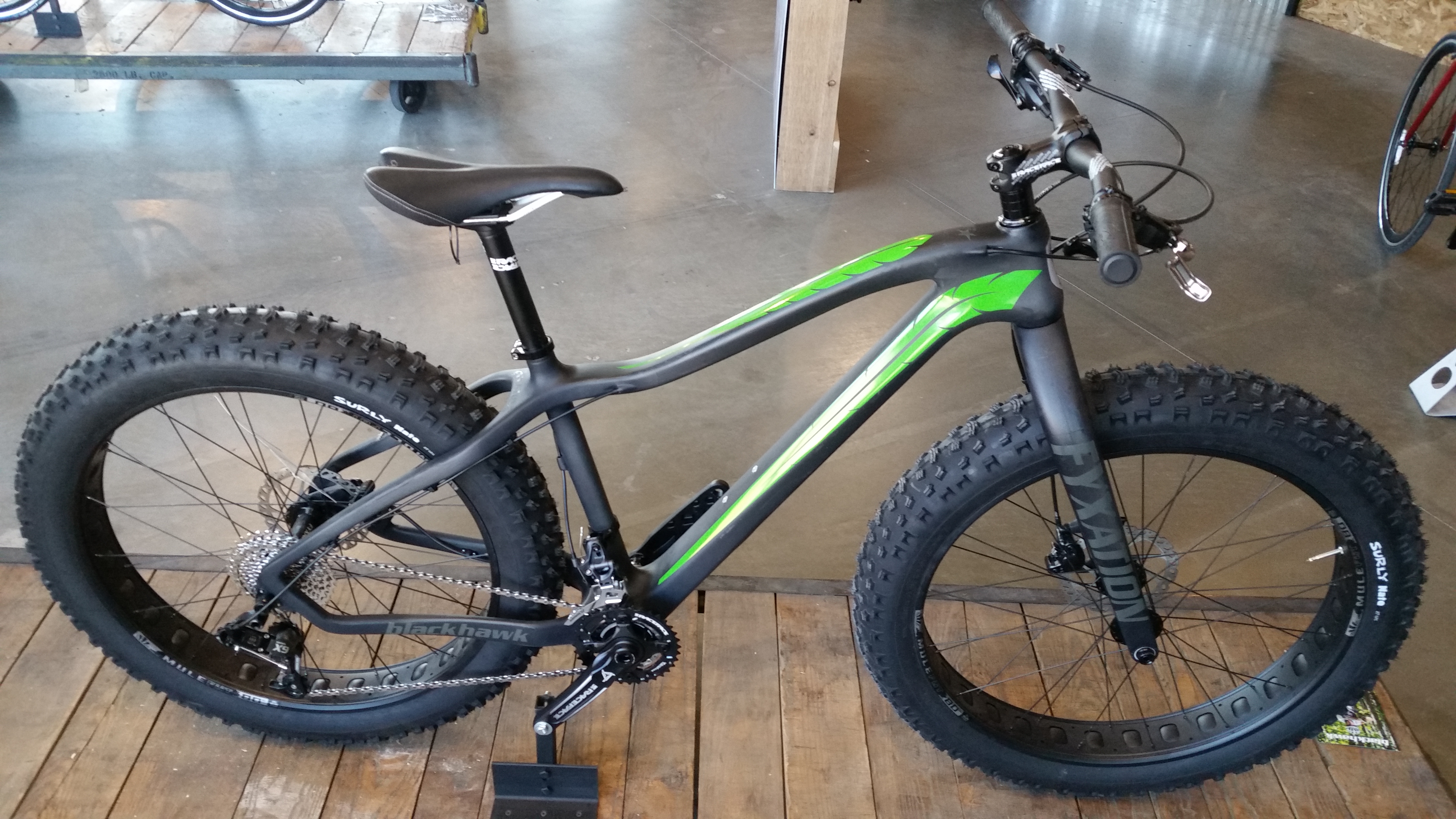
Fyxation Blackhawk fatbike

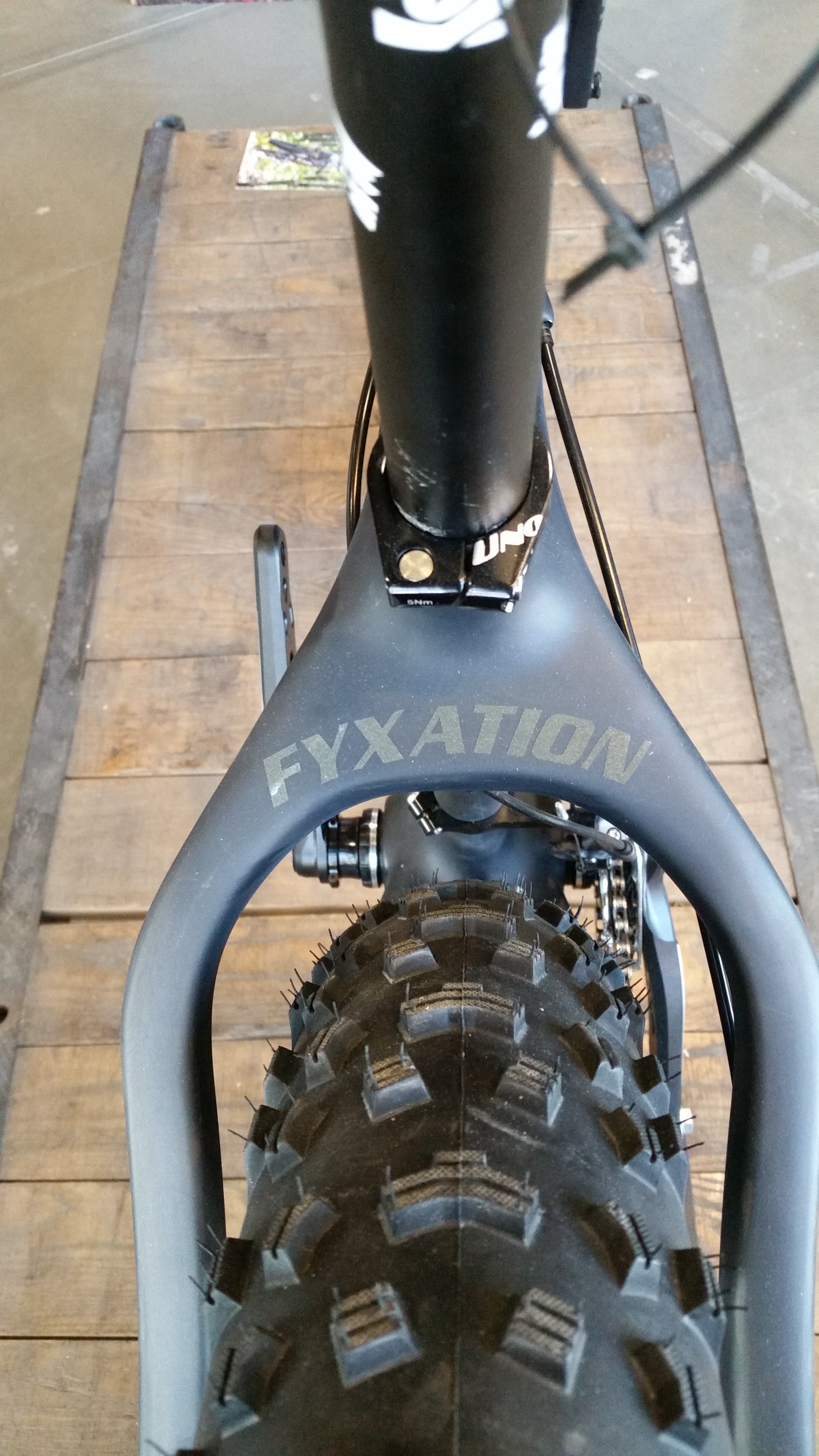
Fyxation Blackhawk fatbike detail

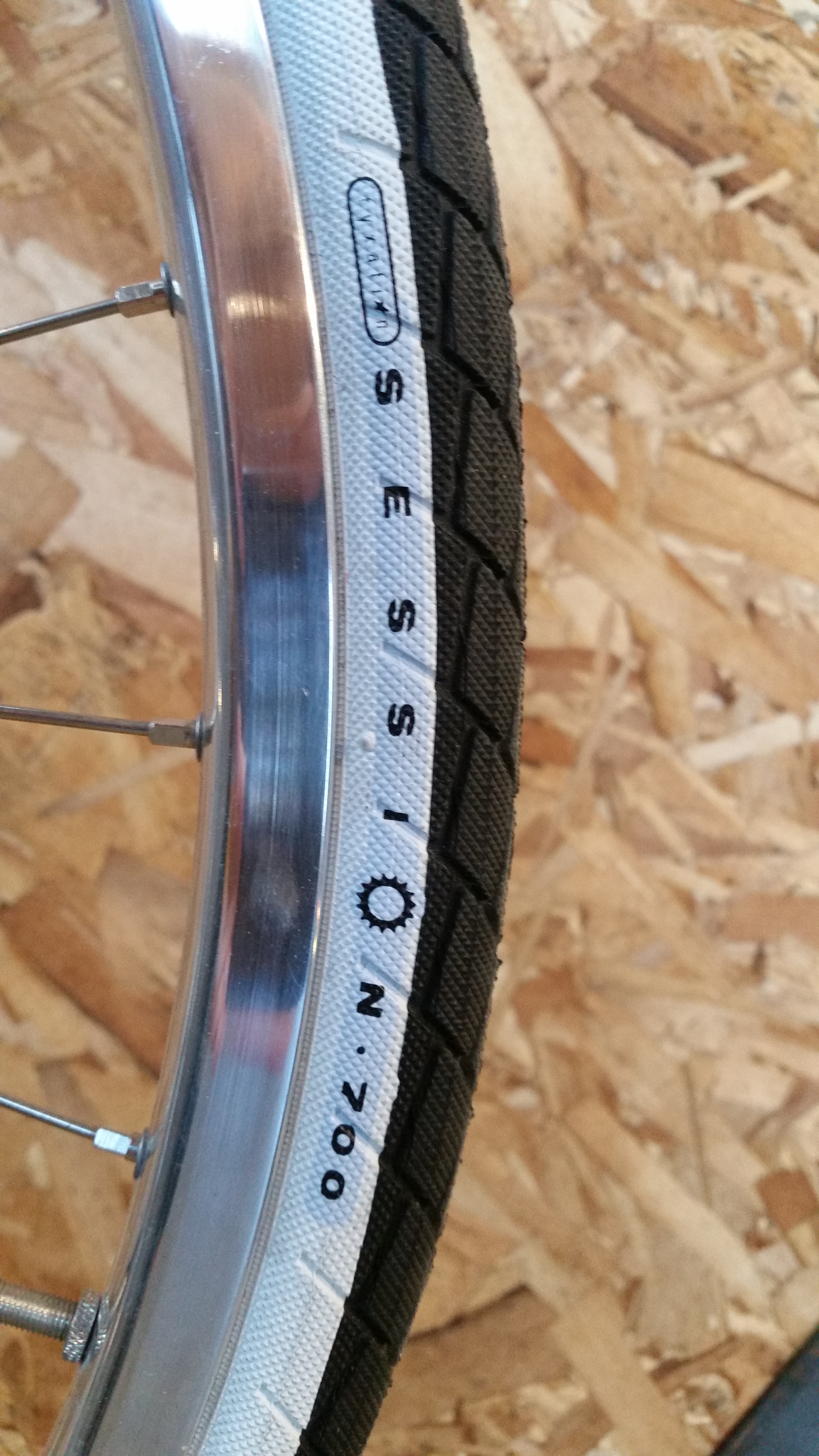
Fyxation Session tire

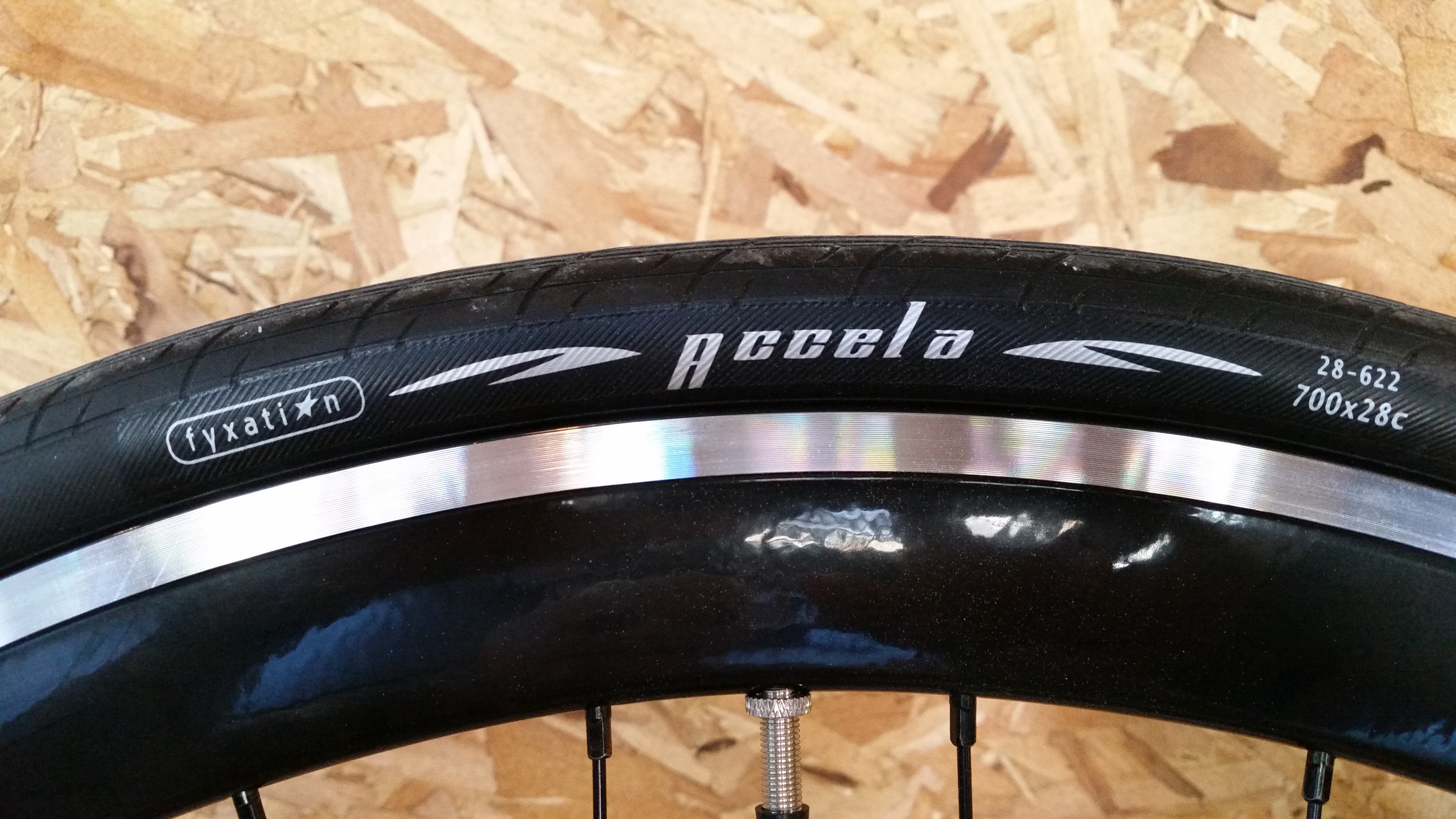
Fyxation Accela tire

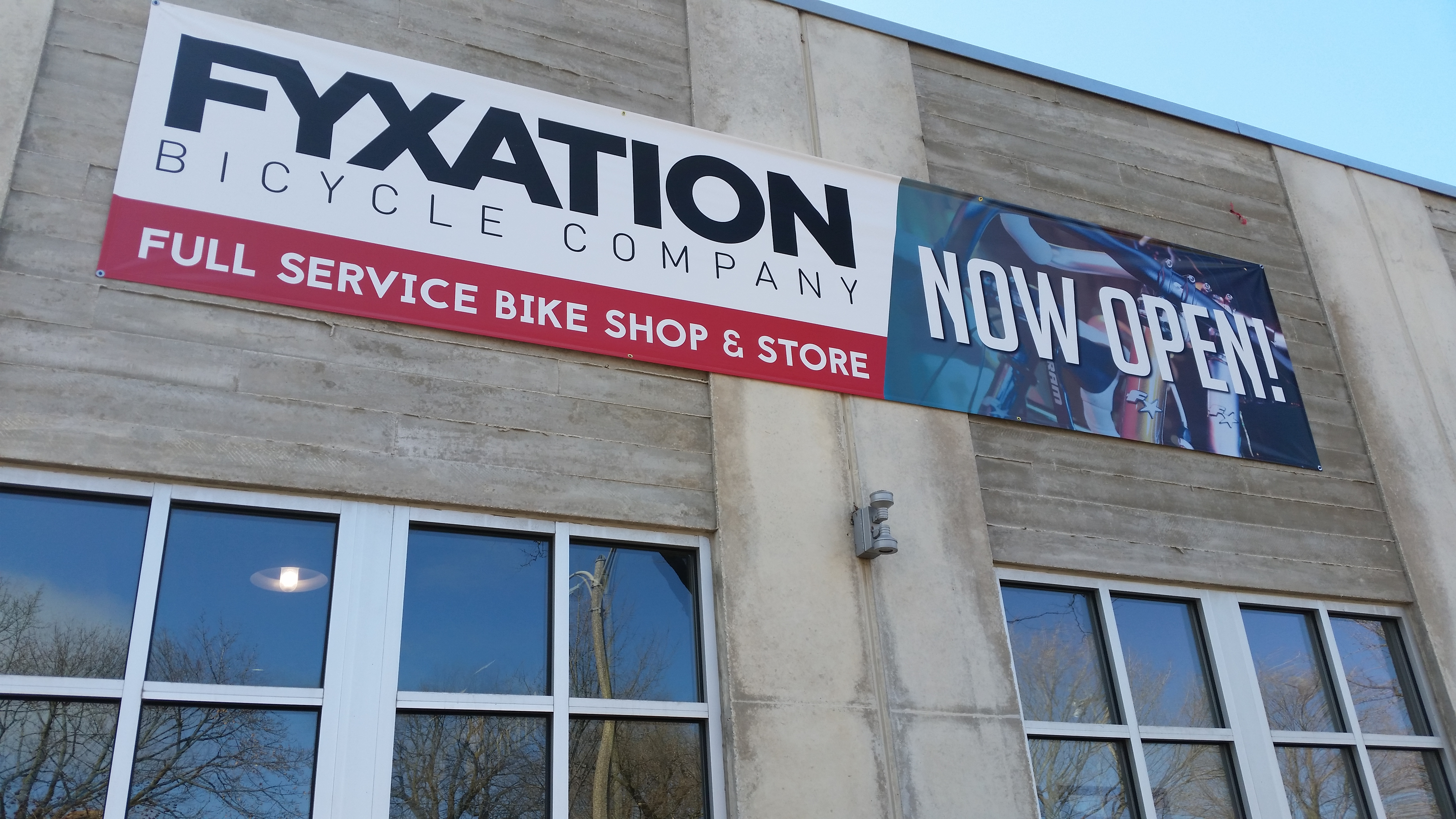
Fyxation retail space

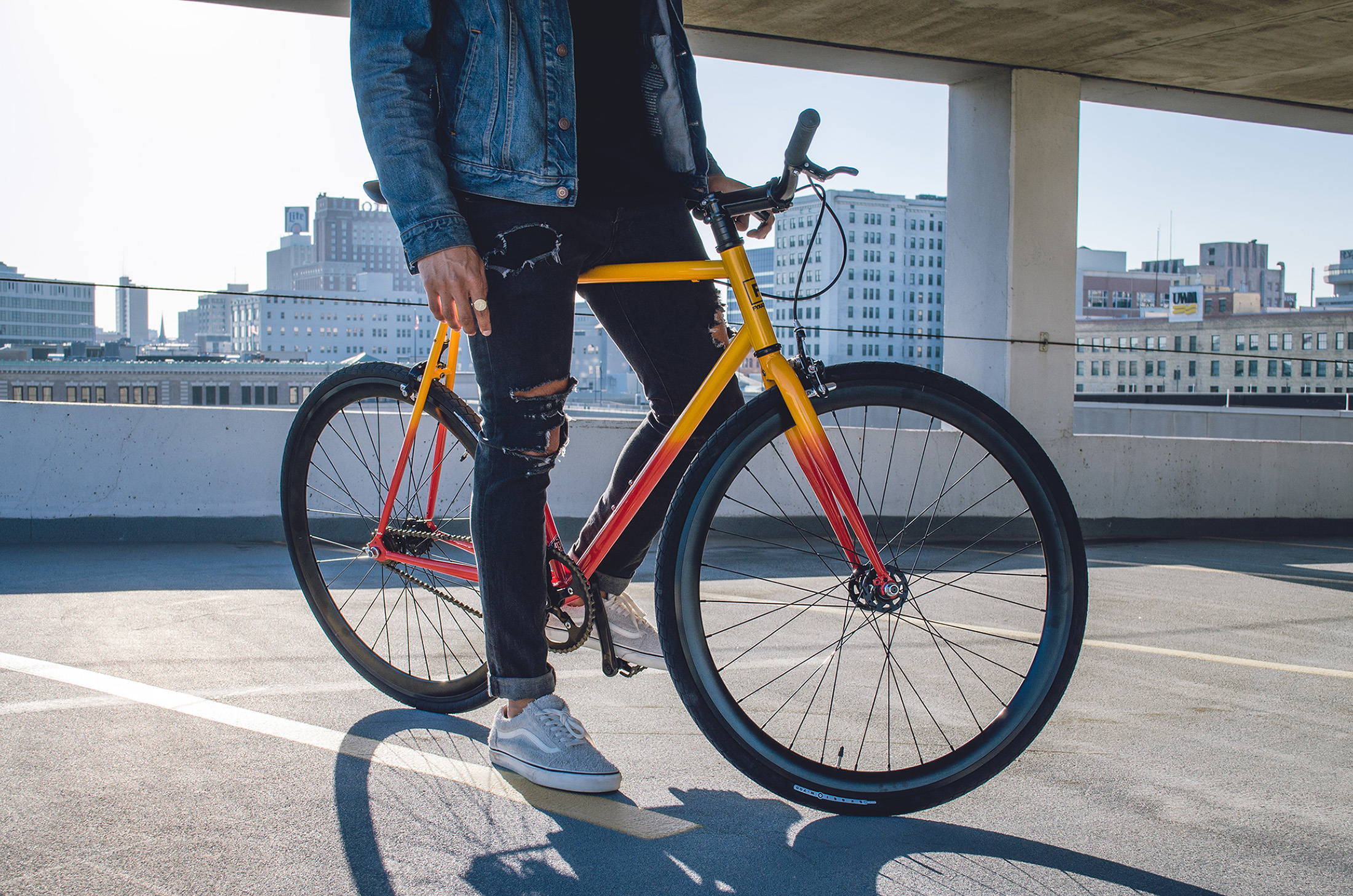
2018 Eastside Fire Fade

== See also ==
- Milwaukee Bicycle Co.
