= Bicycle Technologies International =

American bicycle parts distribution company

Bicycle Technologies International (BTI)
- Company type: Private
- Industry: Bicycle parts and accessories distribution
- Founded: 1993; 33 years ago
- Headquarters: Santa Fe, NM, United States
- Key people: Andrew Wright, Founder Preston Martin, Founder
- Website: www.bti-usa.com

Bicycle Technologies International Ltd (BTI) is an American-based company which specialises in the distribution of bicycle parts and accessories. The headquarters are located in Santa Fe, New Mexico, United States.

== History ==
BTI's first wholesale catalog, also released in 1993, was a twenty four page newsprint flyer with hand-illustrated schematic drawings of every major fork design. From the beginning, BTI fostered a close relationship with early suspension manufacturers, offering a full line of replacement components. Today BTI provides suspension repair, tuning and other authorized warranty center services for 18 major brands.

By 1996, the company was looking for a more central location from where they could serve dealers on both coasts. With the help of friends the young company packed up its inventory and relocated to Santa Fe, New Mexico.

Over time, BTI expanded its selection with more shop essentials covering every aspect of the modern bicycle. BTI now stocks over 22,000 unique SKUs from nearly 300 brands.

=== New Facility ===
In June 2012, BTI publicly unveiled its plans for a new facility. The company announced plans to make a significant investment in a new 47,500 square foot building that will expand the current warehouse operation and will bring two other facilities back under one roof. New Mexico.Gov. Susana Martinez spoke at the event, praising BTI for creating quality jobs in the state. Santa Fe City Councilwoman Rebecca Wurzberger said BTI was the type of locally grown, green company that Santa Fe wants to attract not only for job creation, but for community building activities as well. She cited BTI's role in organizing the 2012 IMBA World Summit in Santa Fe as an example.

Situated on a recently purchased plot of land 5 miles from the current warehouse, BTI's new facility will be the anchor tenant for a new master plan employment zone located next to the Santa Fe Community College and near Rancho Viejo. Architectural plans for this site have been completed by Dekker/Parich/ Sabatini Architects. Klinger Constructors LLC has been contracted to undertake construction upon BTI's acquisition of the property.
