= Schwinn Paramount =

High-end racing bicycle

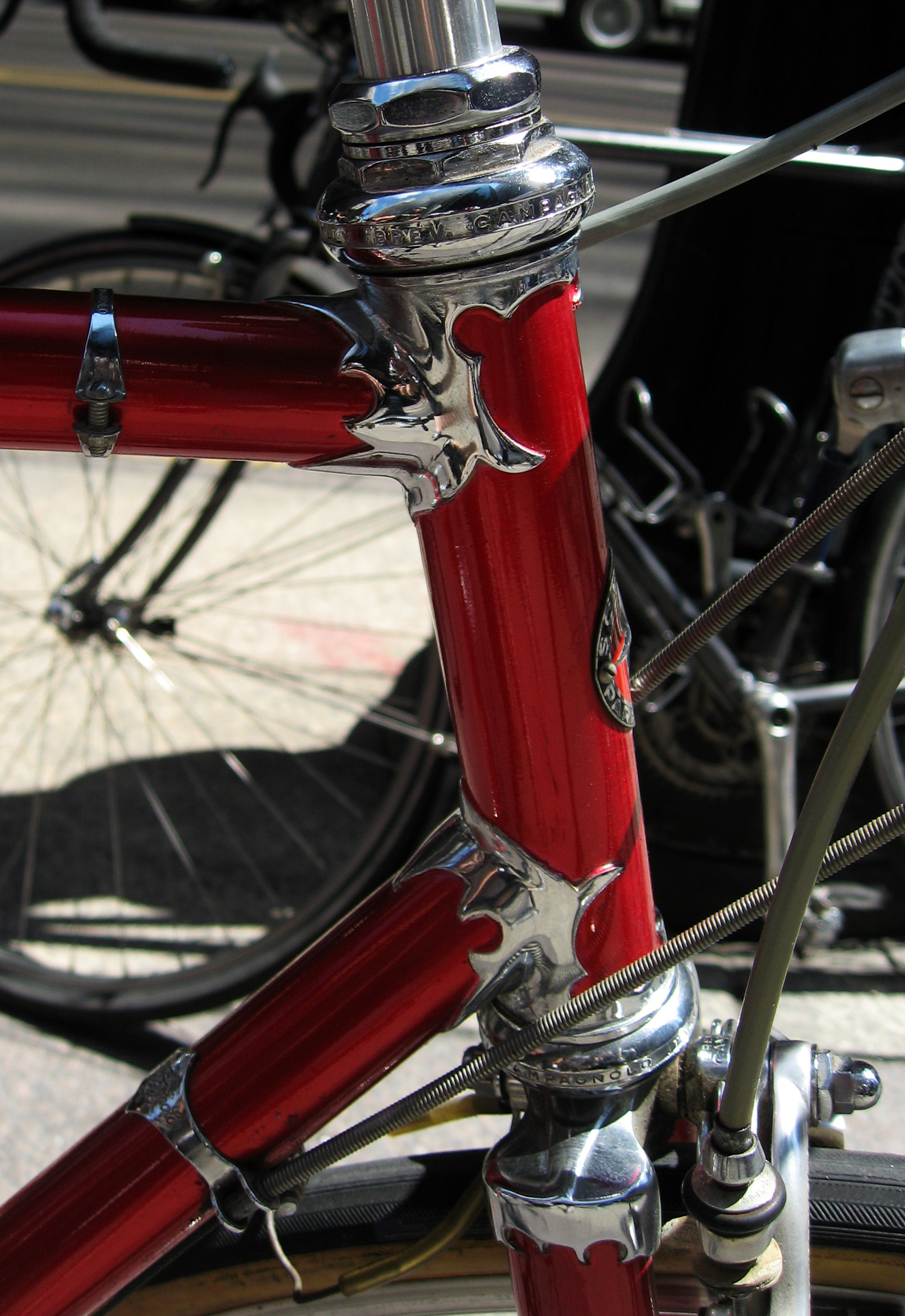
Schwinn Paramount head tube showing Nervex lugs and Campagnolo headset

The Schwinn Paramount was a high-end racing bicycle produced under the Schwinn Bicycle Company brand from 1938 through 2009.

== Racing roots ==
In the 1930s, Schwinn sponsored a bicycle racing team headed by Emil Wastyn, who designed the team bikes, and the company competed in six-day racing across the United States with riders such as Jerry Rodman and Russell Allen. In 1938, Frank W. Schwinn officially introduced the Paramount series. Developed from experiences gained in racing, Schwinn established Paramount as their answer to high-end, professional competition bicycles. The Paramount used high-strength chrome-molybdenum steel alloy tubing and expensive brass lug-brazed construction. During the next twenty years, most of the Paramount bikes would be built in limited numbers at a small frame shop headed by Wastyn, in spite of Schwinn's continued efforts to bring all frame production into the factory.

On 17 May 1941, Alfred Letourneur was able to beat the motor-paced world speed record on a bicycle, reaching 108.92 miles per hour (175.29 km/h) on a Schwinn Paramount bicycle riding behind a car in Bakersfield, California.

== Classic Era ==
While many large bicycle manufacturers sponsored or participated in bicycle racing competition of some sort to keep up with the newest trends in technology, Schwinn restricted its racing activities to events inside the United States, where Schwinn bicycles predominated. As a result, Schwinns became increasingly dated in both styling and technology. By 1957, the Paramount series, once a premier racing bicycle, had atrophied from a lack of attention and modernization. Aside from some new frame lug designs, the designs, methods and tooling were the same as had been used in the 1930s. After a crash-course in new frame-building techniques and derailleur technology, Schwinn introduced an updated Paramount with Reynolds 531 double-butted tubing, Nervex lugsets and bottom bracket shells, as well as Campagnolo derailleur dropouts. The Paramount continued as a limited production model, built in small numbers in a small apportioned area of the old Chicago assembly factory. The new frame and component technology incorporated in the Paramount largely failed to reach Schwinn's mass-market bicycle lines. Another change occurred in 1963 following the death of F. W. Schwinn, when grandson Frank Valentine Schwinn took over management of the company.

In the early 1970’s, Mainland built a number of the all chrome Paramounts, using Nervex lugs. In an interview with Mainland, he indicated that his frames were very well-received by Schwinn, for their superior workmanship.

== The Ten Speed ==
A growing number of teens and young adults were purchasing imported European sport racing or sport touring bicycles, many fitted with multiple derailleur-shifted gears. Schwinn decided to meet the challenge by developing two lines of sport or road 'racer' bicycles. One was already in the catalog — the limited production Paramount series. As always, the Paramount spared no expense; the bicycles were given high-quality lightweight lugged steel frames using double-butted tubes of Reynolds 531 and fitted with quality European components including Campagnolo derailleurs, hubs, and gears. The Paramount series had limited production numbers, making vintage examples quite rare today.

== The Bicycle Boom ==
The period of 1965–1975 saw adult cycling increase sharply in popularity. More and more cyclists, especially younger buyers, began to insist on stronger steel alloys (which allowed for lighter frames), responsive frame geometry, aluminum components, advanced derailleur shifting, and multiple gears. While the Paramount sold in limited numbers to this market, the model's customer base began to age, changing from primarily bike racers to older, wealthier riders looking for the ultimate bicycle. Schwinn sold an impressive 1.5 million bicycles in 1974, but would pay the price for failing to keep up with new developments in bicycle technology and buying trends.

Schwinn also marketed a top-shelf touring model from Panasonic, the World Voyager, lugged with butted Tange chrome-molybdenum alloy tubing, Shimano derailleurs, and SunTour bar-end shifters, a serious challenge to the Paramount series at half the price.

Schwinn brand loyalty began to suffer as huge numbers of buyers came to retailers asking for the latest sport and racing road bikes from European or Japanese manufacturers. By 1979, even the Paramount had been passed, technologically speaking, by a new generation of American as well as foreign custom bicycle manufacturers.

== Transfer of Ownership ==
In 1993, Richard Schwinn, great-grandson of Ignaz Schwinn, with business partner Marc Muller, purchased the Schwinn Paramount plant in Waterford, Wisconsin, where Paramounts were built since 1980. They founded Waterford Precision Cycles, which produced the Paramount for Schwinn until September 1994 when the line was retired.

In late 1997, Questor Partners Fund purchased Schwinn Bicycles (and later GT Bicycles) and in 1998 reintroduced the Paramount line. In 2001, Schwinn/GT declared bankruptcy and was acquired by Pacific Cycle and later Dorel Industries, who marketed the Paramount line through 2009.
