= Bicycle industry =

Production, sale, and upkeep of bicycles

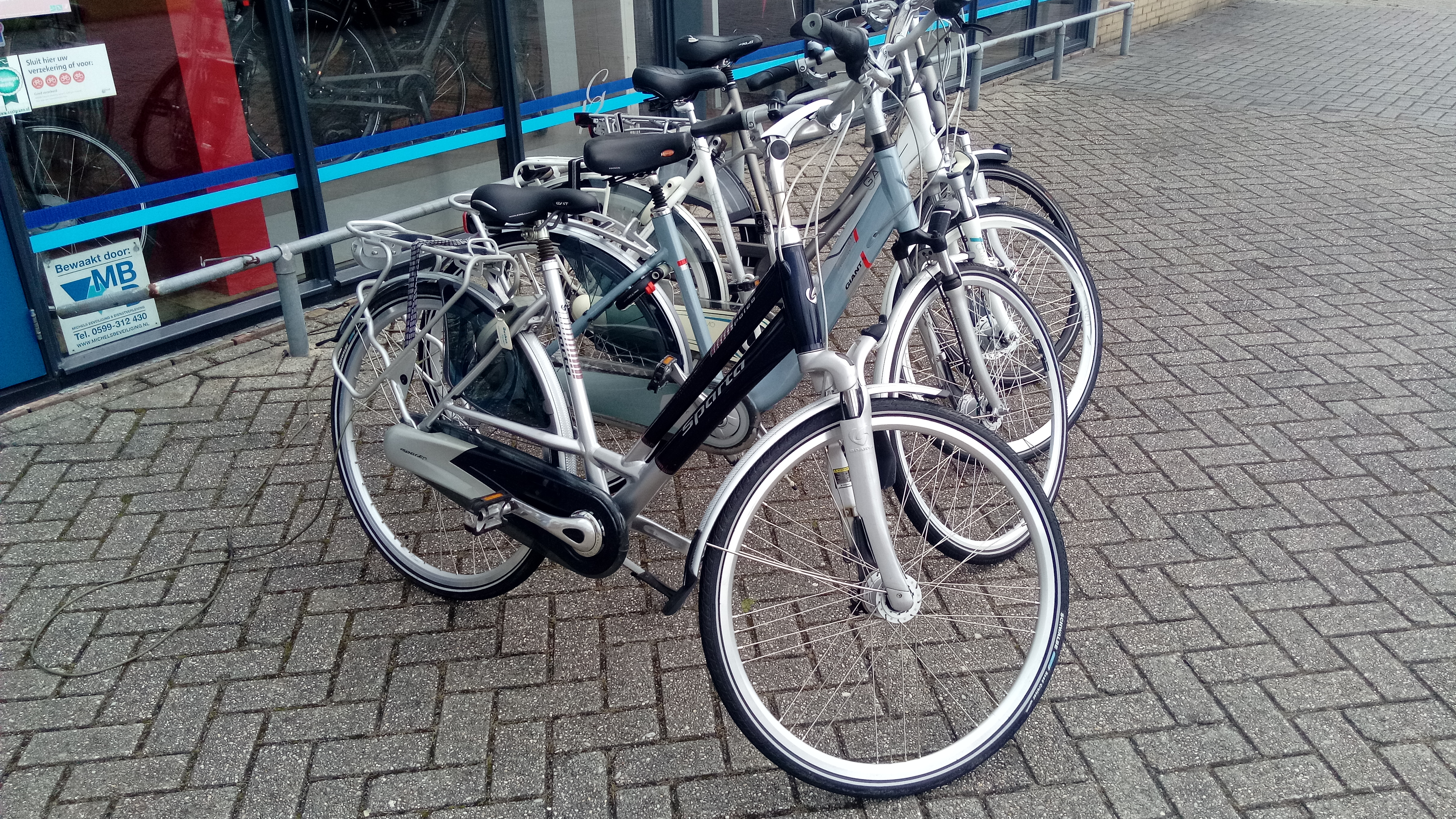
A bicycle shop displays bikes for sale.

The bicycle industry or cycling industry can broadly be defined as the industry concerned with bicycles and cycling. It includes at least bicycle manufacturers, part or component manufacturers, and accessory manufacturers. It can also include distributors, retailers, bicycle organizations, bicycle event promoters, and bicycle related service providers.

The global bicycle industry generated sales of $66 billion in 2024.

== Distribution ==
=== Bicycle and component distributors ===
- Bicycle Technologies International
- Quality Bicycle Products

=== Local bicycle and component retailers ===
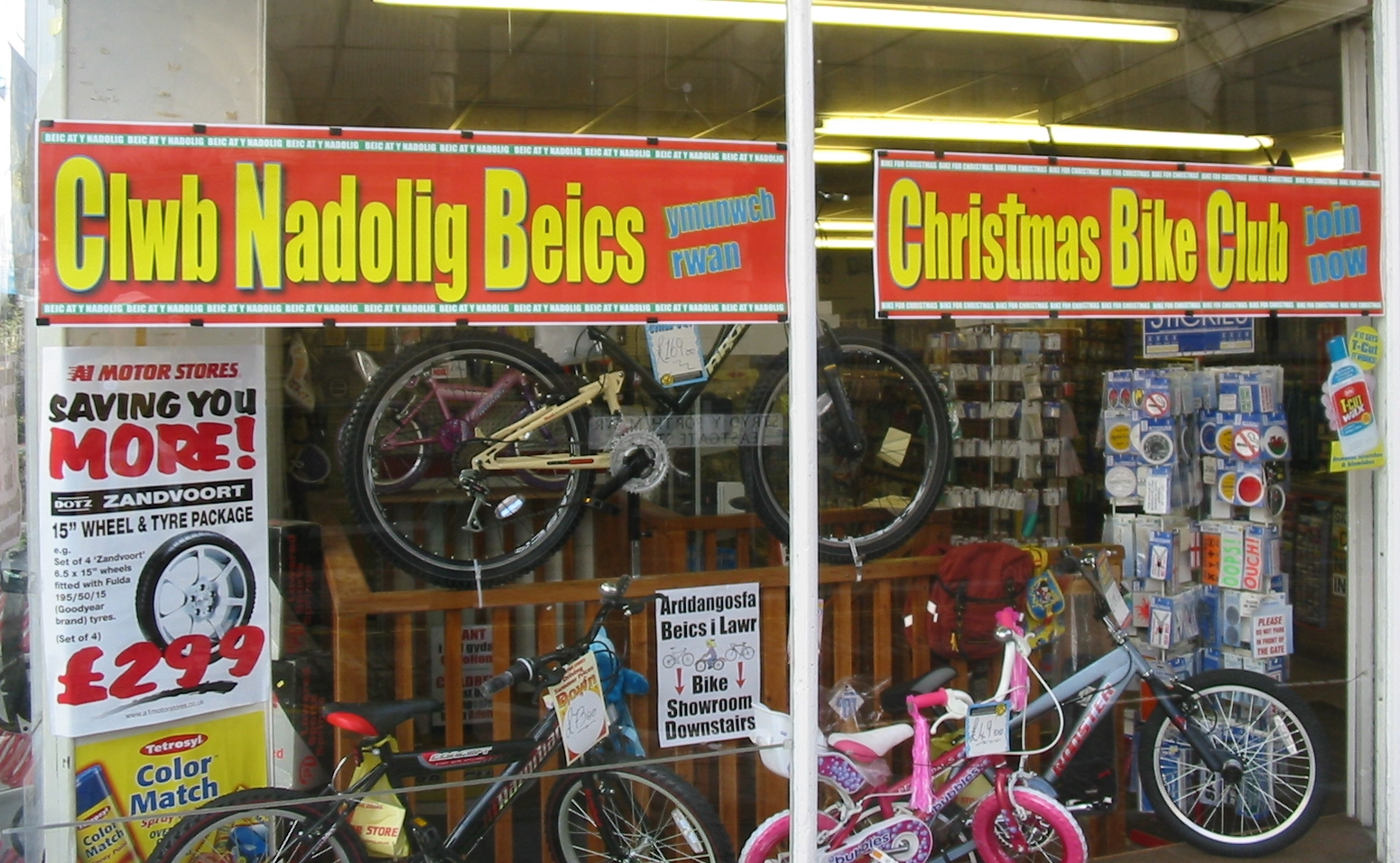
A local bike shop

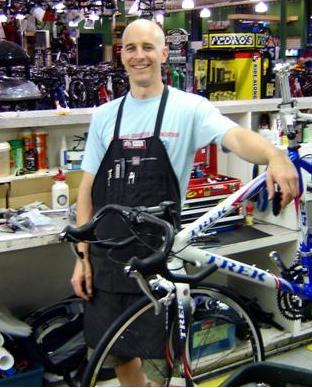
A bicycle mechanic at a local bike shop

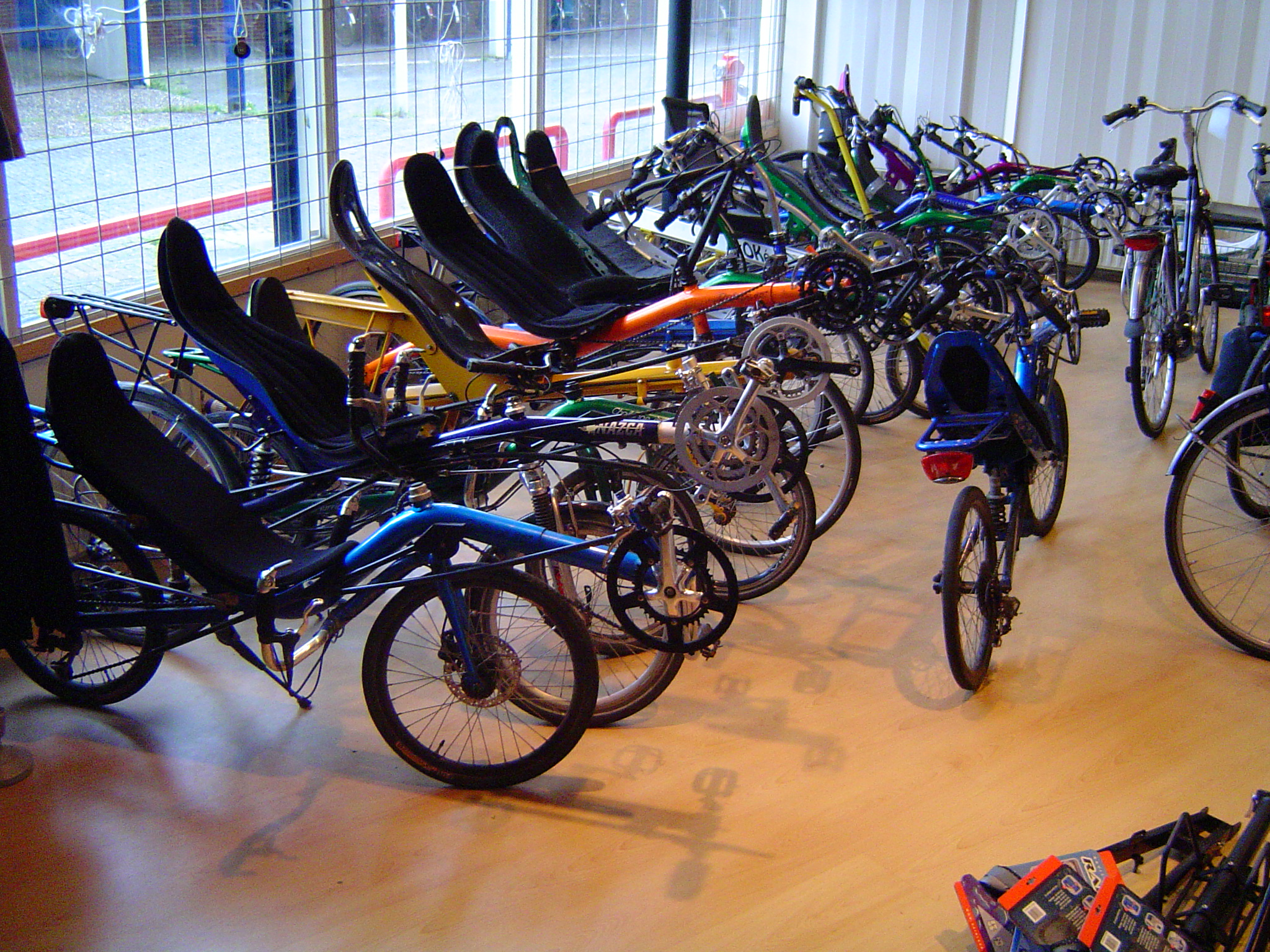
View of recumbent bicycles inside a local bike shop

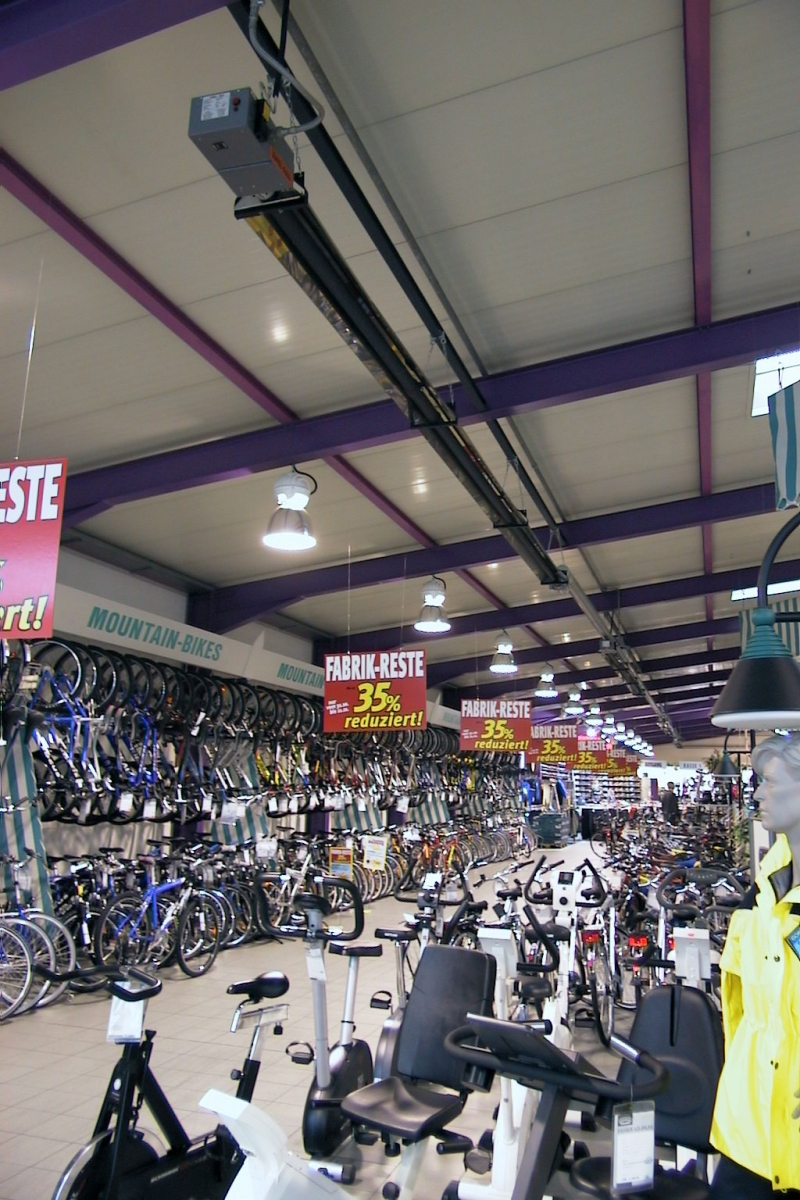
Bicycles and exercise equipment for sale inside a local bike shop

A bike shop or bicycle shop is a business specializing in bicycle sales, maintenance bike parts and accessories. Bike shops may be small businesses, Chain stores, mail-order or online vendors. Local bike shops (sometimes abbreviated LBS) are a key component of the bicycle industry as they provide repair and service in additionto retail sales. In recognition of the value that local bike shops provide, some manufacturers only sell their bicycles through dealerships. In the UK and Ireland, the expression independent bicycle dealers (IBDs) is also used. Shops may also specialize on one or more aspects of cycling: bicycle racing, triathlon, bicycle touring, BMX, mountain biking, etc.

== Services and events ==
=== Trade ===
- Interbike
- Frostbike
- Eurobike

== Advocacy ==
Besides advocating for greater safety, comfort, and convenience for bicyclists, many members of the industry promote bicycles for poverty alleviation. Experiments done in Africa (Uganda and Tanzania) and Sri Lanka on hundreds of households have shown that a bicycle can increase the income of a poor family by as much as 35%. Transport, if analyzed for the cost-benefit analysis for rural poverty alleviation, has given one of the best returns in this regard. For example, road investments in India were a staggering 3-10 times more effective than almost all other investments and subsidies in rural economy in the decade of the 1990s. What a road does at a macro level to increase transport, the bicycle supports at the micro level. The bicycle, in that sense, can be one of the best means to eradicate poverty in poor nations.

World Bicycle Relief, which specializes in large-scale, comprehensive bicycle distribution programs to aid poverty relief and disaster recovery initiatives in developing countries around the world, includes among its sponsors such notable companies as Accell Group, Bicycle Technologies International, Giant Bicycles, GT Bicycles, Quality Bicycle Products, Shimano, SRAM Corporation, Specialized Bicycle Components, and Trek Bicycle Corporation.

== Publications ==
Notable publications about bicycles and cycling include:

- Bicycle Quarterly
- Bicycling

== See also ==
- French bicycle industry
- List of bicycle manufacturers
- List of bicycle part manufacturers
- Local bike shop
