= Quality Bicycle Products =

US importer and distributor of bicycles and bicycle components

Quality Bicycle Products (QBP)

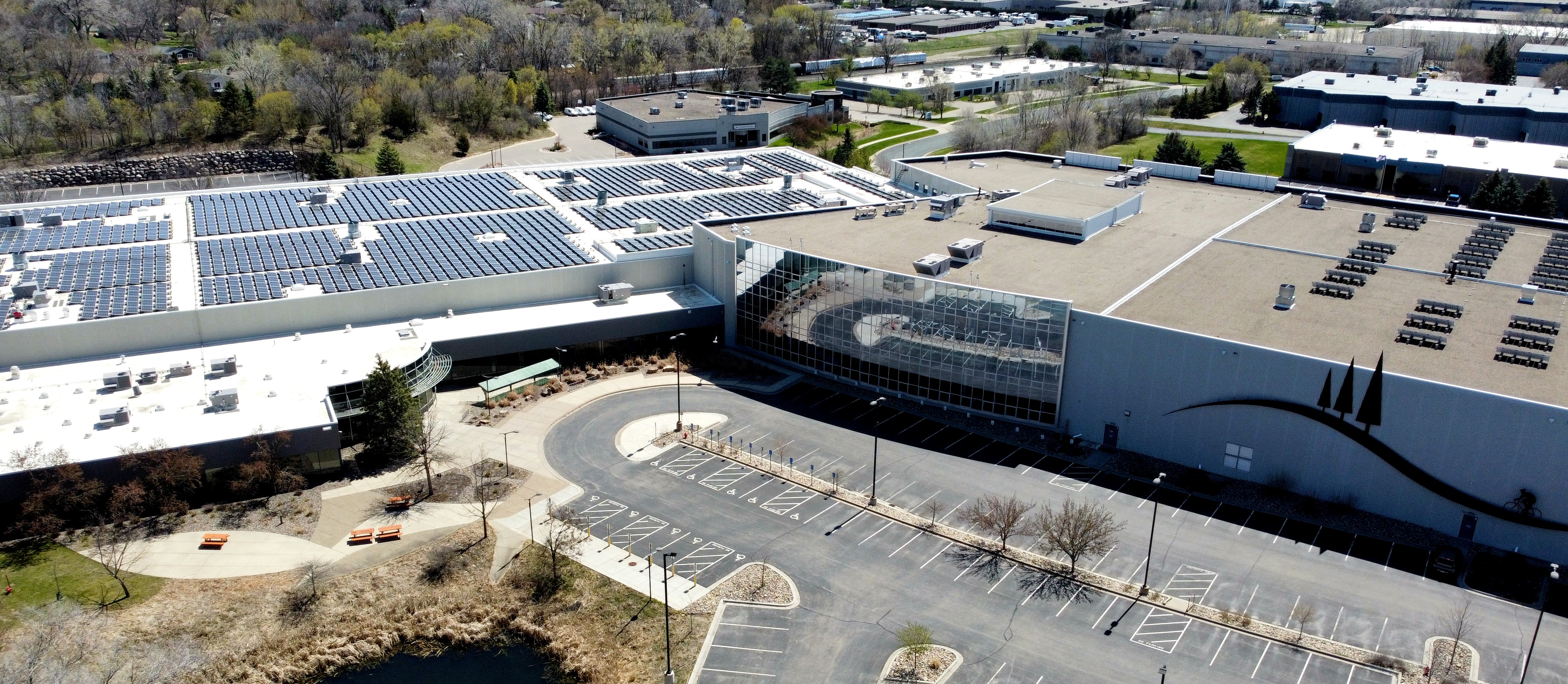
- Company type: Private
- Industry: Bicycle parts and accessories distribution
- Founded: 1981; 45 years ago
- Headquarters: Bloomington, MN, United States
- Key people: Steve Flagg, founder
- Revenue: ▲$200 million USD (2014)
- Number of employees: 690 (2015)
- Website: www.qbp.com

Quality Bicycle Products (QBP) is a large distributor of bicycle parts and accessories in the bicycle industry, based in the United States, with revenues of $150 million in 2008. In addition to wholesaling bicycles and components from other manufacturers, QBP owns and manufactures several brands of its own, including Salsa Cycles and Surly Bikes.

== History ==
Founded by Steve Flagg and Mary Henrickson in 1981, QBP operated from a small office in St. Paul, MN. The company did $100,000 in sales during its first year. In the second year sales reached $250,000 and in 1983 the company received half a million dollars in sales. Early on, the company's main product was its mountain bikes, and QBP also specialised in importing hard-to-find mountain-bike parts from suppliers in Japan. In 1984, QBP hired its first employee and sold $1 million in parts. In 1996 QBP purchased a 67,000-square-foot (6,200 m^{2}) warehouse on its current site in West Bloomington.

QBP purchased Salsa Cycles in 1997, a California-based mountain-bike manufacturer. The following year, the firm entered the emerging single-speed bike market with its in-house designed Singleton chain tensioner. Later in 1998, this product and the new Rat Ride single-speed frame (soon renamed the 1X1) helped launch the company’s new start-up, Surly Bikes. The company continued developing brands for under-served markets, adding specialty parts with Problem Solvers, value parts and accessories with Dimension, and high-end components with Winwood. It also became the exclusive U.S. distributor for Jagwire, a Taiwan-based manufacturer of bicycle brake and derailleur components, including pads, cables and, cable housing.

Responding to the growing trend of bike commuting and “transportation-oriented” cycling, the firm created the Civia bike brand in 2007. The following year, the firm transformed Wheelhouse, its dealer-oriented wheel-building service, into Handspun, a consumer-oriented manufacturer of hand-trued and custom-built wheels. It also founded All-City, which offers single-speed and fixed-gear bikes, parts and accessories for urban bicycling. In 2007 QBP received the first annual Carbon Buster Award from U.S. Senator Amy Klobuchar. The firm opened a second distribution center in Ogden, Utah in the spring of 2010, that has been awarded LEED Gold certification by the U.S. Green Building Council, the firm was named one of America's Top Work Places by Outside Magazine in 2011. Later that year the firm opened a third distribution center in Middletown, PA, and moved to a new facility in Lancaster, PA in January 2015.

In 2015 Flagg retired from his position as CEO and was replaced with Rich Tauer, previously vice-president of marketing and sales. Flagg continued on as the company's chairman. That year the company opened offices in Taiwan, bringing the company to 690 employees. In 2016 the company opened a fourth facility in Reno, Nevada.

In April 2020, the company announced layoffs for 12 percent of its workforce due to the COVID-19 pandemic.

== Brands ==
The company owns nineteen brands including Salsa, Surly, All-City, 45North, Handspun, Foundry, Civia, Whisky, MSW, Problem Solvers, Dimension, Mechanical Threads, R12, Q-Tubes, Buzzy's and iSSi. Through its Q-Active division, the company distributes products to independent skiing, running, and outdoor retailers. QBP entered a distribution agreement with Fyxation in 2011. The company distributes both bicycles themselves and bicycle parts, in addition to outdoor gear. In August 2023 it was announced that the brand All-City would be discontinued after the 2024 season.
