= Lincoln Village, Milwaukee =

Neighborhood in Milwaukee, Wisconsin, United States of America

Coordinates: 43°00′05″N 87°55′37″W

Lincoln Village is a south side neighborhood within the City of Milwaukee.

== Geography ==
Lincoln Village blocks

Using current street names, the Lincoln Village neighborhood is bounded by W Becher Street on the north to the Kinnickinnic River on the south, by South 5th Street on the east to South 20th Street on the west.

== Demographics ==
Lincoln Village is home to over 16,000 residents. This population is approximately 55% Latino, 30% European American, 10% African American, and 5% of other ethnicities. The median household income as of 2007 was $28,145. As of 2007, homeownership was attained by 54% of Lincoln Village households.

== History ==
The neighborhood was founded by Milwaukee's Polish community in the late 19th century. The growing number of Polish immigrants coming to Milwaukee in the late 19th and early 20th centuries created a great demand for new home construction. In 1880, there were approximately 30,000 Polish living in Milwaukee, making it the second largest ethnic population in the city. According to the 2000 US census, there were 57,485 Polish residents of Milwaukee, making it the third largest Polish population in the United States.

Some of the original Polish population of Lincoln Village has remained and mixed with the continuing waves of new immigrant populations to arrive in Milwaukee. Lincoln Village is one of the most culturally, ethnically, and economically diverse communities in Wisconsin. The newest residents of Lincoln Village have immigrated predominately from the Jalisco and Michoacán States of Mexico., with other, less predominant groups immigrating from Central and South America. The cultural similarities and also cultural diversity of Lincoln Village have contributed greatly to the stability of the neighborhood.

The neighborhood's main commercial street, West Lincoln Avenue, is the home of two historic landmarks - the Basilica of St. Josaphat and Forest Home Cemetery which were added to the National Register of Historic Places in 1973 and 1980, respectively. The commercial district is the only designated Wisconsin Main Street in Milwaukee, and is also a member of the local Main Street Milwaukee program.

These programs, operated by the Lincoln Village Business Association, serve to fill commercial vacancies in Lincoln Village as well as promote historic preservation and to maintain the aesthetic quality of the neighborhood.

Today, the main street in Lincoln Village is full of specialty Mexican and Polish shops, one of the oldest florist businesses in Milwaukee, the largest bicycle shop in Milwaukee and the independent Milwaukee Bicycle Company brand, a recording studio, and dining establishments with cuisine from Serbia, El Salvador, and Mexico.

== Architecture ==
W. Lincoln Ave at S. 12th St

Much of the neighborhood's housing and commercial building stock have been preserved in their original condition. Because of this, Lincoln Village is the densest neighborhood in the State of Wisconsin and the streets have a strong European feel. The predominant residential building type in the neighborhood is the Polish flat, an early 20th-century form of housing that resembled a small cape-style home raised 1/2 story to incorporate a new living space on the ground floor. The relatively small size of the Polish flat and the small parcel sizes of the time resulted in a high density of building construction within the neighborhoods.

Along the neighborhood's main street, West Lincoln Avenue, the predominant building type is mixed-use with a strong emphasis of Polish gables and attention to fine architectural detail.

=== Basilica of St. Josaphat ===
The dome of the Basilica of St. Josaphat.

The magnificent dome of St. Josaphat Basilica rises as a crown jewel of Milwaukee's south side. The parish was formed by Father Wilhelm Grutza in 1888 and named after Josaphat Kuntsevych, an Eastern European bishop and martyr. As Polish immigrants continued to arrive on the south side of Milwaukee, the need for a larger church grew. Architect Erhard Brielmaier was consulted and in 1896 plans were completed for the basilica design that Lincoln Village has today. When Father Grutza traveled to Chicago to buy brick for these plans, he learned that the Chicago Federal Building (Post Office and Customs House) was to be razed. Seizing the opportunity, he purchased the entire building, including stones, hardware, and six granite Corinthian columns for re-use at his church.

St. Josaphat's is modeled after St. Peter's Basilica in Rome. It is Neo-Renaissance in style, with a cross-shaped floor plan. The basilica is 212 feet by 128 feet. Two 100 foot towers frame a columned portico on the north. The massive copper-sheathed dome rises 250 feet from the ground level.

The interior of the basilica is extensively decorated with murals, paintings, and gilded plaster work. The stained glass windows, imported from Innsbruck, Austria portray Polish as well as traditional Biblical themes. There are five altars of marble and onyx, an ornate hand-carved marble pulpit, and marble stations of the cross.

St. Josaphat's was elevated to the status of minor basilica in 1929, an honor awarded only to the grandest, most beautiful, and historically significant structures. St. Josaphat's continues to be a parish church with a largely Polish congregation.

=== Grutza Building ===
The Grutza Block

This outstanding commercial building is situated on land once belonging to the Coleman family's Hazelwood Estate at 610 W. Lincoln Ave. Father Wilhelm Grutza, pastor of St. Josaphat's, purchased a parcel from Ellen Coleman in 1899, directly across the street from the basilica, then in its final stages of construction. Like the basilica, this building was designed by Erhard Brielmaier and it is said that the commercial building utilized leftover materials from the basilica's construction. The large pediment and prominent bays were designed in a robust Baroque fashion to complement the basilica across the street. The earliest known tenants in the commercial building were Jos. Rechlicz, a retail clothier who occupied the east storefront from 1902 to 1903, and Steve Rozga, who operated a furniture store and undertaking establishment in the west storefront between 1901 and 1907.

=== Riviera Theater ===
The former Riviera Theater is now a storage facility for the Milwaukee Bicycle Co.

The permit to build the Riviera Theater (1005 W. Lincoln Ave) was taken out in May 1919. The newspaper announced its construction cost as $125,000. The architect was Lesser and Schutte. The theater had its first showing on January 28, 1920, and showed Polish language kiddie matinees.

The Riviera was a good example of a "transitional" theater as days of the "photoplay parlor" were ending and the movie palace had yet to fully arrive. Further foreshadowing the movie palace, the Riviera featured the organist Casimir Uszler who played an organ valued at $12,000. At one point, there was also a ten-piece orchestra led by Frank Ullenberg. The Riviera contained a fully rigged stage with two dressing rooms. These features were evidence of the neighborhood vaudeville and dramatic performances envisioned by the management.

Rather than follow the pattern of photoplay parlors and by having an elaborate facade to attract customers to a plain interior, the Riviera had a relatively plain facade and an elaborate interior. The seating capacity was 1,200. In the Riviera, a rare form of construction unique to Milwaukee was used: the "stadium style" balcony where one could walk from the main floor seats directly up to the balcony.

== Kosciuszko Park ==
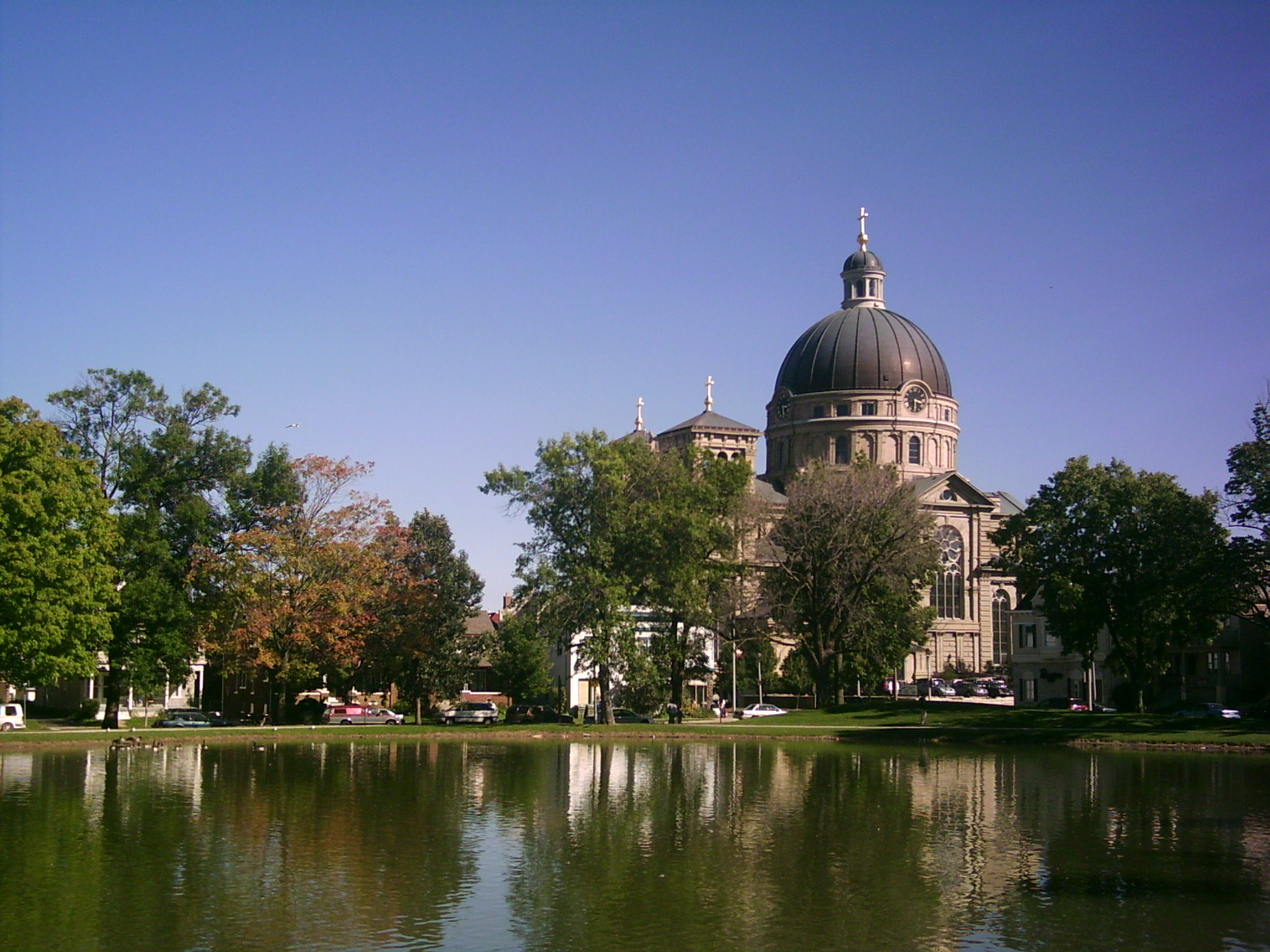
Kosciuszko Park with the lagoon and basilica

One of the south side of Milwaukee's largest 33.6-acre (136,000 m^{2})public parks, Kosciuszko Park, is located in the Lincoln Village neighborhood. Originally known as Lincoln Avenue Park and locally known as "Kosy," the park is a gathering place that has been vital to the health of the neighborhood for over a century. As the densest populated neighborhood in Wisconsin, the park serves a variety of recreational activities for Milwaukee's urban residents - soccer, youth football, fishing, the Pelican Cove water park, and the Kosy Community Center which offers boxing, basketball, and community events.

Kosy Park once was the home of the Kosciuszko Reds, a franchise of the Polish-American Semiprofessional Baseball League. The Reds played until 1919 and routinely drew crowds into the thousands.

=== Kosciuszko Monument ===
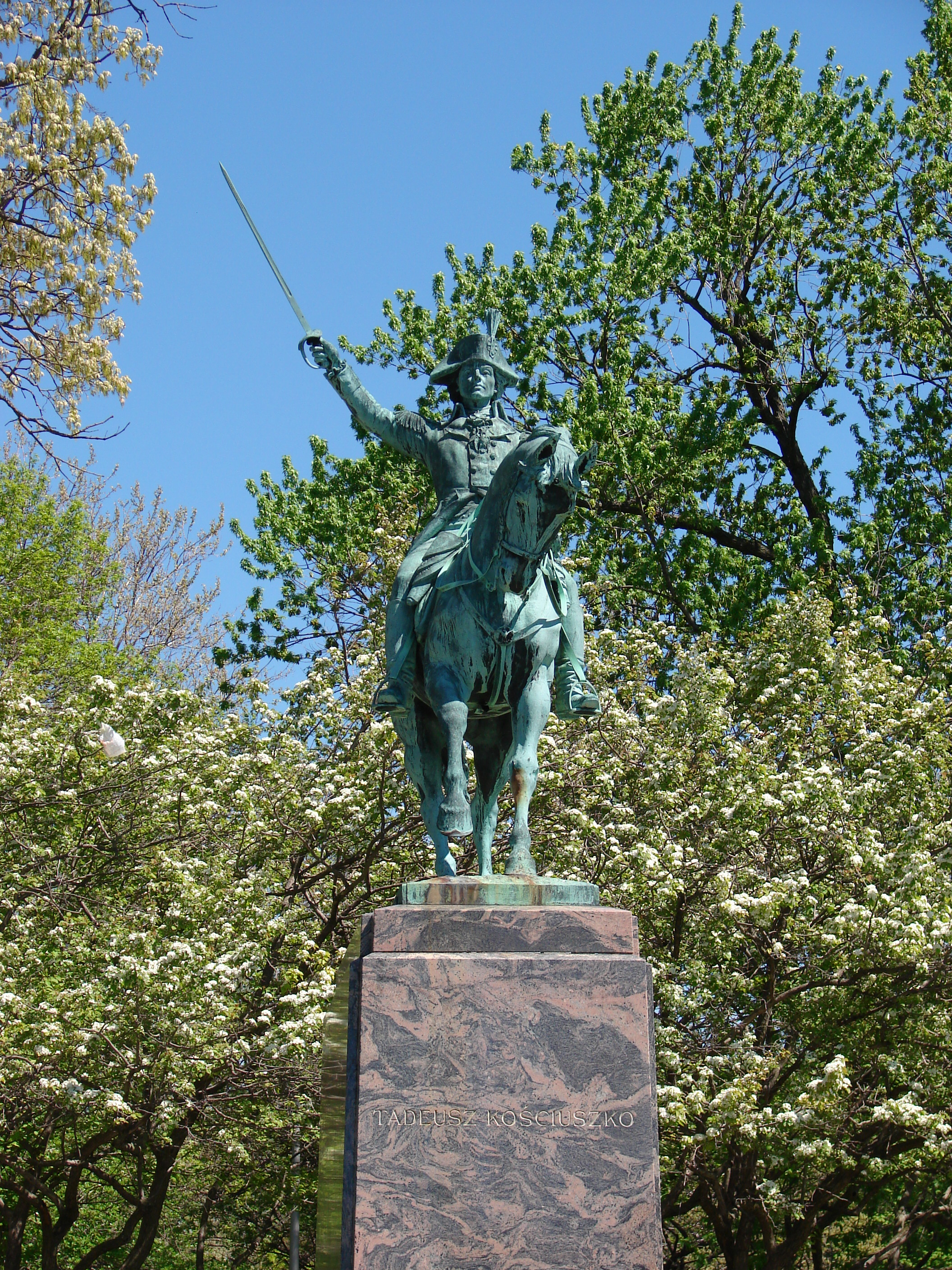
The Kosciuszko Monument on W. Lincoln Ave.

At the intersection of South 9th Place and West Lincoln Ave. is one of Milwaukee's oldest sculptures. In honor of Polish-American hero General Tadeusz Kościuszko, the Lincoln Village Polish community commissioned the bronze monument's construction in 1904. Designed and constructed by Italian sculptor Gaetano Trentanove, the monument was completed in 1905. It was then moved to its current site and re-mounted on a marble pedestal in 1950.

Funds for the monument's construction were collected as personal donations from Lincoln Village residents. These donations were as little as 5 cents, but the Polish community was able to raise over $13,000 which is equivalent to $344,000 in 2009 dollars. Further impressive of this community's fund raising campaign is that it occurred immediately after a similar fund raising campaign for the construction of the Basilica of St. Josaphat in 1901.

Before World War II, a pair of Dahlgren coastal defense cannon sat on garrison carriages on either side of the monument. They are no longer there and their whereabouts are unknown.

Also in 1950, the City of Milwaukee filled the structure with concrete in an effort to fortify the monument. Over time, this concrete has expanded and damaged the monument from the inside. Further surface damage has occurred over time due to harsh Wisconsin winters. Local community groups are working together to raise funds to repair the monument in the same manner that the local Polish community took to raise funds to construct the monument.

== Gallery ==
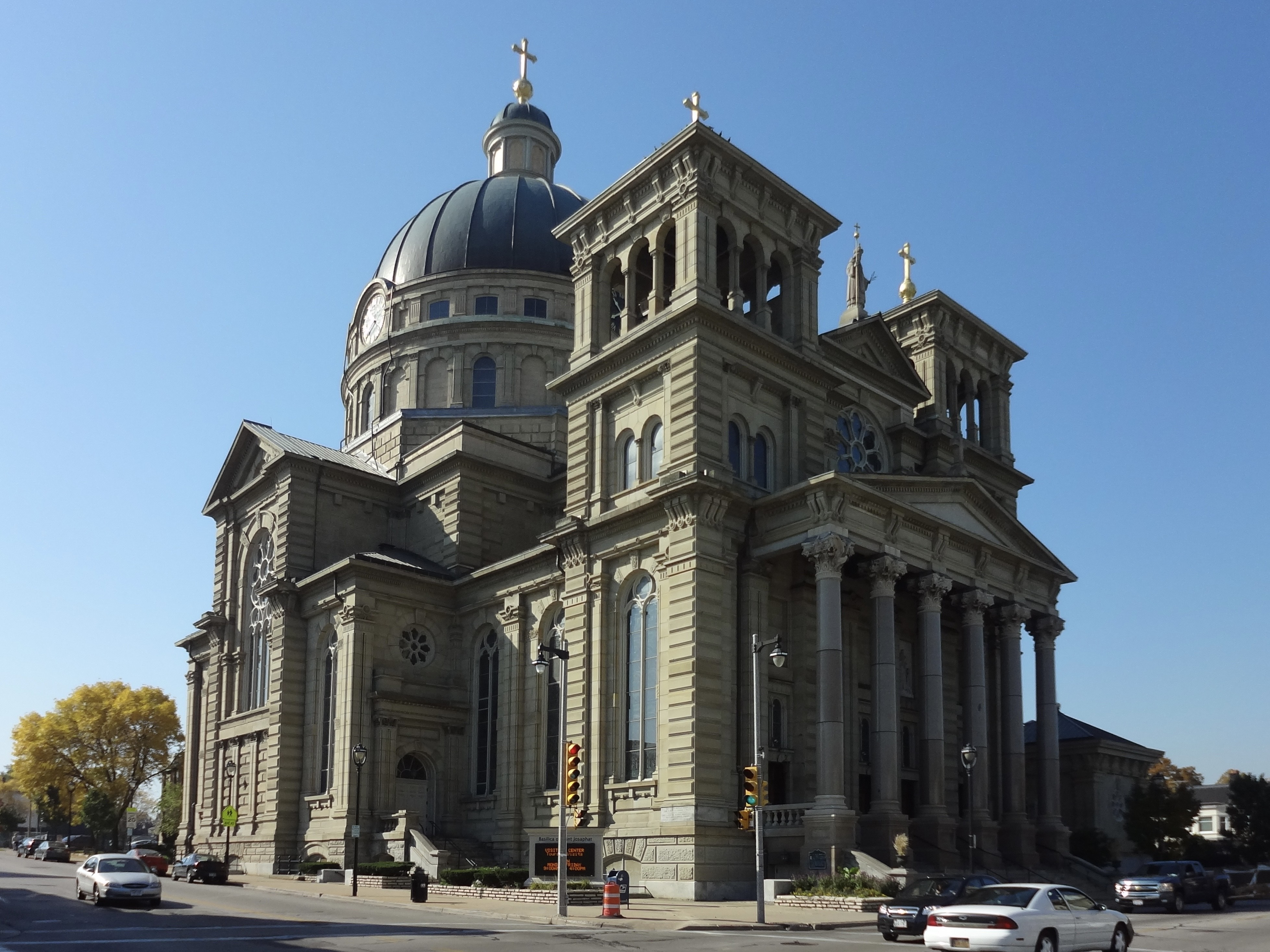
Basilica of St. Josaphat, on Lincoln and 5th St.

The Basilica of Saint Josaphat.

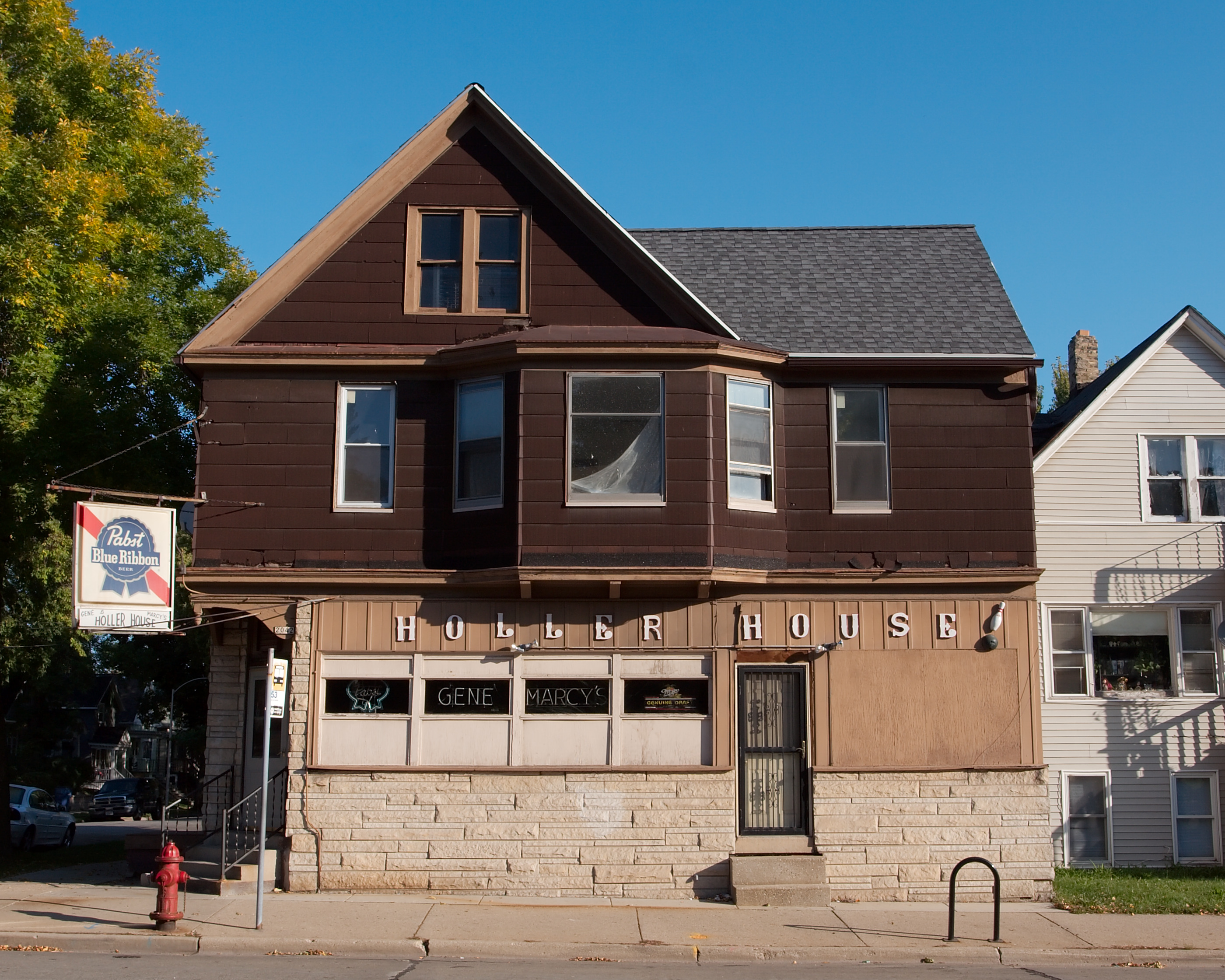
Holler House, on Lincoln and 20th St.

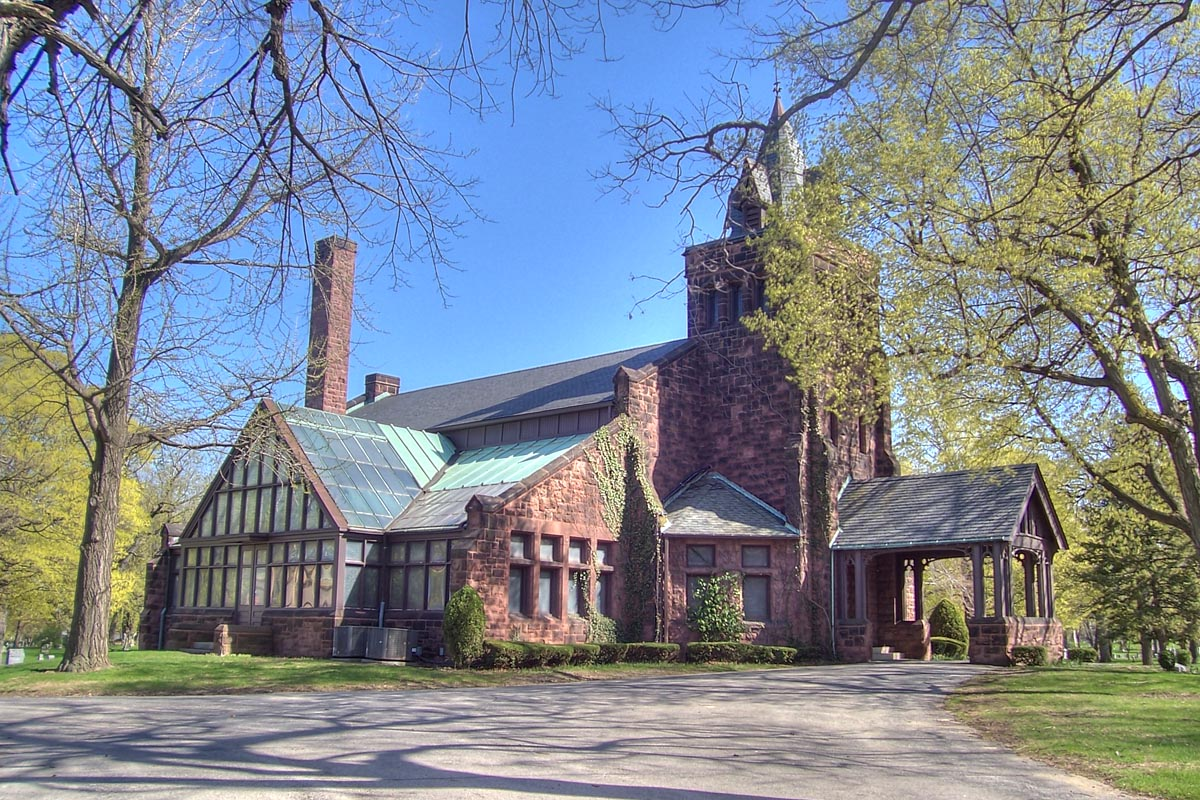
Landmark Chapel in Forest Home Cemetery on Lincoln and 24th St.

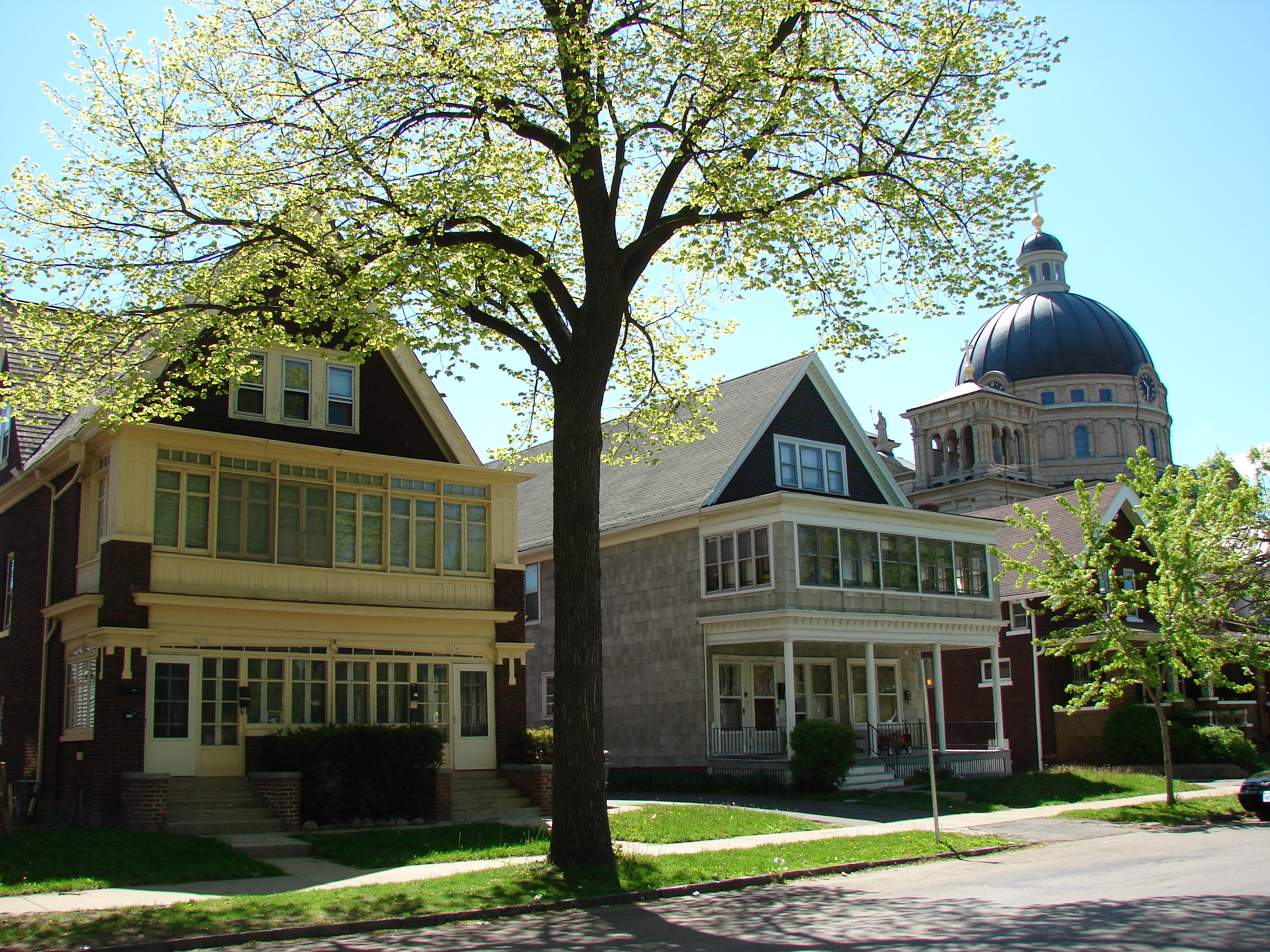
Lincoln Village homes.

Lincoln Village street scape in spring.

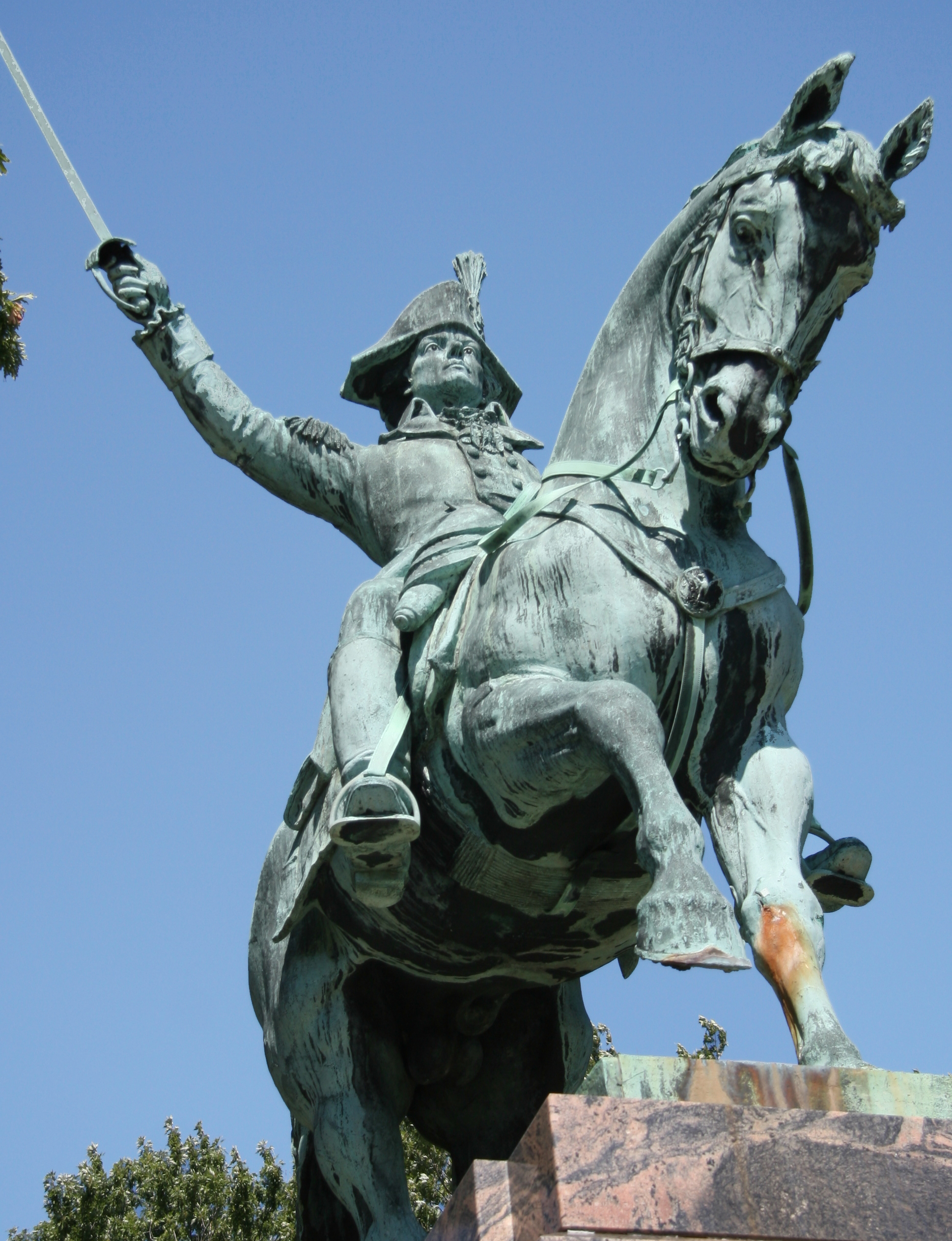
The Kosciuszko Monument

== See also ==
- Quartet
