= Surly Bikes =

American bicycle manufacturing company

- Type: Private
- Industry: Bicycles
- Founded: 1998
- Headquarters: Bloomington, Minnesota, United States
- Products: Bicycles and bicycle parts
- Parent: Quality Bicycle Products
- Website: www.surlybikes.com

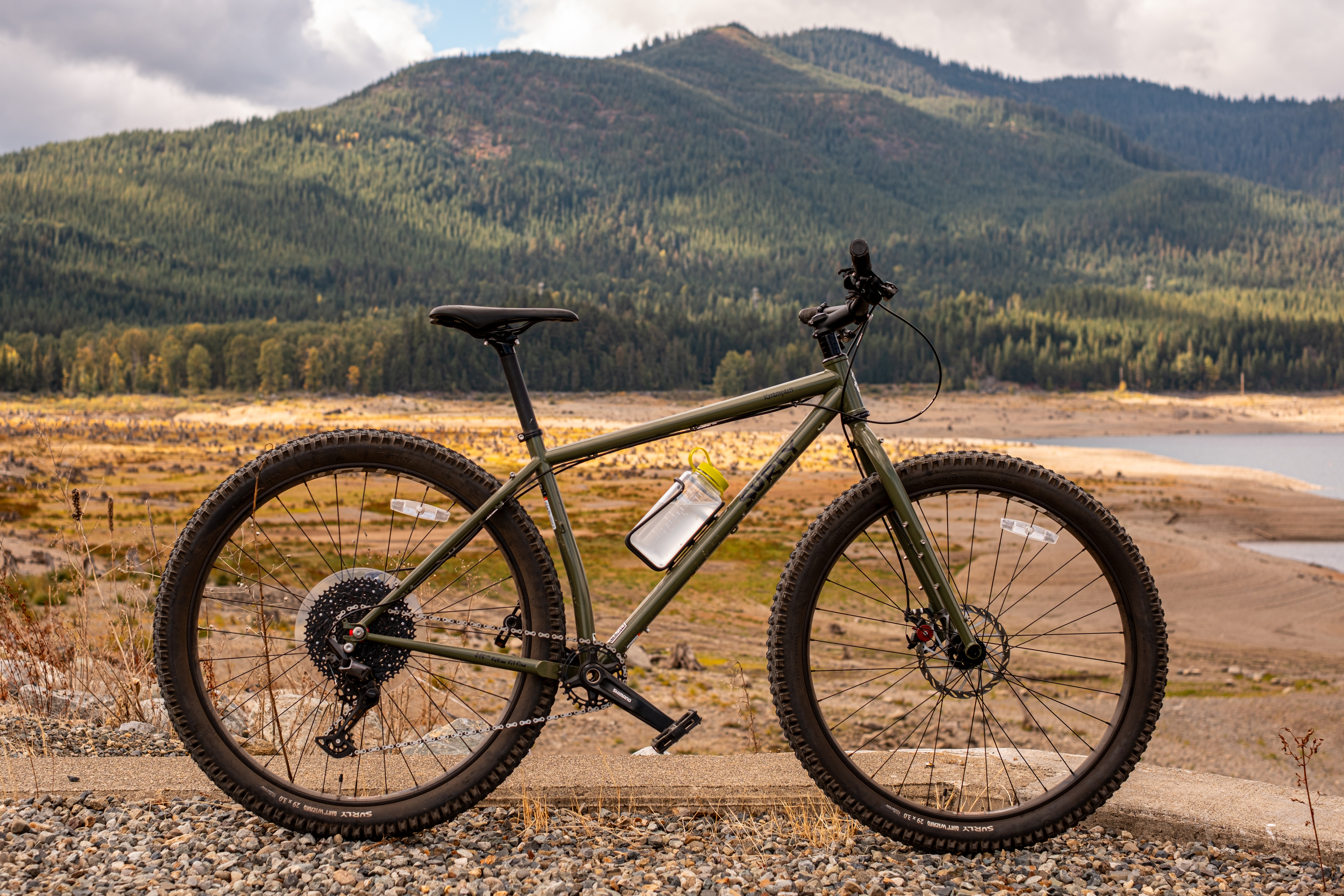
A Surly Krampus 29+ mountain bike with 3-inch-wide tires

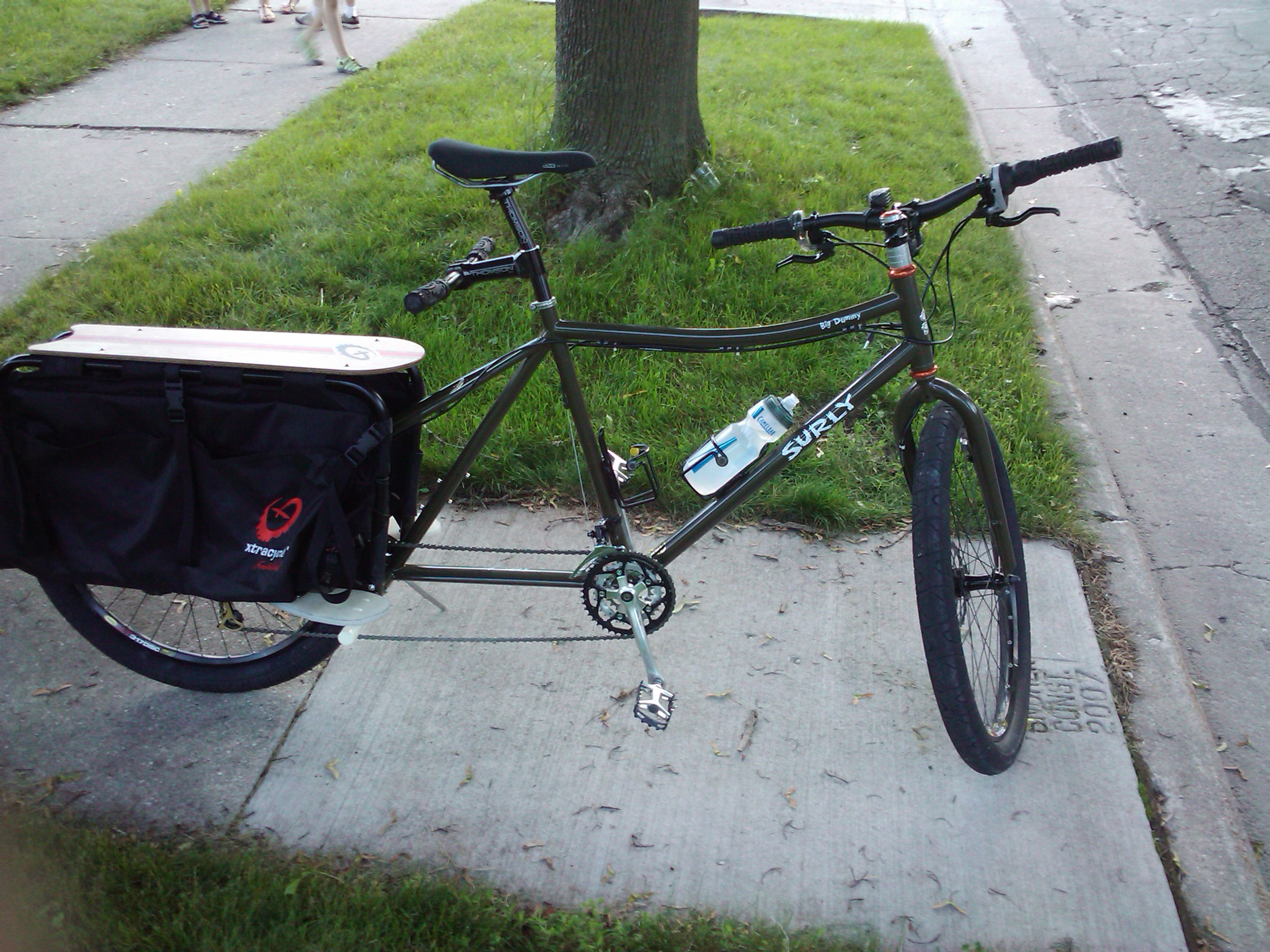
A Big Dummy, a model of bicycle manufactured by Surly, in 2010

Surly Bikes, or Surly, is a bicycle brand based in Bloomington, Minnesota, United States, that was founded in 1998. It is a division of Quality Bicycle Products, a manufacturer and distributor of bicycles and bicycle parts.

Despite sharing a similar name and both being headquartered in Minnesota, Surly Bikes and Surly Brewing Company are separate enterprises, with an agreement between the two companies allowing the bicycle company to display the single word "Surly" on its products. Surly Brewing’s Omar Ansari reached out to Surly Bikes before launching the brewery to make sure there would be no conflict.

== History ==
The Surly brand was developed in-house at the Minnesota-based Quality Bicycle Products in the 1990s as a complement to its other brands, such as Salsa Cycles. At the time, "fatbikes" were emerging on the market for winter use in snowy climates, but they were considered exotic and too expensive to produce. Quality Bicycle Products hoped to standardize parts to make mass production easier. Soon after its founding in the late 1990s, the Surly brand was mostly known in the bicycle industry for its single-speed bikes, but in the 2010s it became known for Fatbike|fat-tire bikes that it helped pioneer with machinery it owned. By the 2010s, many brands that manufactured fat bikes used Surly tires.

In April 2020, Surly's parent company announced layoffs for 12 percent of its workforce due to the COVID-19 pandemic.

== Products ==
Surly’s first bike was the Rat Ride, later renamed the 1x1. Soon thereafter, Surly started offering bike parts. Next they offered a road bike (Cross-Check), a trail bike (Karate Monkey) and a mountain bike (Krampus).

Surly's Pugsley fat bike that debuted in 2005 was praised by reviewers for its common hub feature that allowed for interchanges, additional gearing combinations, and ability to handle a variety of conditions.

In 2019, Surly faced a product recall of 5,000 bike racks due to crash hazards.

Surly discontinued the Cross-Check in 2023 after 24 years.
