= Salsa Cycles =

American bicycle company

- Company type: Private
- Industry: Bicycles
- Headquarters: Bloomington, Minnesota, USA
- Website: salsacycles.com

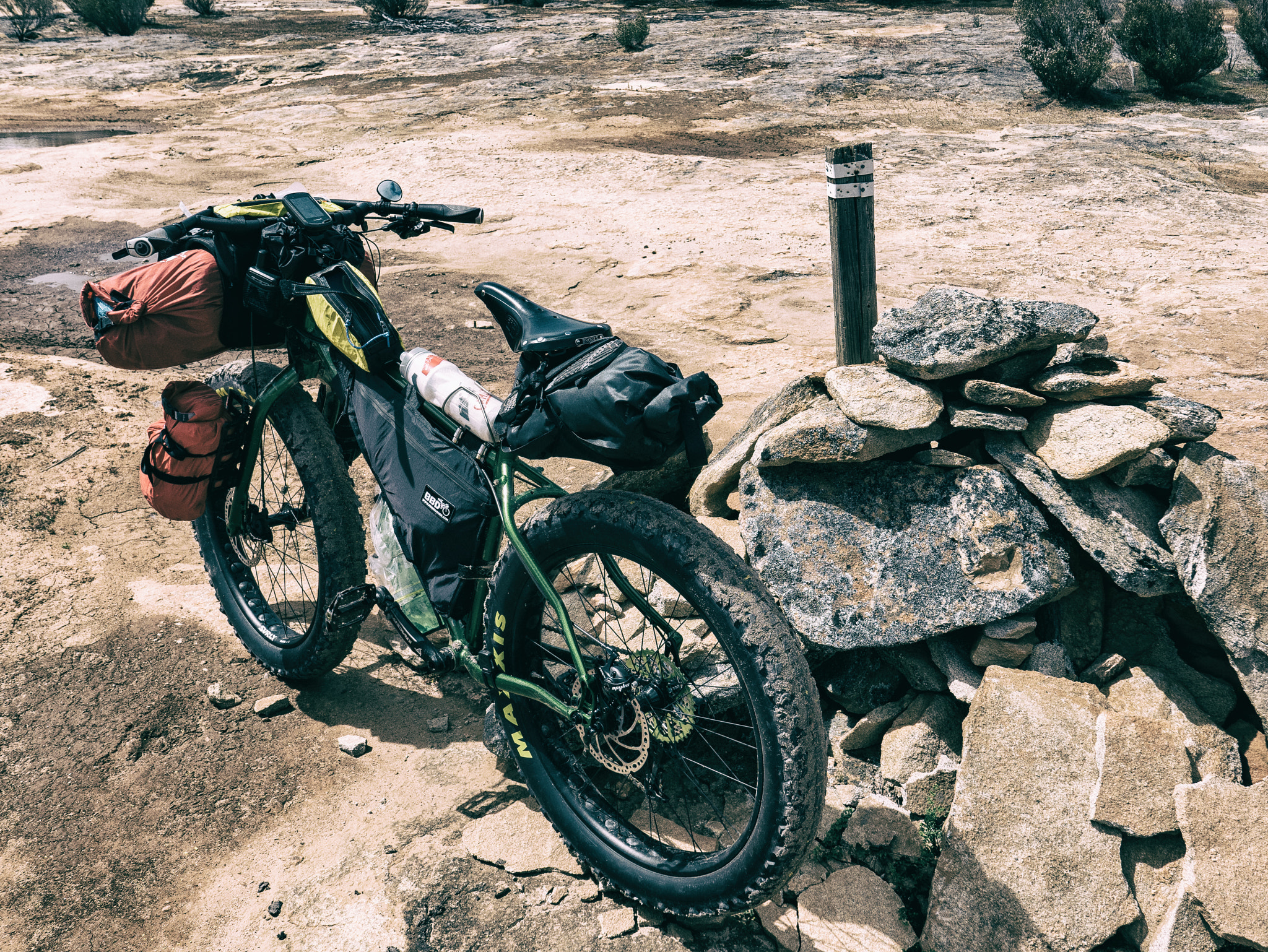
A Salsa Mukluk fatbike.

Salsa Cycles is an American bicycle brand based in Bloomington, Minnesota. The company produces touring, mountain, road, and gravel bicycles, as well as bicycle components. The Salsa Cycles brand, along with its sister brands Surly Bikes and All-City Cycles, is owned by the Bloomington-based Quality Bicycle Products. The Salsa brand is widely recognized by winter biking enthusiasts in cold climates.

== History ==
Ross Shafer founded Salsa Cycles in the early 1980s. The company initially focused on producing bicycle frames and custom stems. In 1997, the brand was acquired by Minnesota-based Quality Bicycle Products, which transitioned from a wholesale bike-parts distributor to a bike-brand conglomerate, with a focus on biking in climates with cold winters. In 2021, Quality Bicycle Products employed over 600 people.

== Products ==
Salsa has bike frames made in Asia out of aluminum, carbon fiber, titanium, and chromoly steel. They have several bike touring bicycles, fat tire bikes, bikepacking bikes, and gravel bikes, as well as full-suspension mountain bikes. Some Salsa frames are equipped with a unique dropout design that Salsa has manufactured in Asia. The "alternator dropout" allows for a bike to be easily converted from a rear derailleur to a single speed, permits the use of several different hub standards, and allows for an adjustable wheelbase.
