= Milwaukee Bicycle Co. =

Bicycle company in Milwaukee, Wisconsin

Milwaukee Bike Company Logo

Milwaukee Bicycle Co. head badge.

The Milwaukee Bicycle Co. is brand of bicycle and bicycle parts. It is the house brand of Ben's Cycle and Fitness, a family-owned bicycle shop in the Lincoln Village neighborhood of Milwaukee, Wisconsin.

Milwaukee Bicycle Co. frames are manufactured by Waterford Precision Cycles, owned by Richard Schwinn (whose family founded the Schwinn Bicycle Company).

== See also ==
- Fyxation
- Lincoln Village, City of Milwaukee, Wisconsin
