= Claud Butler =

British bicycle dealer (1903–1978)

Claud Butler (14 July 1903 – 2 November 1978) was a London-based bicycle dealer and frame-builder, who from 1928 created a chain of bicycle-retail shops in London and the Midlands. His company was one of the most successful of the inter-war era but failed after World War II and the resultant boom in motor buses and motor cars. The Claud Butler brand was bought from the receivers by other companies, and they are now produced by Falcon Cycles, a division of Tandem Group.

== Early years ==
Claud Butler was the son of a worker in the silk industry who thought his son would follow him into the trade. Instead he developed an interest in cycling after delivering bottles of medicine for a doctor in south London. He joined Balham cycling club, worked for the Halford Cycle Company as a mechanic and then as a salesman, and then on 28 February 1928 opened a bicycle shop at 8 Lavender Road, Clapham Junction. He worried about giving it his own name, which he thought effeminate. He began building bicycle frames and within four years opened branches across London. The first was at Lewisham, followed by 101 East Hill, Wandsworth (SW London), 34 and 34a Lee High Rd, Lewisham (SE London), 71 Grand Parade, Harringay (N London), 241 High Street North, East Ham (E London), and 18 Greyfriar Gate, Nottingham.

He moved his office to Clapham Manor Street in 1932. The branches in East Ham and Nottingham closed during the Second World War.

The weekly magazine, The Bicycle, said:

Ideas, practical innovations, use of the latest machinery brought "C.B." bicycles well to the fore in the lightweight industry. Claud Butler accomplished many fine technical achievements, and pioneered many of the present-day developments. Among those with the C.B. hallmark are the origination of the upright bicycle, which dispensed with the old 69 degrees parallel frames; the development of the short wheel-base tandem in 1935; and the introduction of three speeds on tricycles.

Claud Butler cycles were known for features such as bronze-weld construction and decorative lugs (techniques pioneered by continental frame builders). He sponsored international racers such as Reg Harris, Eileen Sheridan, Peter Underwood and Dennis Sutton Horn. His bikes were ridden at the 1931 world championship in Copenhagen and then in Italy (1932), France (1933) and Germany (1934). Claud Butler bikes also competed at the Los Angeles Olympics in 1932.

He celebrated the popularity of his bicycles with bands and entertainment held at the Manor Street works.

He was a founder of the Lightweight Manufacturers' Association and for a period its secretary.

== Personality ==
David Palk said: "Claud Butler was a showman-entrepreneur who had grasped every available opportunity to promote and develop a successful business. For instance, how many other quality lightweight manufacturers promoted an annual 'do' with a dance band and cabaret acts, or produced a pin badge, or were active sponsors of well known international riders, or placed regular display advertising in Cycling, or used their proprietor's personality in the form of a cartoon caricature, or marked their jubilee with special models, or claimed to be both "The King of Lightweights" and "Just one of the boys"? Nobody else in the trade was able to equal the zest or flamboyance of Claud Butler."

== Death ==
Claud Butler tried to return to business several times throughout the 1960s but could not recapture the success of the interwar period. He died at home in London on 2 November 1978 after a long illness.

== Second World War and decline ==
Claud Butler's initial rise was prematurely curtailed with the outset of World War II. The suspension of international cycling events and the curtailment of domestic meetings reduced the demand for his frames, along with other small-scale manufacturers.

The cycling historian David Palk says:

By the mid-fifties the glory days were over, with club cycling beginning to lose favour as a popular activity across Britain. Several manufacturers' records show a sudden dip in production from the early fifties onwards. The phasing-out of war-time rationing, as well as increased affluence throughout the population, brought aspirations towards consumerism and motorized transport. This was at odds with the simple pleasures of club cycling. The ultimate distraction – television – also became more affordable at this time, with many thousands of households equipping themselves to watch the live broadcast of the Queen's Coronation in 1953. In the mid-to-late fifties Britain's lightweight trade was in serious decline, with several prominent marques relocating and downsizing, becoming amalgamated or simply packing up for good. Claud's finances were in a poor state and a large sum owing to the taxman put the final nail in the coffin.

Saudi Arabia's oil embargo against Britain and France during the Suez Crisis brought Claud Butler to closure. With fuel shortages, British industry could operate only a four-day week and, with little demand for cycles let alone lightweight frames, the Clapham Manor Street site began to fall quiet. Finally £150,000 owed to HM Customs and Excise forced Claud Butler to declare bankruptcy. The receiver put debts at £70,000 with assets of £12,000 to £13,000.

== 1957–1987 Holdsworth ownership ==
A number of cycle manufacturers showed interest in purchasing the brand and assets. Two were Adam Hill of Hill and Hill Special, and Holdsworth. Adam Hill had used the economic downturn to his advantage and expanded his business by acquiring the Merlin name from Ernie Merlin. In late 1956 he travelled to London and bought the rights to the Claud Butler and to the Saxon name, which Butler also owned. However, his venture to buy Claud Butler added to the financial pressures on his own business which then foundered, and ended with a meeting with creditors in 1958. This permitted Holdsworth to buy three Claud Butler trade marks ("CB and link design Headbadge", "CB monogram and devise" and the "Claud Butler signature") in July 1958. Claud Butler frames continued to sell well, and in some instances, outsold their Holdsworth counterparts.

== Falcon 1987 to present ==
Elswick Hopper throughout the 1970s acquired brands including Wearwell (1974) and Falcon (1978). In 1982 the agglomerated firm was restructured and renamed Elswick-Falcon Cycles. It bought the Holdsworth and Claud Butler names in February 1987. These acquisitions brought with them a change to volume production with the Claud Butler and Holdsworth brands reserved for the premium frames in the new range.
