= Holdsworth =

British bicycle manufacturer

- Industry: Bicycle manufacture and accessories
- Predecessor: Ashlone Cycle Works
- Founded: 1926
- Founder: William Frank "Sandy" Holdsworth
- Headquarters: London, England
- Area served: United Kingdom
- Owner: Planet X Limited
- Website: holdsworth-bikes.com

Holdsworth was a bicycle manufacturer in London, England. It was created by William Frank Holdsworth, known as "Sandy", and the brand is now owned by Planet X Limited based in Rotherham, Yorkshire.

== History ==
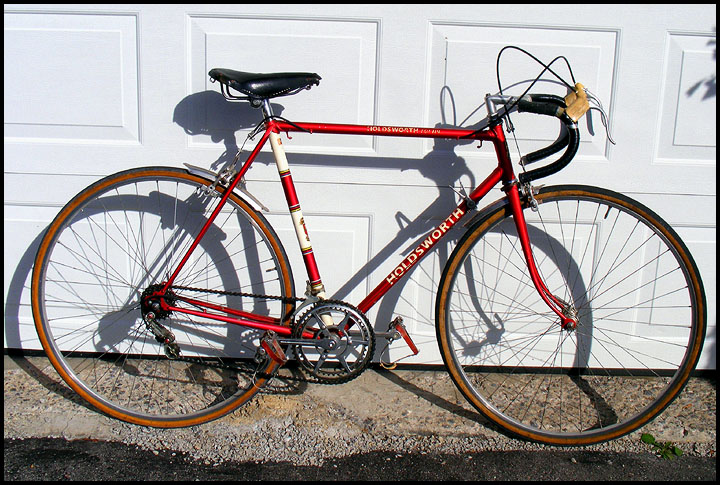
A Holdsworth bicycle made in the early 1970s

Sandy Holdsworth was born in the London borough of Lambeth in 1891. Holdsworth was a keen cyclist and a member of Cyclist Touring Club (CTC). In 1924, he became a founding member of the South Eastern Road Club, the racing offshoot of the SE section of the CTC. In 1927, he took over Ashlone Cycle Works at 132 Lower Richmond Road, Putney, southwest London. Holdsworth continued to work during the day in his life insurance business, and appointed his wife's brother, Owen Bryars, as manager.

The shop mechanic, Jack Capeling, made the first Holdsworth frames there around the end of the 1920s, using a shed behind the building. The company expanded by the end of 1930, it had further premises at 121 Lennard Rd, Beckenham, Kent; 185 Markhouse Road, Walthamstow; and 5 Thesiger Road, Penge.

Holdsworth's wife, Margaret, came from a family in the clothing business. The clothing background appears relevant because Holdsworth began advertising cycling garments and shoes under the brand name Worthy. The company was better regarded for clothes than for frames until the arrival in 1938 of an established frame-builder, Bill Hurlow.

Hurlow arrived at the time of an internal dispute, which led the manager, Owen Bryars, to open a rival shop across the road, and another in Beckenham, south London.

The original company formed a subsidiary, Holdsworthy Factoring, which built W.F. Holdsworth bicycles and wholesaled British-made parts and those it began importing from the continent.

=== Mass market ===
Holdsworth bought the business and brands of Freddie Grubb in 1952 from the Grubb family who were still running the cycle business of Freddie Grubb after his demise. After the business of Claud Butler had gone bankrupt, Holdsworth also bought the rights to this brand in 1958. In 1963 the company bought the Macleans brand.

By the time Sandy Holdsworth died on 28 August 1961, the company had grown too large to build the individual frames that racing cyclists were demanding. The division of operation was made clearer when Owen Bryars died in 1958, with the company acquiring his shops which had sold mass-produced Holdsworth bikes, whilst the individual orders were handled by frame-builder Reg Collard at 132 Lower Richmond Road & the Holdsworth own custom builders of 753 P(Fran)Bingham-Crosby in 1978 to 1980's at the (Shed) workshop Crampton Rd.

=== Marketing ===
Holdsworth became a national name in British cycling through both its catalogue, "Aids to Happy Cycling", later renamed "Bike Rider's Aids", and through its professional team.

In 1953 Holdsworth had appointed a former sailor, Roy Thame, who had worked at a cycle shop in Hemel Hempstead, Hertfordshire, where he lived. Working for the company for more than 50 years, Thame established and managed the dominant professional cycling team that the company co-sponsored with Campagnolo accessories of Italy, a brand that Holdsworth had the rights to distribute in the UK. The team's riders included Colin Lewis, who twice rode in the Tour de France, Tour of Britain winner Les West and British National Champion Gary Crewe.

Thame also managed the Great Britain teams in world championships, served on British Cycling Federation committees nationally and acted as commissaire, or chief referee, on domestic multi-day races such as the Tour of the West.

=== Reynolds tubing ===
531-753 Master builders

Reg Collard, Roberts(family), Bill Hurlow, Philip Frances Bingham/Crosby 1978-81

=== Present ===
After the death of Mrs Margaret Holdsworth in the 1970s, the company was split in two.

The wholesale and mass-production side of the business called the Holdsworth Company, which owned the rights to all of the brands, stayed in the Holdsworth family. A change in cycling tastes from road to mountain bikes, general foreign competition through cheap imports from Asia and a sequence of management difficulties led to it being sold to rival bicycle manufacturer Elswick Hopper plc in the mid-1980s. The residual brands of this side of the company are today part of the Falcon Cycles division of Tandem Group plc. A new Holdsworth Professional road bike was announced in January 2011, using the famous orange and blue colour scheme.

Roy Thame inherited two-thirds of the company, effectively inheriting the specialist retail division of the company known as W.F. Holdsworth with a shop at 132 Lower Richmond Road, Putney. After a period selling just low to mid-range mountain and hybrid bikes, it tried to resurrect some of the Holdsworth heritage by selling road bikes, including some top-end frames (e.g. De Rosa) and reintroduced some Holdsworth branded road bikes and clothing. Roy Thame died aged 85 in 2006.

As of December 2013 the shop has closed and is being converted into flats. The Holdsworth Brand was purchased by Planet X Bikes and at L'Eroica Britannia in 2015 a new Heritage range of Holdsworth bikes was launched. developed by Jamie Burrow and Lorenzo Altissimo.

In 2016 Holdsworth worked with master frame builder Mark Reilley and Reynolds to bring the Reynolds 753 tubing back into production creating a rare opportunity to purchase this tube set.

== See also ==
- List of companies based in London
