= Mark W. Publicover =

American entrepreneur and inventor

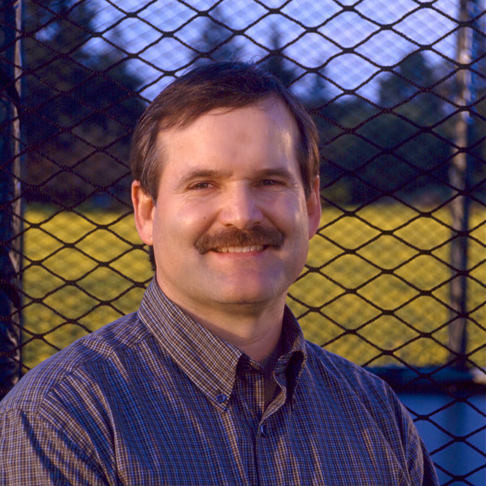
- 1997 portrait of Mark W. Publicover in front of one of his trampoline enclosures
- Born: 1958 (age 67–68); Los Gatos, California
- Education: University of California, Davis
- Occupations: Inventor, entrepreneur
- Known for: Inventor of the first affordable trampoline safety net enclosure
- Title: Founder and CEO of JumpSport, Inc.
- Board member of: JumpSport, Inc.

Mark William Publicover (born 1958 in Los Gatos, California) is an American entrepreneur, inventor and co-founder-owner (with Valerie DePiazza Publicover) of JumpSport, Inc. in Silicon Valley. In 1996, Publicover designed the first trampoline safety net enclosure to become commercially successful. These enclosures protect trampoliners from falling off the trampoline.

== Childhood ==
Publicover is a fourth-generation inventor and entrepreneur born in 1958 in Los Gatos, California. He went to school in San Jose, California, where he graduated from Blackford High School in 1977.

== Education and early career ==
Publicover attended the University of California at Davis where he majored in Economics. He married Valerie A. DePiazza in August 1984. In April 1988, he founded American Builders & Craftsman Inc., a professional homebuilding and commercial construction firm in Saratoga, California.

== Inventor ==
In 1995 Publicover's children, along with friends, were jumping on his trampoline when a young neighbor fell off, hurting herself. After that he began building prototypes of his enclosure design.

Publicover went on to design and patent a trampoline enclosure that is sold as standard equipment with millions of trampolines each year. By July 1997, Publicover's family-run company, JumpSport, had Hedstrom of Bedford, Pennsylvania, manufacturing their trampoline enclosures, but few sales were achieved during the winter holiday season. This was attributed to the enclosure costing slightly more than the trampoline together with the lack of retail distribution. After burning through most of their assets and remortgaging their home, they decided to make one final effort by attending the Sporting Goods Manufacturers Association Super Show in Atlanta and taking out a full-page ad in Disney Magazine. At the Super Show, Costco agreed to test the product in 22 stores, where the product sold well. Costco took the product into all of its stores nationwide. Soon after JumpSport expanded to other retailers.

In 1998 Publicover developed two more trampoline safety inventions. After Publicover suffered a minor leg break while testing another manufacturer's trampoline with his kids, he focused on improving the shock-absorption characteristics of the trampoline bed, patenting the StageBounce and DoubleBounce systems. Between 1998 and 2000 his company introduced four trampolines based on these safety features. In 2000, Publicover raised capital from Silicon Valley's Band of Angels.

As of May 2014, Publicover has been granted 24 patents. He also has more published patent filings, some of which were still being prosecuted.

== Patent litigation ==
Publicover initially sold 200 units to Sam's Club for a market test. The sales led to a verbal order for 6,000 units that fell through. Instead, Sam's Club switched to selling competitor Jump King trampoline enclosures that were later deemed unsafe by the Consumer Product Safety Commission in 2005. Publicover says that more low-quality knock-offs quickly flooded the market. In 2001 Publicover sued Wal-Mart, Hedstrom, Jump King, and several other infringing companies. Publicover ended up winning a seven-figure settlement from Hedstrom and JumpKing and while Wal-Mart was not found liable, they were banned from selling the copycat products. In 2007, JumpSport's 15-employee business had $13 million in sales and in 2008 Publicover claimed over $50 million of lost sales due to patent infringement.

== Legacy ==
From 1998 to 2006, enclosures gained broad acceptance in the marketplace and were being sold together with more than 80% of all trampolines. In that same period, U.S. sales of trampolines doubled from around 550,000 to 1,200,000 while total annual reported trampoline injuries began to decline.

== Personal life ==
As of 2014, Publicover lives in Saratoga, California, with his wife, Valerie DePiazza Publicover. They have one son and two daughters.
