= Elswick Hopper =

UK-based bicycle manufacturer

Elswick Hopper plc
- Type: Public
- Industry: Engineering, Manufacture, Distribution, Packaging, Labelling
- Predecessor: F.Hopper & Co. Ltd
- Founded: 1880
- Founder: Frank Hopper
- Defunct: 1 September 1994
- Fate: Broken from the late 1980s, sold to Ferguson International in 1994
- Successor: Falcon Cycles
- Headquarters: Barton-upon-Humber, North Lincolnshire, England
- Area served: Global
- Key people: Frank Hopper
- Products: Bicycles
- Owner: Tandem Group
- Website: www.elswickbikes.co.uk

Elswick Hopper was a United Kingdom-based manufacturer of bicycles, formed by the merger in 1913 of the Elswick and Hopper cycle companies. The residual bicycle brands are now owned by Tandem Group.

== History ==
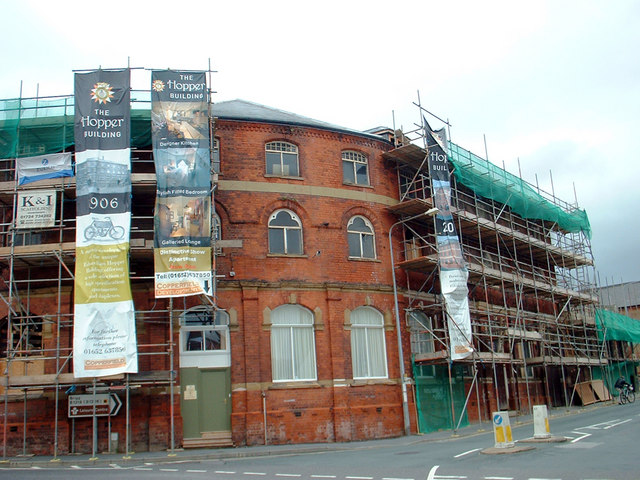
The former head office of Elswick Hopper, at the junction of Brigg Road and Holydyke in Barton-upon-Humber, while being converted into apartments, August 2006

Frederick Hopper was born in 1859, and in 1880 started a bicycle repair business in a former blacksmith's shop in Barton-upon-Humber. He then started manufacturing bicycles, and by 1906 F. Hopper & Co. Ltd was employing 400 people. By 1912 the company was exporting bicycles all over the British Empire, with particularly strong export markets in Australia, India, Japan and South Africa making it a major manufacturing company.

In 1910, Hopper and a series of investors had bought the bankrupt Elswick Cycle Company, which took its name from Elswick, a suburb of Newcastle upon Tyne where it was based. Between 1903 and 1915 it had manufactured motorcycles. Run as two rival companies, in 1913 Hopper bought out his fellow investors and closed the Elswick site, merging the two companies at the Barton-upon-Humber site in 1914 under the title Elswick Hopper Cycle and Motor Company.

The Barton-upon-Humber site began to boom, producing both bicycles and many of their own components, where if he needed more production capacity Fred would simply construct another building. In 1936, after the death of Fred, Elswick Hopper was listed on the London Stock Exchange.

In 1974 Elswick Hopper plc began a period of expansion, purchasing Wearwell Cycles, which had been established before 1872. In 1978 the company acquired Falcon Cycles, which was operated as a subsidiary before being later merged at Barton-upon-Humber.

By the mid-1980s, Elswick Hopper plc was a diversified conglomerate, spanning manufacturing, engineering, and distribution. But the company was losing money at both group and subsidiary level, and was in desperate need of reorganisation. Under a new Chief Executive, the group company renamed itself Elswick plc in 1984, and renamed its bicycle division Falcon Cycles, the name of its most popular selling sports bicycle brand. Ending production of bicycles under the Elswick brand in the same year, all bicycle manufacture was moved to a new factory at Brigg. In 1987, the company bought the manufacturing and wholesale distribution businesses of rival Holdsworth, which included both the Holdsworth and Claud Butler brands.

However, by the late 1980s cheap imports from Asia were flooding the UK market, and with a severe decline in the bicycle components industry, the company was reliant on importing those as well, and only assembling at Brigg. By this point, production had dwindled to just under 120,000 bicycles per annum.

Having rebuilt Elswick plc as printing and packaging business focussed on self adhesive labels and garment labels, the group sold the bicycle division to Casket Ltd., a company who controlled the Townsend brand. Having sold the dilapidated Barton-upon-Humber site, in September 1994 the residual Elswick plc sold itself to Ferguson International, which itself went into liquidation in January 2000.

== Present ==
Casket Ltd with their greater buying power enabled an expansion of the Falcon brand, but themselves ran into difficulty after buying a German-based bicycle manufacturer. Sold to Tandem Group plc in November 1995, the company is now a division of Falcon, which has annual sales in excess of 300,000 bicycles.
