= Super galaxy =

Supergalaxy, super-galaxy, or super galaxy may refer to:

== Astronomy ==
- a term for the Virgo Cluster of galaxies and its outlying members
- a reference to the organization of the supergalactic coordinates system
- Brightest cluster galaxy
- a giant galaxy (i.e. giant elliptical, gE, cD, D), see galaxy
- a system of a central galaxy, and satellite galaxies

== Games and storylines ==
- Super Galaxy Invader and Super Galaxy Invasion, a handheld videogame by Bandai
- Super Galaxy, a handheld clone videogame of Asteroids (video game)
- Super Galaxy, an Ultraman storyline
- Super Galaxy, a mecha (Mega) from Power Rangers and Sentai Rangers
- Legend of the Super Galaxy, part of Cyborg 009

== Other uses ==
- C-5M Super Galaxy, a military cargo transport aircraft
- Super Galaxy, a bicycle manufactured by Dawes Cycles
