= Falcon Cycles =

British bicycle manufacturer based in Brigg, North Lincolnshire, owned by Tandem Group

- Company type: Private
- Industry: Bicycles and accessories
- Predecessor: Coventry-Eagle
- Founded: 1880
- Headquarters: Brigg, North Lincolnshire, England
- Area served: United Kingdom
- Products: Boss, Claud Butler, CBR, British Eagle, Coventry-Eagle, Elswick, Exile, Falcon, Holdsworth, Scorpion, Shogun, Stinky Bitz, Townsend
- Owner: Tandem Group plc
- Website: www.falconcycles.co.uk

Falcon Cycles is a British bicycle manufacturer which was based in Brigg, North Lincolnshire, owned by Tandem Group.

== History ==
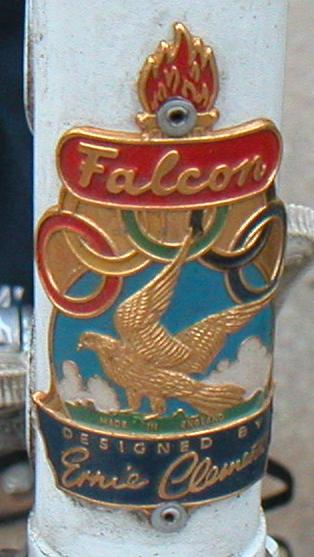
Falcon head badge

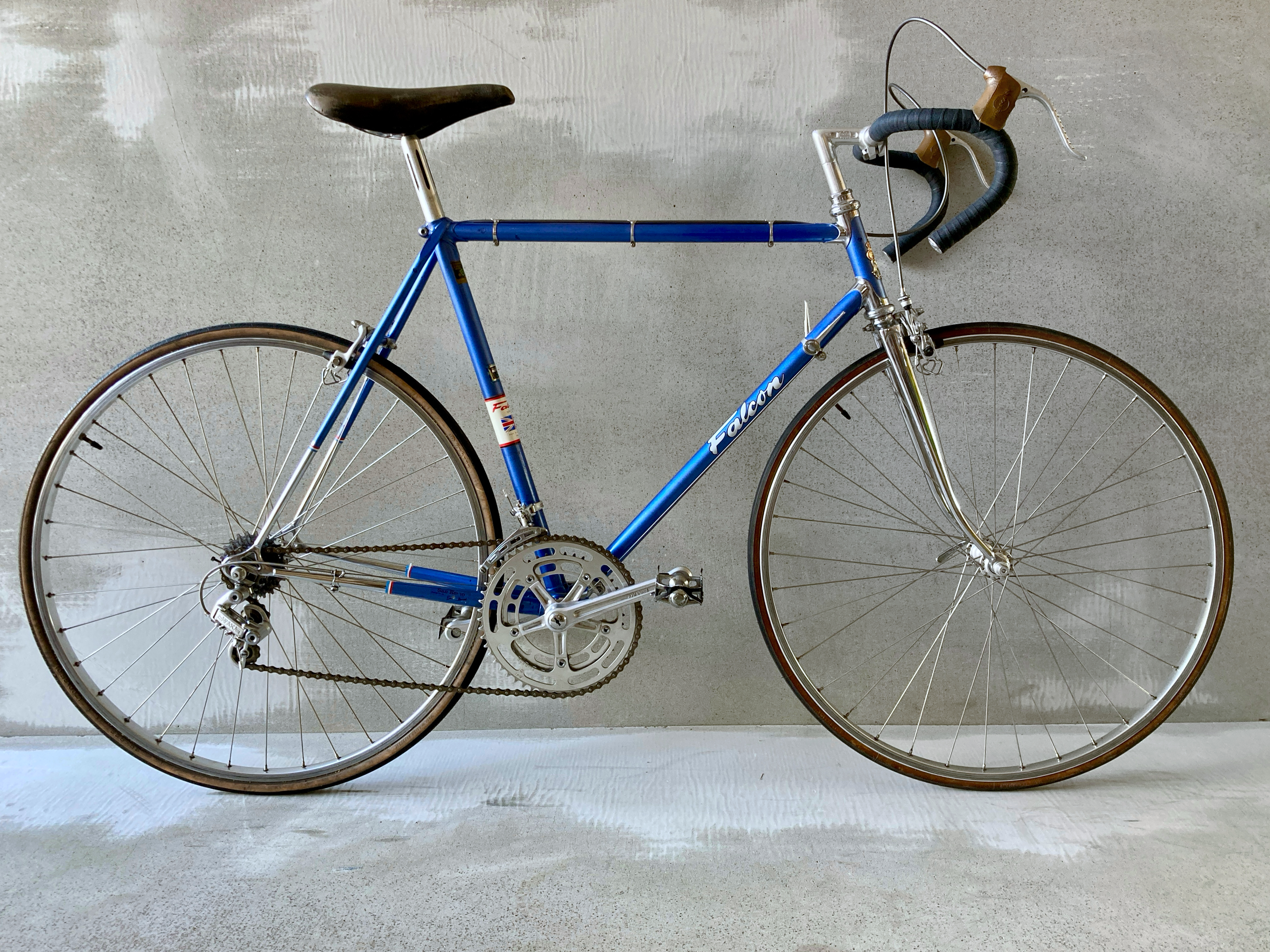
For many years, the San Remo was the top‑of‑the‑line model. Shown here is the 1977 version.

In the 1880s, Hotchkiss, Mayo & Meek Ltd was established in Coventry as a manufacturer of bicycles. In 1897, the company name was changed to Coventry-Eagle when John Meek left the company.

From 1898, like many bicycle manufacturers they began experimenting by adding small petrol-engines to their heavier bicycle frames. By 1899 they produced their first motorcycle, manufactured along bicycle lines from carefully manufactured components. By the start of World War I, the range included Villiers and JAP engines. Sourcing engines from four manufacturers post the war into the 1920s, during the depression of the 1930s the company concentrated on producing two-strokes. Production of motorcycles continued until the start of the World War II in 1939.

=== Post-WW2 ===
After the war, and not of a scale to continue competitive motorcycle manufacture, the company concentrated on racing bicycles.

In the 1930s, they had launched a range of sporting bikes under the "Falcon" brand, and it was under this marque that the company relaunched itself. Managed from the 1950s under British bicycle racer Ernie Clements, in the 1970s the company signed a global licensing agreement with Belgian-racer Eddy Merckx brand, who at the time was the leading global road cycling racer. This allowed the company to greatly expand, and export large numbers of Merckx bikes to the United States.

=== Elswick Hopper ===
In 1974, rival bicycle manufacturer Elswick Hopper plc began a period of expansion, purchasing Wearwell Cycles, which had been established before 1872. In 1978 the company acquired Falcon Cycles, which was operated as a subsidiary before being later merged into Elswick Hopper's factory at Barton-upon-Humber, North Lincolnshire.

By the mid-1980s, Elswick Hopper plc was a diversified conglomerate, spanning manufacturing, engineering, and distribution. But the company was losing money at both group and subsidiary level, and was in desperate need of reorganisation. Under a new Chief Executive, the group company renamed itself Elswick plc in 1984, and renamed its bicycle division Falcon Cycles, the name of its most popular selling sports bicycle brand. Ending production of bicycles under the Elswick brand in the same year, all bicycle manufacture was moved to a new factory at Brigg. In 1987 the company later added the Holdsworth and Claud Butler brands to its top-of-the-range portfolio.

However, by the late 1980s cheap imports from Asia were flooding the UK market, and with a severe decline in the bicycle components industry, the company was reliant on importing those as well, and only assembling at Brigg. By this point, production had dwindled to just under 120,000 bicycles per annum. In an effort to stimulate sales and hence stem losses, Falcon were involved in cycle racing in the late 1980s and early 1990s, sponsoring and supplying the PMS Falcon and later the Banana Falcon teams.

Having rebuilt Elswick plc as printing and packaging business focussed on self adhesive and garment labels, the group sold the bicycle division to Casket Ltd., a company who controlled the import-only Townsend brand. Casket Ltd with their greater buying power enabled an expansion of the Falcon brand, but ran into difficulty themselves after buying a German-based bicycle manufacturer.

== Present ==
Sold to Tandem Group plc in November 1995, Falcon Cycles and Dawes Cycles are now the two sub-groups which make up Tandem's Cycles division.

The Falcon Cycles division is responsible for producing bikes and accessories under both its own name, as well as under the brand names of: Boss, Claud Butler, CBR, British Eagle, Coventry-Eagle, Elswick, Exile, Holdsworth, Scorpion, Shogun, Stinky Bitz and import-only Townsend brands. The Falcon Cycles division now has annual sales in excess of 300,000 bicycles.

== See also ==
- List of bicycle manufacturing companies
- Raleigh Cycles - Biggest UK manufacture at one period
