= Coventry-Eagle =

British bicycle manufacturer

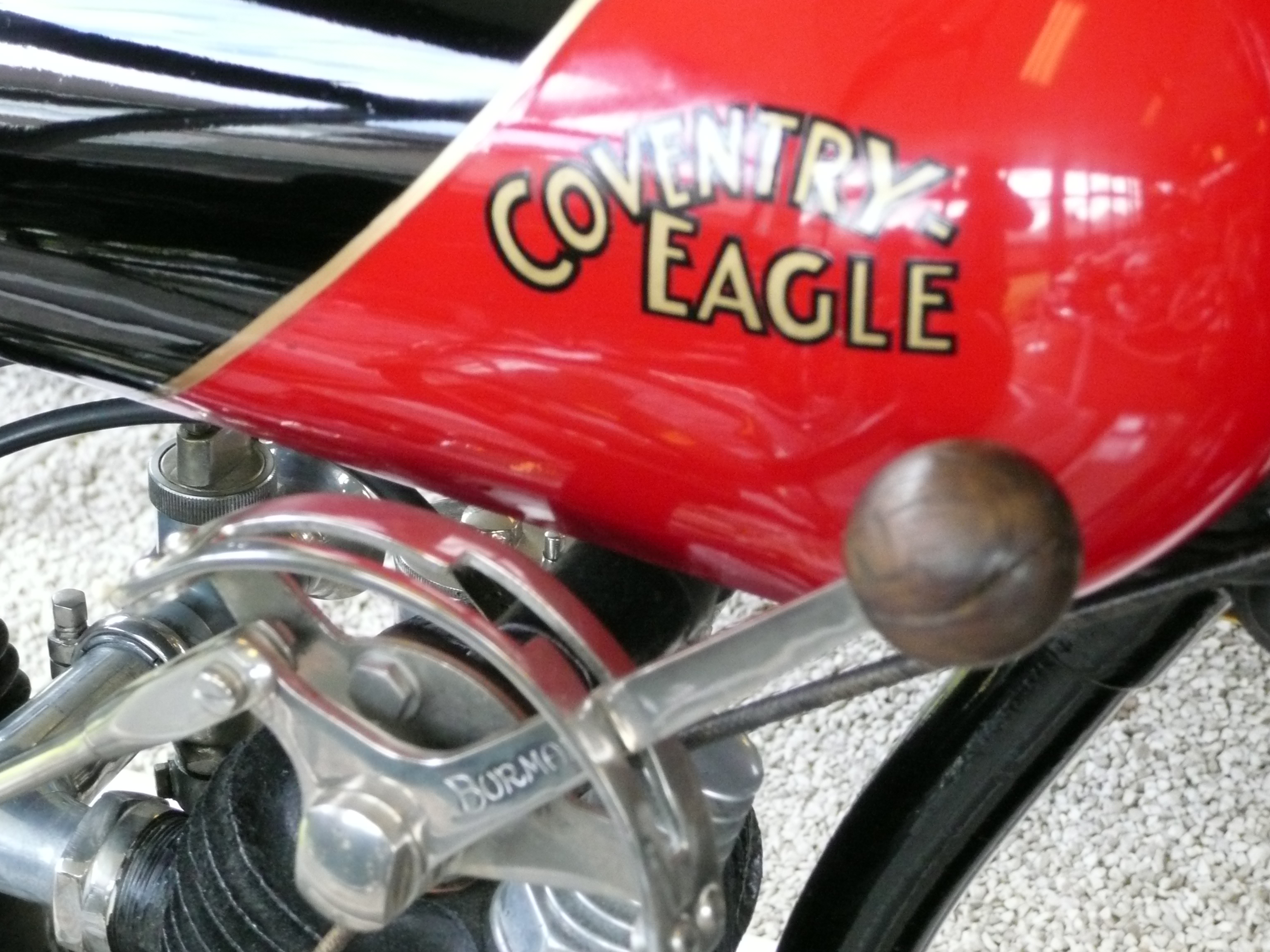
- Industry: manufacturing and engineering
- Founded: 1903
- Defunct: 1939
- Fate: Closed by World War II
- Successor: Falcon Cycles
- Headquarters: Coventry, England
- Products: Motorcycles and bicycles

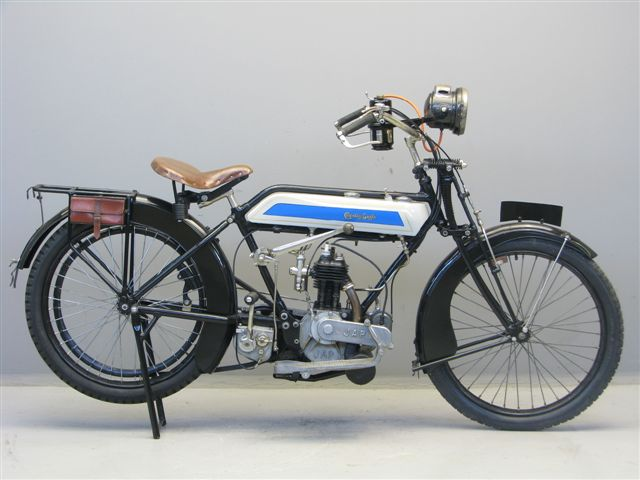
1920 Coventry-Eagle with 2.75 hp JAP four-stroke engine

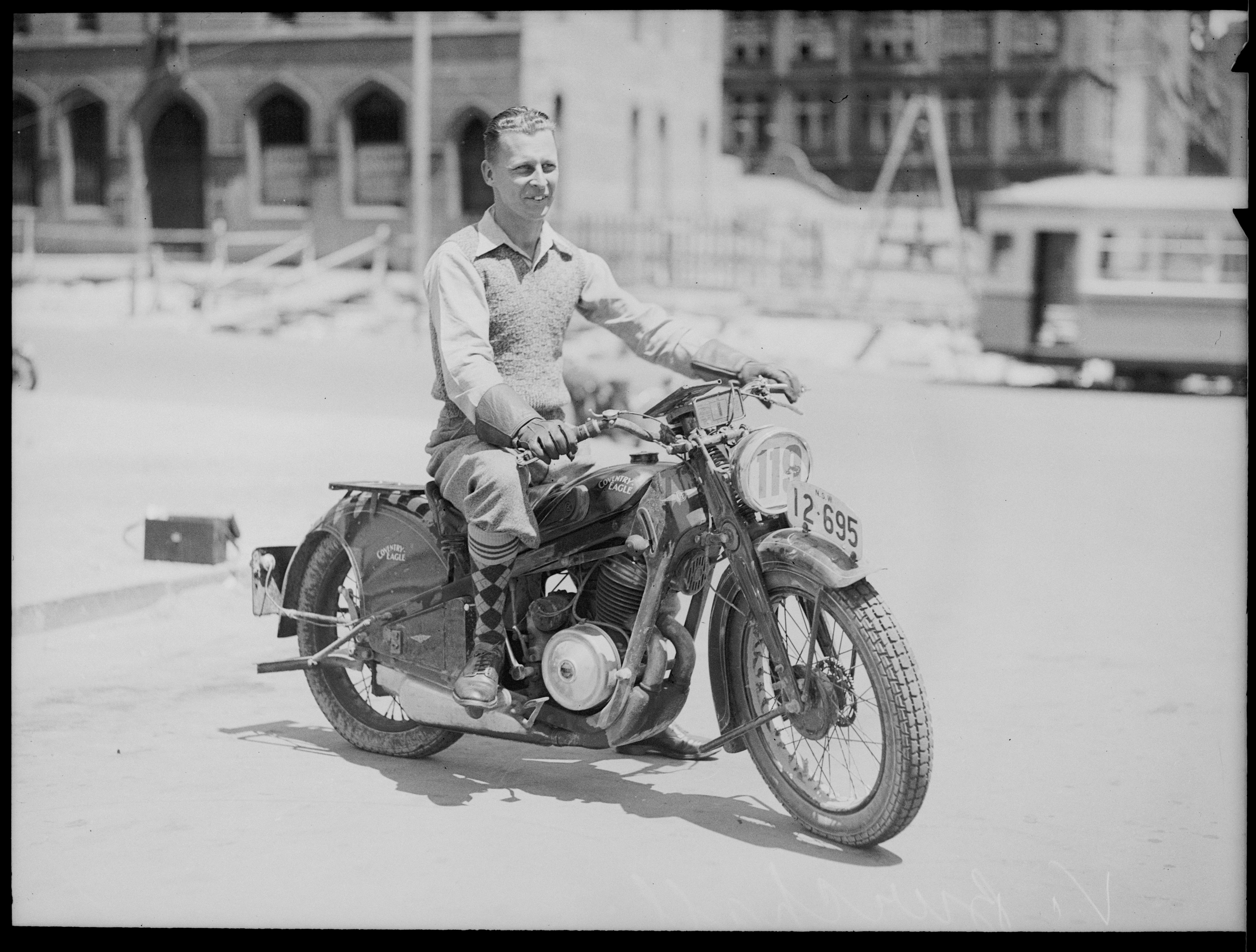
Rider on a Coventry-Eagle in, Australia, circa 1935. The machine has a pressed steel frame; Villiers two-stroke engine; and twin exhausts.

Coventry-Eagle was a British bicycle and motorcycle manufacturer. Established as a Victorian bicycle maker, the company began under the name of Hotchkiss, Mayo & Meek. The company name was changed to Coventry Eagle in 1897 when John Meek left the company . By 1898 they had begun to experiment with motorised vehicles and by 1899, had produced their first motorcycle. The motorcycles were hand built from components and finished carefully, Coventry-Eagle motorcycles proved reliable and by the First World War the range included Villiers Engineering and JAP engines.

In the early 1920s, Coventry-Eagle changed its models, depending on what engines were available. It swapped between five engine manufacturers: Villiers; JAP; Sturmey-Archer; Blackburne; and Matchless. The model Flying 8 bore a resemblance to the contemporary Brough Superior. During the depression of the 1930s, the company concentrated on producing two-strokes. Production continued until the start of the Second World War in 1939.

In the 1930s they had launched a range of sporting bikes under the "Falcon" brand. After the war, and not of a scale to continue competitive motorcycle manufacture, the company concentrated on their racing bicycles. It was under this marque that the company relaunched itself as Falcon Cycles, now a division of Tandem Group.

== Models ==
Model	Year	Comments
269 cc	1913	Villiers-powered two-speed
3.5 hp	1913	Single
5 hp	1914	Three-speed V-twin
500 cc single	1921	
680 cc V-Twin	1921	JAP engine
Flying 8	1923	
8 hp Super Sports Twin	1923	
Flying 6	1927	674 cc side-valve twin
150 cc	1935	Coventry Eagle twin-port two-stroke and with a left-hand gear change and Albion gearbox
L5 249 cc 35 Silent Superb De Luxe	1935	Villiers engine and a 4-speed albion gearbox
N35	1937	Flying 350
N11 250 cc	1937	Pullman
