= Evans Cycles =

British bicycle retailer

Evans Cycles Limited
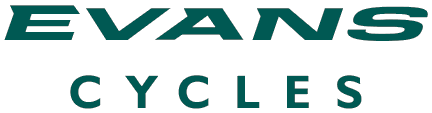

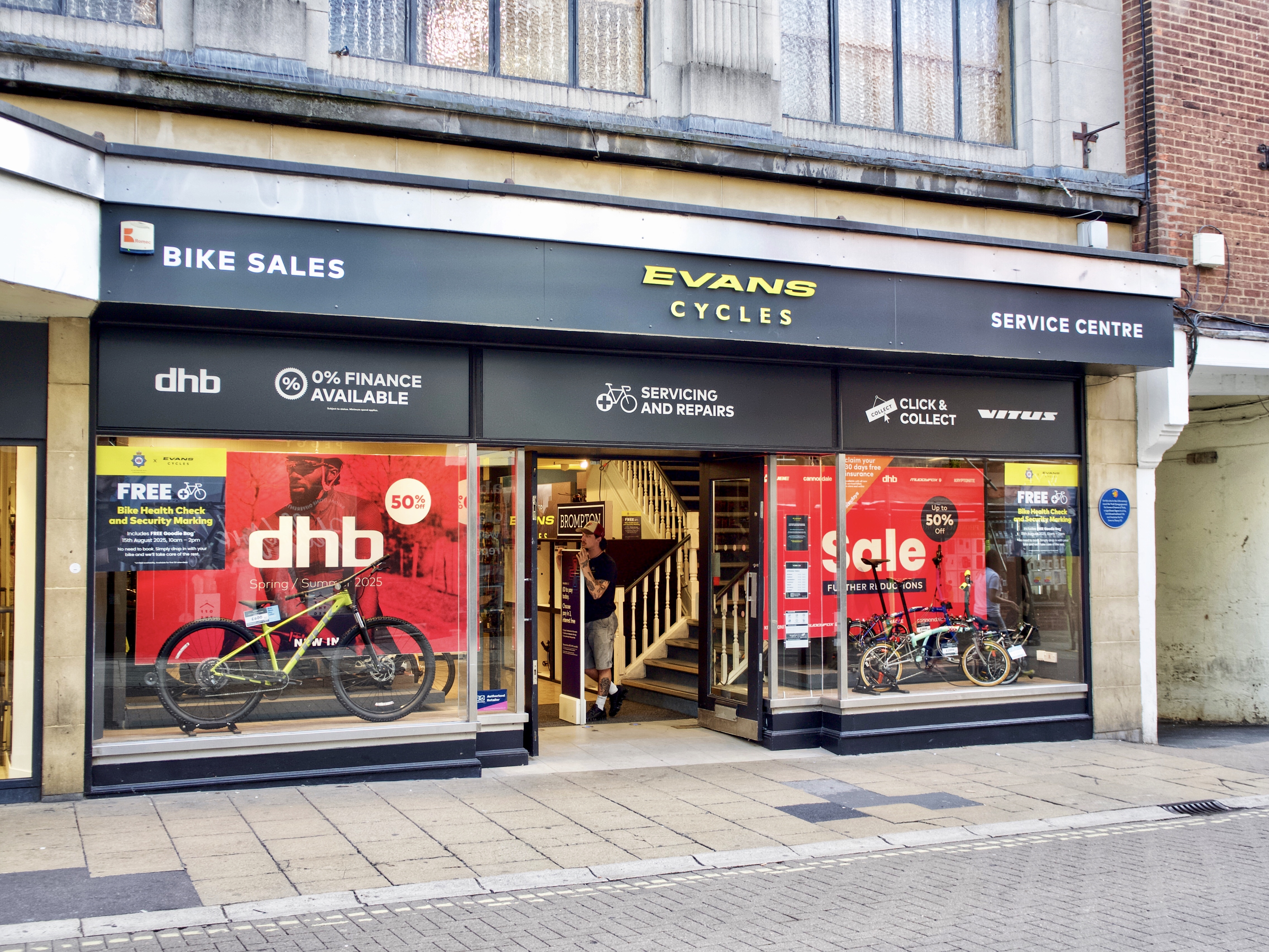
- Branch in York, UK
- Trade name: Evans Cycles
- Type: Private
- Industry: Cycling
- Founded: 1921; 105 years ago in London
- Founder: Frederick Evans
- Headquarters: Shirebrook, England, UK
- Number of locations: 50+ stores (2024)
- Area served: United Kingdom
- Key people: David Crapper (Head of Retail)
- Revenue: ▼£40.1 million (2024)
- Net income: ▼£-3.3 million (2024)
- Number of employees: 500+
- Parent: Frasers Group
- Divisions: Evans GO
- Website: www.evanscycles.com

Evans Cycles Limited is a British cycle retailer based in Shirebrook, England. It was opened in Central London by a London cyclist, Frederick Evans, who won an award from Britain's largest cycling club for the best cycling invention of 1925. He left his shop to be run by his manager and joined the Royal Air Force when World War II broke out in 1939. He died in a road accident in 1944 and the shop and the national business that developed from it has had several owners.

Evans' own brands include the Pinnacle range of bikes, and the FWE brand of basic accessories. The firm was acquired by equity companies in 2008, entered administration in 2018, and was then purchased by Sports Direct.

== History ==
=== First years and development ===
The business was created by a London cyclist, Frederick W. Evans. He created what The Bicycle UK magazine described as a quick-release and reversible rear wheel device, for which he received an award for.

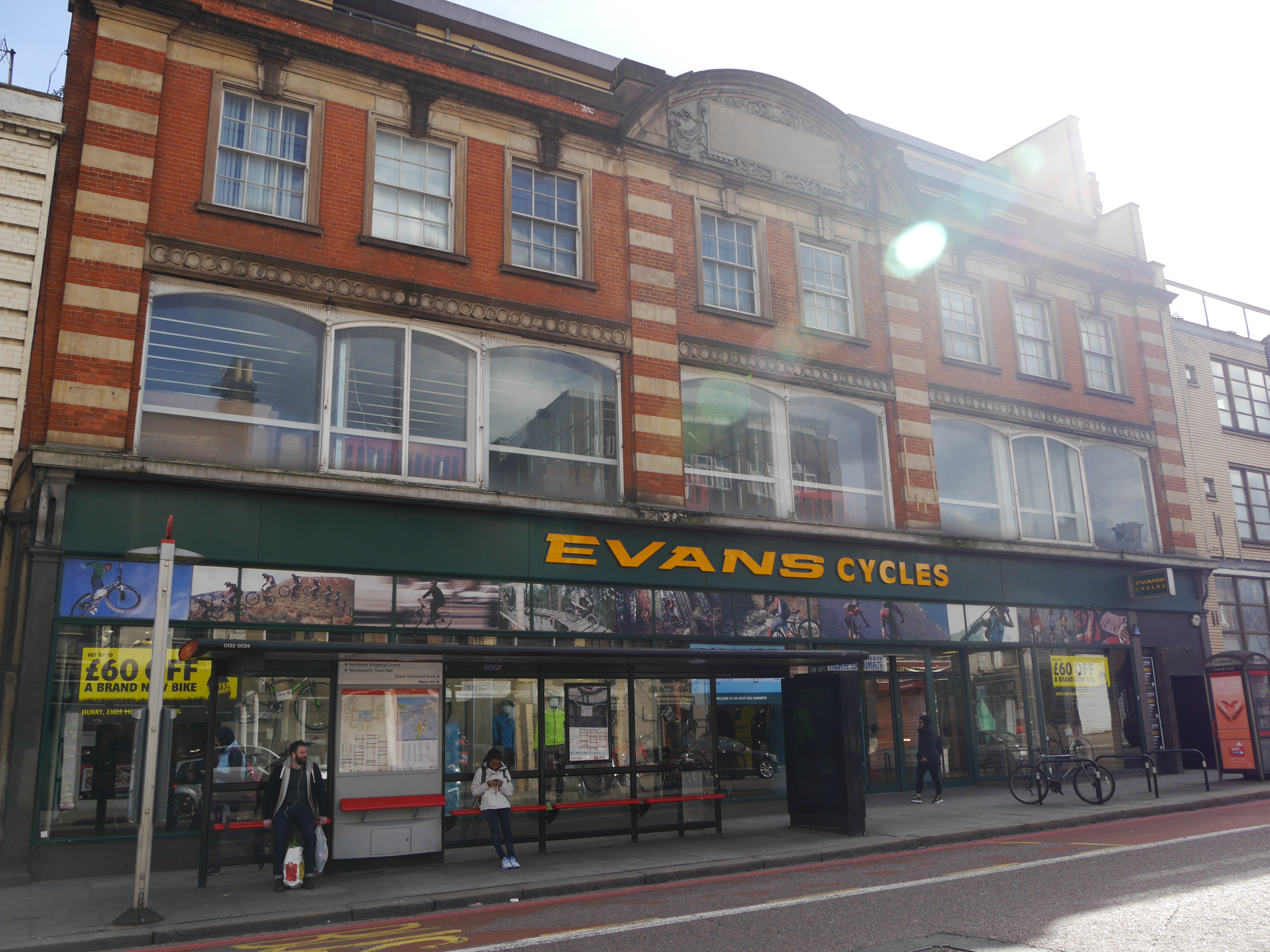
Evans Cycles store in Wandsworth High Street, London, 2016

Evans edited the Cyclists' Touring Club's Cycling magazine before opening a bike shop in Westminster Bridge Road known as F.W. Evans Cycles in 1922. He is credited with inventing frames with a double fixed hub and rear-dropout screw adjusters that became almost standard on quality frames. He specialised in building touring bikes and in the 1930s offered French-designed Cyclo derailleurs allowing up to 12 gears at a time when most UK bikes were fitted with 2 or 3-speed hub gears. He also offered touring refinements such as braze-ons for racks, and hub brakes.

In 1924, Evans became the first president of the newly formed cycle racing club, South Eastern Road Club, a position he held until 1944.

With the outbreak of war in 1939 he joined the Royal Air Force and left the business in the charge of his manager. The shop traded from this site for 30 years. Evans died in a road accident in 1944, having never again run his shop. He was by then in the educational engineering branch of the RAF.

When Evans died during the war (knocked down by a milk float) his wife took over the business for several years, before selling it to Joe Smith in the 1950s. At the time the shop built frames and sold cycles and toys and later moved to Kennington Road. In the 1970s Smith handed the business to his son, Gary, who expanded the business dramatically. After more than 50 years at Kennington Road, the site came up for development. The shop moved to Waterloo, at 77-79 The Cut (which closed mid-2019).

During the 1990s the stores were mostly franchised but in the 2000s, Gary worked with Mike Rice, the Croydon store franchise owner, to buy back the franchised stores to become part of F.W. Evans Cycles (UK) and by 2013 there were 47 stores. During this time the Evans Cycles mail order catalogue was launched, requiring a central distribution centre, later established in Leatherhead, Surrey. This coincided with the Evans Cycles website being established. The business outgrew its distribution centre in Leatherhead. In 2001 the head office and distribution centre moved to Gatwick, Sussex, which has now moved to Shirebrook.

=== Acquisitions ===
The company was acquired by the firm Active Private Equity in 2008 for £30 million. British private equity firm ECI Partners then acquired a majority stake in the company in May 2015 for £75 million.

On 30 October 2018, Evans Cycles entered administration, and was purchased by Sports Direct (now, Frasers Group) in a pre-pack administration for £8 million. At the time of its insolvency in 2018 the company had 60 stores UK-wide.

In 2019, despite many store closures following the insolvency, the company opened its 4th Glasgow store and an additional branch in Shirebrook, both within flagship TRI UK stores.

After the takeover by Sports Direct there were complaints about poor customer service, which formerly had been very good, according to those customers.
