= JumpSport =

JumpSport, Inc.
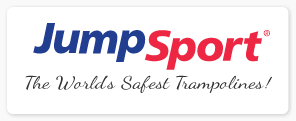
- Type: Private
- Industry: Sporting goods manufacturer
- Predecessor: JumpSport, LLC
- Founded: Saratoga, California (May 1, 1998)
- Founder: Mark Publicover; Valerie Publicover; Byron Lewis Bertsch
- Headquarters: San Jose, California, United States
- Area served: Worldwide
- Products: Trampolines
- Revenue: US$13 million (2007)
- Number of employees: 15 (2007)
- Website: jumpsport.com

JumpSport, Inc. is a manufacturer of recreational trampolines and accessories that are distributed worldwide. JumpSport markets and sells a patented trampoline safety net enclosure which was invented by one of the company's founders, Mark Publicover.

== History ==
The company was founded in January 1997 by Mark Publicover, his wife, Valerie, and then board chairman Byron Lewis Bertsch as a California limited liability company that was subsequently merged into the JumpSport California corporation created in May 1998. Originally they created the company to market the safety net enclosure system which Publicover had patented. JumpSport initially had its trampolines manufactured by Hedstrom out of Bedford, PA but, due to competitive pressures, they transitioned to overseas production in the 2000s. The company distributes to multiple retailers nationally.

In 2000, JumpSport received funding from the Band of Angels. Also in 2000, the company become one of 35 founding members of the U.S. Consumer Product Safety Commission's (CPSC) "Product Safety Circle".

In 2007, JumpSport's 15 employee business had $13 million in sales and represented less than 1% of the market for safety net enclosures.

JumpSport expanded their line to include fitness trampolines in 2008. In 2011, they extended into the age 2–5 market with the introduction of the "iBounce" trampoline with integrated iPad/tablet holder.
