= British Eagle (bicycle company) =

British Eagle cycle company logo from 1989 catalogue

British Eagle was a cycle manufacturer, initially based in Mochdre near Newtown, Powys, that previously closed in the mid-1990s. At some point it received financial support from the Development Board for Rural Wales. UK Companies house shows British Eagle Cycles Limited was dissolved on 5 July 1994. A similarly named "British Eagle Cycle Company Limited" was registered in Peterborough on 11 July 1989 and dissolved on 29 June 2004. It seems to have been associated with Falcon Cycles and Coventry Eagle. Recently in 2020 "British Eagle" registered with Brothers Bike Co INDIA.

Professional cyclist Barry Hoban was the company's marketing manager.

A touring frame, named Touristique, made from 531ST Reynolds steel with Shimano 500LX groupset including Biopace chainring appears the most remembered model.

British Eagle Touristique from 1989 catalogue

The company may have also produced competition frames, the Campionissimo and Primavera.

The 1989 catalogue lists seven mountain-bikes: Volcanic, Fireball, Shadow, Summit, Inferno, Fuego, Capri; one tourer, the Touristique, and a road bike, Competition.

The brand name has more recently appeared on bikes sold by supermarkets. ASDA were criticised by cycling and mainstream press for displaying the bike set up with the front forks reversed.

The brand is now owned by MV Sports & Leisure, alongside a range of largely children-oriented branded sports toys. MV Sports is a subsidiary of Tandem Group, which also owns Dawes and Claud Butler under other subsidiaries.
