= South Eastern Road Club =

British cycling club

- The club's logo dates back to the formation of the club, appearing on the front of the first handbook
- Abbreviation: SERC
- Formation: 1924
- Dissolved: 2025
- Type: Cycling club
- Location: South London, Great Britain
- Website: https://www.facebook.com/SouthEasternRoadClub/

The South Eastern Road Club (SERC) was a British amateur cycling club, formed in 1924, based in south London. It promoted a range of cycling events as well as supporting riders in their cycle racing endeavors.

The club had notable periods of success from the 1950s into the 1990s, with numerous members competing in men's and women's events, in all age categories. During its heyday, club riders competed in national time trial championships and the British BAR (best all rounder), as well as achieving wins in regional open events. The national record for the women's 25-mile time trial was broken in 1950 by a club rider.

The club was officially disbanded in October 2025, however a number of ex-members continue to meet for social activities.

== History ==
The South Eastern Road Club was formed in 1924 as the racing off-shoot of the south-eastern section of the Cyclist Touring Club (CTC), to facilitate cycle racing for men and women in south-east England. A group of would-be racers, led by Charles "Tom" Cannon, F. W. Evans, J. Slade, H. H. "Chater" Willis, W. F. Holdsworth, G. H. Wilcox and E. Durden got together with around twenty other like-minded cyclists, and the club was born.

=== 1920s and 1930s ===
The first club handbook

The club published its first handbook in 1925 and each year thereafter for its members. The handbooks contained a diary of events, the previous year's award winners, club records and club rules.

The SERC's first president was F. W. Evans (the founder of Evans Cycles), who reigned from 1924 to 1944. Evans was killed in December 1944, while out cycling. The first general secretary was Tom Cannon, 1924 to 1929. Cannon died while taking part in a club activity in March 1929, aged 31. Memorial trophies to both men were purchased by the club and were awarded every year in club competitions. The club's first handicapper was W. F. Holdsworth, founder of Holdsworth Cycles.

The club's initial focus was on time trialing, where riders raced individually against the clock, over set distances. However, the club recognised the need to cater for other types of event including road racing (massed start) and track racing, the latter being held at the Herne Hill Velodrome in South London.

In 1926, the SERC formed a long-standing association with the Essex-based Eagle Road Club. The "Interclub 50", a 50-mile time trial, ridden on an Essex course, became a permanent fixture on the racing calendar. In later years, the event was held over a 25-mile distance and alternated between courses in Essex and Surrey.

=== 1940s and 1950s ===
Jersey designs from 1953-2025

In 1947, the club adopted orange and black as their official colours. Prior to this, the tradition was for racing cyclists to wear all black. In 1953, green was added. Various styles of club clothing were designed over the years, but orange, green and black remained.

During the 1940s and 1950s, women's cycling competition throughout the country reached a peak, and one of those at the top was club member Joyce E. Brooker. In 1950, Brooker broke the women's national 25-mile time trial record with a time of 1h 4m 10s, shaving 1m 17s from the previous record. This stood for five years. Brooker also came 4th in the women's British Best All Rounder championship and won over 10 open events that year.

As well as distance events, in 1946, the club held its first hill climb championship on the steep Chalk Pits road near Oxted, Surrey. In later years, it was relocated to the less-challenging Star Hill in Knockholt, to encourage more riders to enter. This event became a permanent fixture on the racing calendar. In 1957, the club held track racing events and track standards/records were established for the first time.

=== 1960s and 1970s ===
Major achievements occurred in the early 1970s. R. G. (Bob) Donington had joined the club in the latter part of the 1960s and became the dominant rider of the period, smashing almost every club record. In 1971, Donington, together with P. Holland and P. T. Abbott, won the CTC Best All Rounder Team award for the club. In 1972, Donington came 12th in the national 100-mile time trial Championship, and together with R. Corby and P. T. Abbott, secured 2nd place for the club in the national team competition. However, Donington's finest ride was a 7th place in the national 12hr Championship of 1973.

=== 1980s and 1990s ===
The early 1980s continued where the 1970s had left off. Club records continued to fall at a rapid pace; one 25-mile team record only lasting for two weeks before it was improved again. Richard Hallett gained national coverage when he broke the TT course tricycle record on the Isle of Man.

Steve Marchant, the fastest rider ever to have ridden for the club, gained a silver medal in both the 1984 and the 1985 RTTC National Hill Climb Championships.

In 1990, Marchant, rejoined the club after a few years away and immediately broke three club records. He was placed 4th in the Isle of Man Mountain time trial, and recorded good finishing positions during a summer spent racing in Belgium. Marchant was selected to ride for Great Britain in the World Student Games, and achieved 12th place in the road race and gained the bronze medal in the 100 km team time trial. To top his season, he won the Catford CC and Bec CC Hill Climbs, the latter with a hill record, and came second, again, in the RTTC National Hill Climb Championship.

Marchant continued to break club records. In 1992 he was awarded a gold medal for the first club rider to beat 4 hours in a 100-mile time trial, with a time of 3h 58m 22s, which was never bettered. In 1997 he broke the club 24-hour record which had stood for 34 years.

In 1998, Clive Willsher competed in the multi-event British Amputees Association Federation Games. Willsher won the overall silver medal, clocking two 3rd places, one 4th, two 5ths and one 6th place. In the European Cup for Disabled Riders, Willsher was placed 11th in the hill climb and 7th in the circuit race. To top his season he also collected three silver medals at the Disabled Riders Track Championships at the Manchester Velodrome.

The only club record to have eluded Steve Marchant was the 10-mile time trial, which had been set by Michael Oliver in 1983. However, in 1999 Marchant bettered it with a ride of 19m 54s, breaking the 30mph barrier for the first time by a club rider. He also broke his own 25-mile record in the same year, which had stood since 1990.

=== 2000 - 2020 ===
During the first few years of the 2000s, the SERC continued to run a full program of club events and hosted several open events per year. It formed a friendly association with the Old Portlians cycling club, with inter-club events being held each year. However, the club struggled to attract new / younger members needed to maintain the events schedule and sustain the strength it had enjoyed in former years. Open event successes became fewer although a small enthusiastic core of riders remained.

=== Closure ===
By 2020, the membership had dwindled to around 20, so the committee put in place a process for the closure of the club and disposal of its assets, should it become necessary. In 2025, after 101 years, the club was finally disbanded, and its assets shared among the remaining members.

Although the SERC no longer exists as a cycling club, a number of former members meet throughout the year and maintain their friendship via social media.

== Club time trial records ==
Progression of records 1925-1999
	1925	1974	1999
10 mls	n/a	22m 26s	19m 54s
25 mls	1h 10m 05s	55m 50s	51m 43s
50 mls	2h 27m 11s	1h 55m 10s	1h 50m 08s
100 mls	5h 25m 35s	4h 09m 40s	3h 58m 22s
12 hour	197.774 mls	254.06 mls	259.794 mls
24 hour	n/a	444.28 mls	467.180 mls

Men's records
	Time/Dist.	Name	Year
10 mls	19m 54s	S. Marchant	1999
25 mls	51m 44s	S. Marchant	1999
30 mls	1h 06m 04s	S. Marchant	1983
50 mls	1h 50m 08s	S. Marchant	1996
100 mls	3h 58m 22s	S. Marchant	1992
12 hour	259.794 mls	S. Marchant	1997
24 hour	467.180 mls	S. Marchant	1997

Women's records
	Time/Dist.	Name	Year
10 mls	24m 57s	M. Kent	1979
25 mls	1h 03m 55s	L.J. Smith	1968
30 mls	1h 19m 02s	M. Kent	1980
50 mls	2h 14m 47s	M. Kent	1979
100 mls	4h 47m 47s	J.E. Brooker	1950
12 hour	223.875 mls	J.E. Brooker	1950

== Awards and trophies ==
Original club emblem used on medals and trophies. This image is of the emblem on the "Tom Cannon" Perpetual Memorial Shield and dates from 1930.

From the earliest days, the club set out to ensure riders were rewarded for their achievements. Time trial Standard Medals were awarded to riders improving their personal bests and trophies were awarded in club competitions. A total of 40 trophies were available to be won per year, although not all were awarded every year.

Notable trophies included:-

- Blain Cup. Awarded annually for outstanding performance or achievement in a cycling or non-cycling capacity.
- F. W. Evans Memorial Cup (1946). Awarded annually to the rider achieving the greatest distance in a 12-hour event.
- F. W. Evans L.C.M.A Memorial Cup. Awarded to the winner of the SERC open 25 mile time trial.
- J. F. E. Wilde Memorial Trophy. Awarded for best performances by an under 16 year old.
- Ladies 25 Cup (1957). Awarded to the fastest 25 miles time trial of the year by a lady rider.
- Palmer Trophy (1928). Awarded by the Palmer Tyre Company and presented annually to the winner of the short-distance competition.
- Slade Cup, formerly the Dunlop Cup. Awarded to the fastest rider in the Inter-club 50 with the Eagle Road Club.
- Stone Time Trial Championship Cup (1952). Awarded annually to the Club Time Trial Champion.
- Tom Cannon Perpetual Memorial Shield (1930). Awarded annually to the rider with the highest placing in Open events.
- Tricycle 25 Trophy. Awarded annually for the fastest 25 mile time trial on a tricycle.
- Veterans Trophy. Awarded to the rider over 40 years of age, with the highest points total in the veterans competition.
