= Trampoline safety net enclosure =

Trampoline accessory

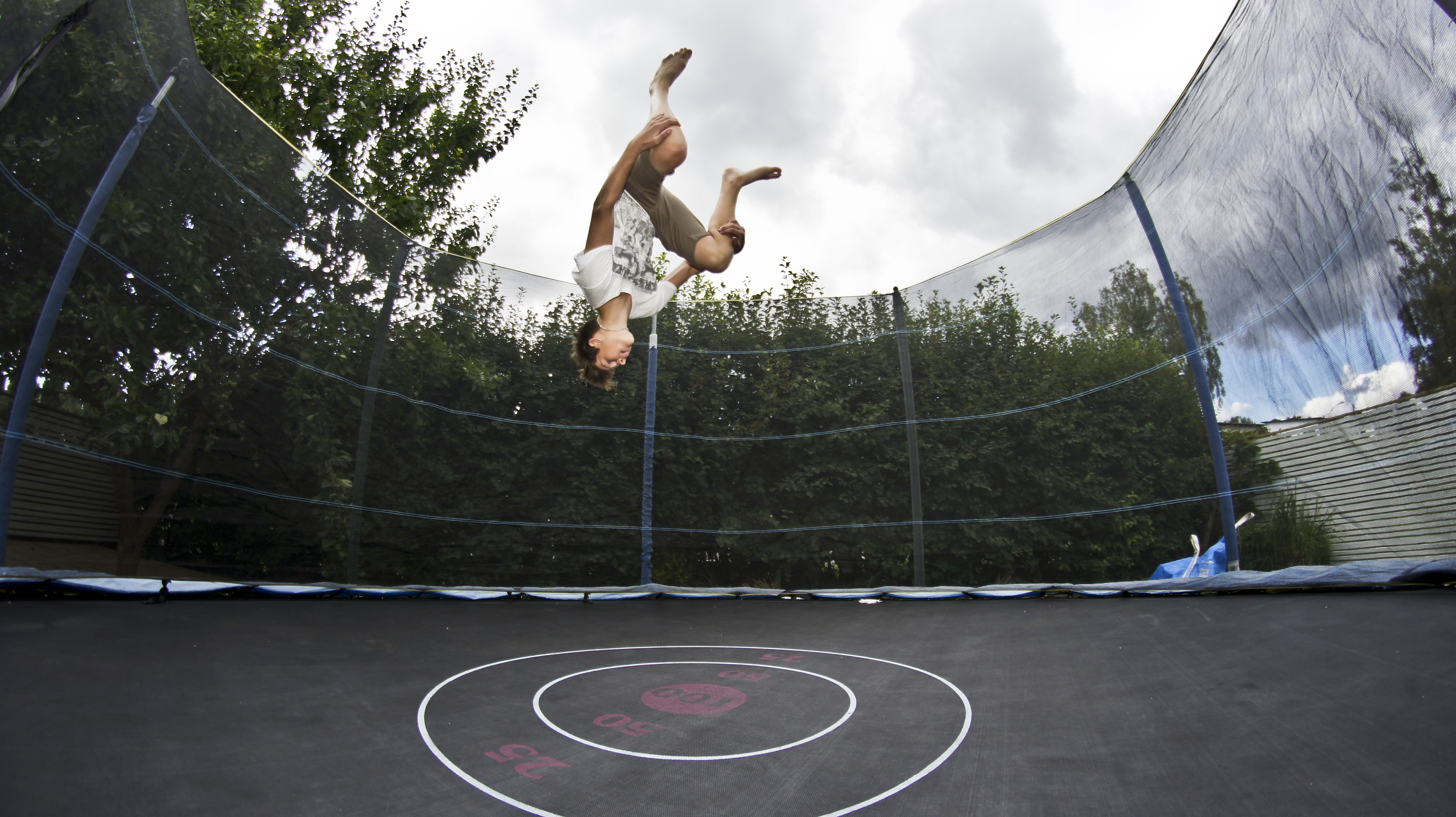
A jumper doing a flip on a trampoline with a safety net enclosure

A trampoline safety net enclosure is a trampoline accessory that significantly reduces the chance of fall off and frame impact injuries.

== History ==
The first commercially successful trampoline safety net enclosures were invented and patented by Mark Publicover in the United States and first sold there in 1997 by JumpSport Trampolines. By 2006 80% of all new trampoline sales included safety net enclosures.

== Safety benefits ==
While a trampoline is safest when only one person jumps at a time, in practice the enjoyment derived from multiple simultaneous jumpers means that this recommendation is often disregarded. The benefit of an enclosure is that it keeps jumpers from falling off a trampoline or impacting the frame.

Safety net enclosures vary from one manufacturer to another, such as the opening in the net so that jumpers may enter and exit the trampoline. The design of such openings may include: snap/Velcro system, zipper, or overlapping sections. The snap, zipper, and Velcro systems require the person entering to both open and close the entrance, allowing for the possibility of misuse, whereas the doubled over system avoids this requirement by being a passive solution.

== See also ==
- Trampolines
