= Dawes Galaxy =

British range of touring bicycles, 1971–2020

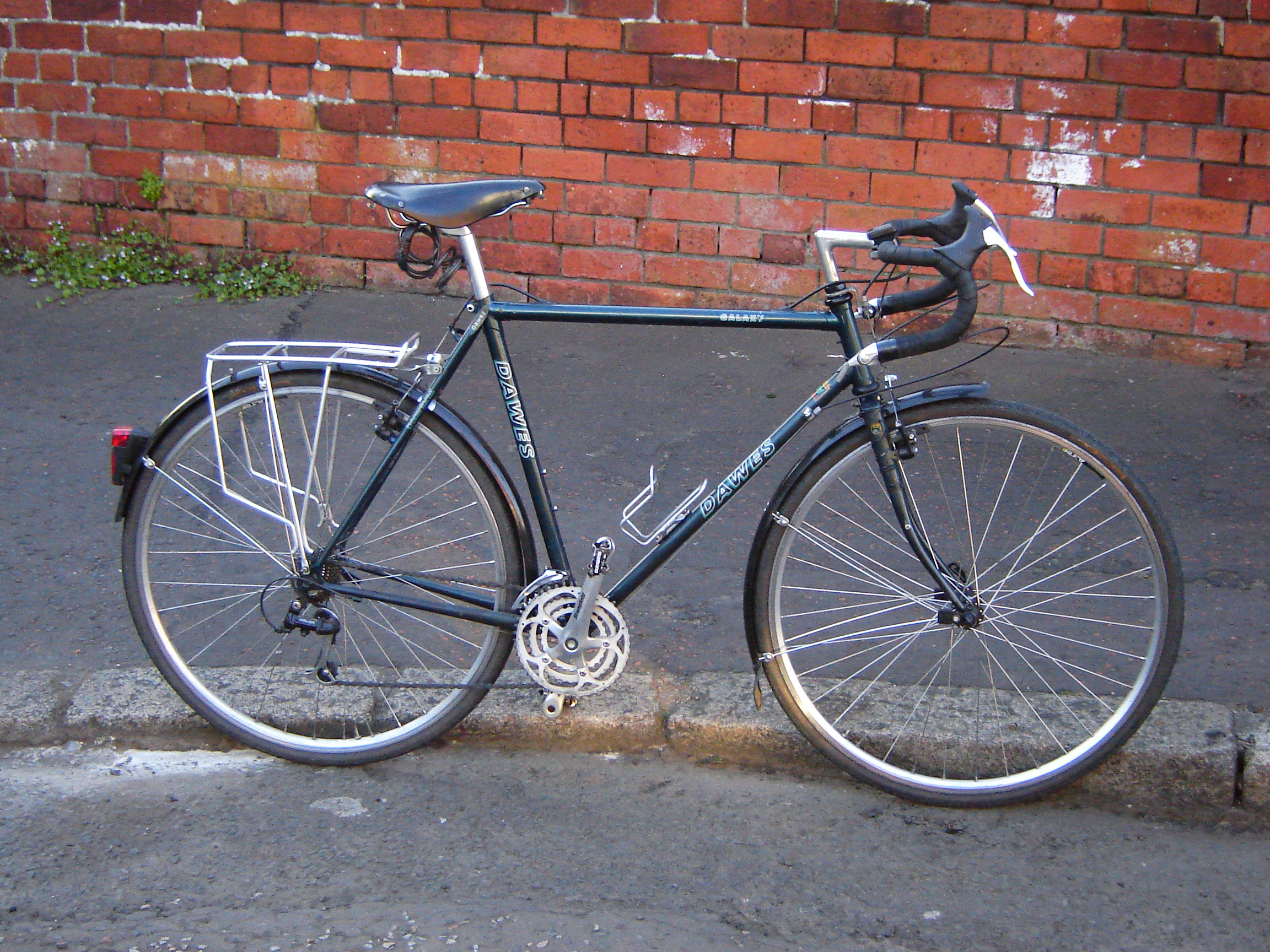
A 1995 Dawes Galaxy

The Dawes Galaxy is a range of touring bicycles manufactured by Dawes of the United Kingdom.

The series became popular among touring cyclists because of features such as their long wheelbase and slightly heavier but stiffer frame, enabling loading of luggage. When introduced in 1971, the Galaxy was an off-the-shelf touring bicycle at a time when touring bikes were most often custom-built and therefore expensive.

By 2009, the range included the Galaxy Cromo, Galaxy Plus, Galaxy Classic, Galaxy Excel, Galaxy Al & Cross Al and the Galaxy Twin tandem bicycle. Frame materials include Reynolds steel, Aluminium alloy and Titanium. In 2011 the range was slimmed down and the Galaxy Plus, Ultra Galaxy (853 Reynolds) and Titanium Ultra Galaxy Ti models dropped. In November 2020 it was announced that manufacture of the Dawes Galaxy line of touring bikes would cease with immediate effect.
