= Dawes Cycles =

English bicycle manufacturer

- Type: Private
- Industry: Bicycle manufacture and accessories
- Predecessor: Humphries and Dawes Company Ltd
- Founded: 1926
- Founder: Charles F. Dawes
- Headquarters: Birmingham, West Midlands, England
- Number of locations: Castle Bromwich (Head Office); Far East/Asia (Production); Brigg, North Lincolnshire (Assembly)
- Area served: United Kingdom
- Products: Dawes brand including Galaxy and Super Galaxy; Barrosa and Dirty brands
- Owner: Tandem Group plc
- Website: www.dawescycles.com

Dawes Cycles is a bicycle manufacturer based in Castle Bromwich, England. Dawes produces a range of bikes including road, mountain bikes and tandems, but is best known for touring bikes, specifically the Galaxy and the Super Galaxy model lines.

== History ==
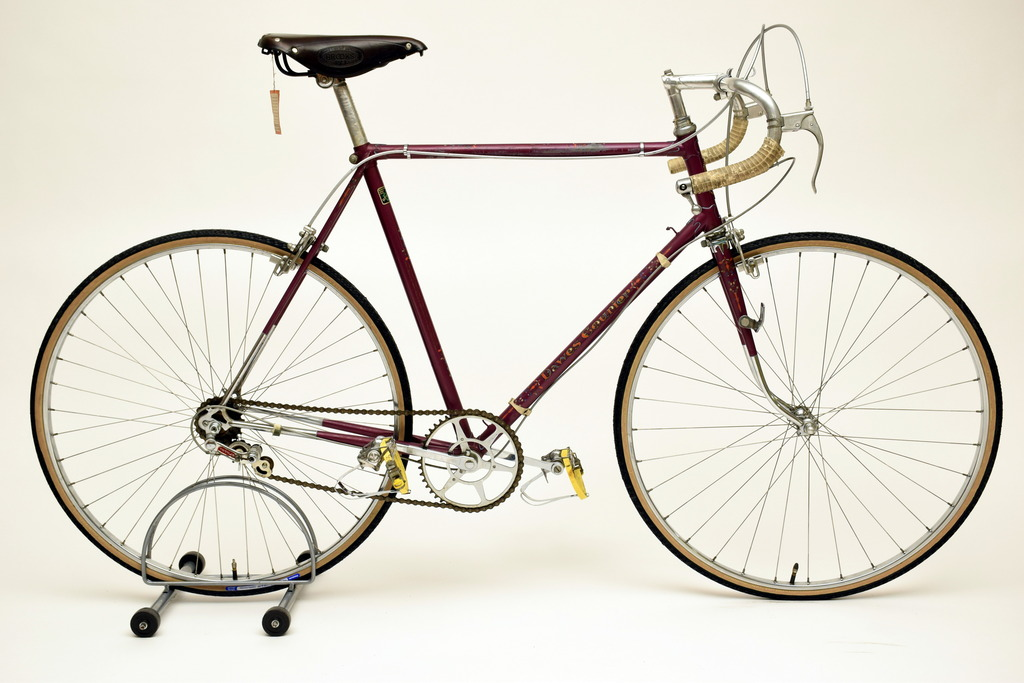
1951 Dawes Courier

In 1906 Major Ernest Humphries and Charles F. Dawes set up the "Humphries and Dawes Company" in Birmingham, England. At first, they produced motorcycles and a few bicycles. But after twenty years, the two partners split up, with Major Humphries setting up a motorcycle manufacturer.

Charles F. Dawes set up Dawes Cycles Ltd in Wharf Dale, Tyseley in 1926, with the company building to become a significant brand in the United Kingdom. Charles left the business around 1930, leaving the running to his son Wilfred P. Dawes, a former estate agent, who died in 1993. He had passed control of the business over to his son Richard Dawes in the 1970s.

Primarily marketing itself a racing cycle manufacturer, Dawes made its money and impact through a combination of noted customer service (it would even undertake repairs at the factory), and a broader range of bicycles calculated to meet real working, commuting and leisure needs. The company built good frames with fine paintwork (though usually without rococo lugs), and by making many of their own components (brakes, pedals, mudguards, etc.), ensured that all the components of the finished bicycle were of high quality. Some vintage Dawes cycles have a distinctive curved seat tube that parallels the rear wheel closely, in order to reduce the wheelbase length.

Dawes presented the "Courier" for the 1951 Festival of Britain, which incorporated a number of hints of the future direction for the company's bikes. Hand-built around a lightweight frame with a long wheelbase (comfortable for long-distance touring), it was equipped with a state-of-the-art ten-gear derailleur system, and was fitted with toecaps and saddlebag. This was followed into production with the more specialist "Windrush", a specific-designed touring bicycle and a direct fore-runner of the later "Galaxy".

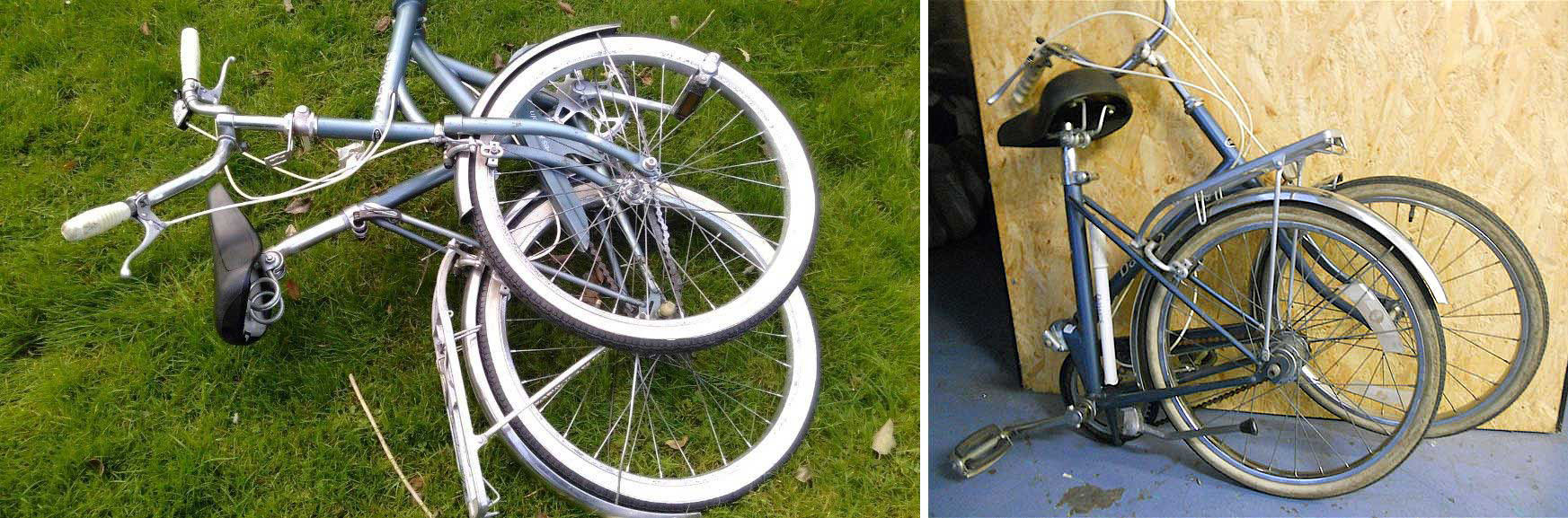
Two different Dawes Kingpin folding bicycles, an original and a later version, in folded state.

The company's response to the 1960s passion for "unisex" small wheeled "shopping" bicycles was the step-framed "Newpin", with single-speed and three-speed Sturmey-Archer enclosed hub gearing systems. These were offered in both a fixed frame and separable two piece frame. It was later renamed as the "Kingpin", Newpin initially being used for the fixed frame version, and offered in a folding frame version that went through a number of developments, and is still in production as of 2018.

In 1971, Dawes first "Galaxy" model appeared, fitted with wide-ratio gears and Reynolds 531 tubing. The Galaxy became the benchmark in the English touring bicycle market.

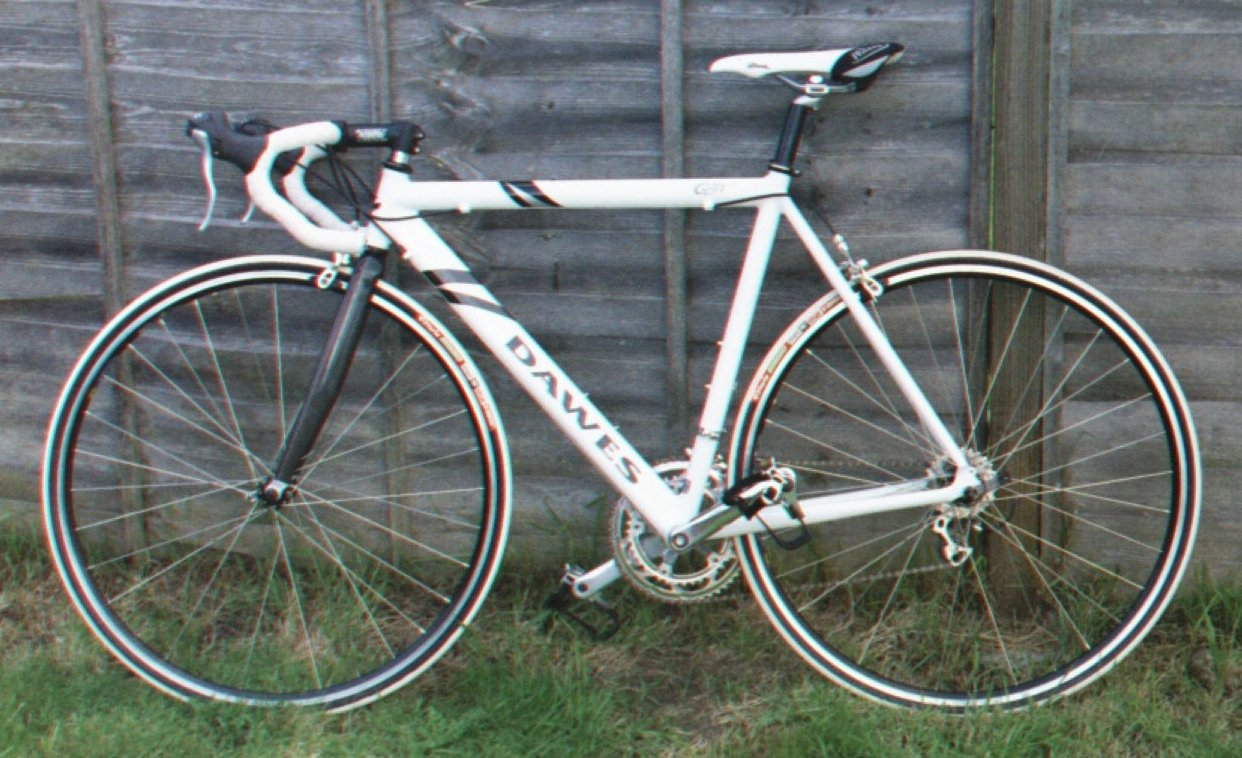
A Giro 400 model racing bike by Dawes. It uses a Shimano chainset and carbon fibre front forks on a butted aluminium frame

By the mid-1970s, the company was still family owned and producing 1000 bicycles a week. Between 1978 and 2001 the company was sold at least five times, passing through the hands of various venture capital and leisure companies. Resultantly, by the mid-1980s, the firm had 50 staff at its dilapidated Tyseley factory. After being bought by ATAG of the Netherlands in 1990, the factory was closed down and production moved to Asia, while the head office moved to Castle Bromwich. In this guise it was bought by Midlands-based investment house Grove Industries in 1998 and sold to Tandem Group Plc in 2001.

== Present ==
Since 2001, Dawes has been owned by Tandem Group plc, owners of Lincolnshire-based Falcon Cycles. Although Dawes bikes are no longer manufactured in the United Kingdom, the research, design and development still comes from their head office staff based in Birmingham. Dawes was one of the first companies to produce a complete single speed mountain bike, the Edge One, and continues to develop new models.

== See also ==
- List of bicycle manufacturing companies
