= Tandem Group =

- Company type: Public limited company
- Traded as: AIM: TND
- Industry: Sporting goods
- Headquarters: Castle Bromwich, Solihull, West Midlands
- Area served: United Kingdom
- Key people: Stephen Grant (Non-Executive Chairman); Peter Kimberley (CEO); Phil Ratcliffe(Group Commercial Director)
- Revenue: £36.8 million (2017)
- Operating income: £2.4 million (2017)
- Net income: £2.2 million (2017)
- Owner: Public Company
- Divisions: Tandem Group Cycles; MV Sports & Leisure; Expressco Direct
- Website: www.tandemgroup.co.uk

Tandem Group is a British-based designer, developer, distributor, and retailer of sports, leisure, and mobility products. Based in Castle Bromwich, West Midlands, the company is listed on the Alternative Investment Market of the London Stock Exchange.

== Operations ==
The group structure comprises three main divisions:

=== Tandem Group Cycles ===
Tandem Group Cycles designs, manufactures, and distributes bicycles and bicycle accessories under the Boss, Claud Butler, British Eagle, Dawes, Elswick, Pulse, Falcon, Squish, and Townsend brands.

=== MV Sports and Leisure ===
MV Sports and Leisure owns and licenses various rights to design, develop and distribute sporting goods products under various brands, including: Ben Sayers, Hedstrom, Pot Black, Kickmaster, Marvel Avengers, Barbie, Batman, Bing, Bored, Cars, Disney Princess, E-Moto, Fireman Sam, Frozen, Hot Wheels, Incredibles, Jurassic World Fallen Kingdom, Justice League, Li-Fe, The Lion King, L.O.L Surprise!, Minions, Minnie Mouse, Miraculous, My Little Pony, Nerf, Nickelodeon Slime, Paw Patrol, Peppa Pig, PJ Masks, Ricky Zoom, Spider-Man, Sponge Bob, Street Quins, Stunted, Thomas and Friends, Toy Story, Transformers, Trolls, Twista, U-Move, Wigwam, Wired, and Zoomies.

=== Expressco Direct ===
Expressco sells garden and outdoor products (Garden Comforts), mobility scooters (Pro Rider Mobility), home (At Home Comforts) and leisure products Pro Rider Leisure). The company sells gazebos, party tents, trampolines, and outdoor play products through its brand Airwave, home products including radiator covers with the Jack Stonehouse brand, Pro Rider branded mobility scooters, and electric golf trolleys and snap frames through the SnapFrames website.

== Acquisitions and partnerships ==
In August 2014, the group purchased Pro Rider Mobility Limited for £2.5M with additional consideration of up to £1 million.

On 2 September 2015, the group took over E.S.C (Europe) Ltd in a deal of £2.1 million with additional consideration of up to £750,000.

On 20 June 2018, BikeZaar collaborated with Tandem Group Cycles.

In July 2023, Tandem Group announced a partnership with Cyclefit.
