= Hedstrom =

Hedstrom, Hedström and Hedstrøm are surnames of Swedish and Norwegian origin which may refer to:

- Åse Hedstrøm
- John Maynard Hedstrom
- Jonathan Hedström (born 1977), Swedish professional ice hockey player
- Lars Hedström (1919–2004), Swedish diplomat
- Lotta Hedström (born 1955), Swedish politician of the Green Party
- Ludvig Hedström (born 2001), Swedish professional ice hockey player
- Margaret Hedstrom (born 1953), American archivist
- Olof Gustaf Hedstrom (1803–1877), Swedish-American minister
- Oscar Hedstrom (1871–1960), Swedish-born American motorcycle designer
- Øystein Hedstrøm (born 1946), Norwegian politician for the Progress Party
- Tina Hedström (1942–1984), Swedish actress
- Tuva Moa Matilda Karolina Novotny Hedström

The name of Swedish immigrants in the 19th century to America were often changed to more phonetic friendly variations. One example is the last name "headstream" that is the English counterpart of the Swedish surname "Hedstrom."
