= Wearwell =

British cycle and motorcycle manufacturer

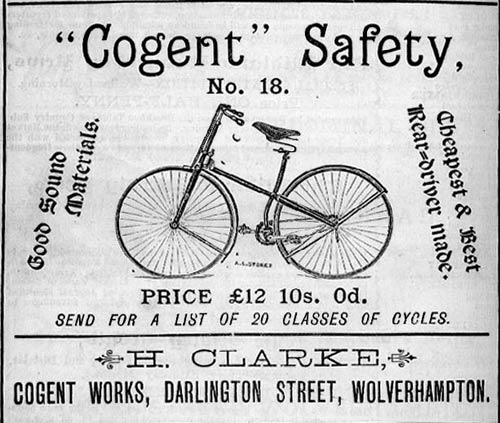
1887 Cogent Safety bicycle

The Wearwell Cycle Company was a bicycle manufacturing company founded in 1889 in Wolverhampton by the five sons of Henry Clarke, founder of the late Cogent Cycle Company. Wearwell were also motorcycle manufacturers under the Wearwell Stevens, Wolf and Wulfruna brands.

In 1928 Jack Waine and his brother George Waine took over the Wearwell Cycle Company Ltd. from the liquidators of the Wulfruna Engineering Co Ltd. The new company was registered as the Wearwell Cycle Co. (1928) Ltd and Jack's son Vincent and George's son Theo were brought on as Directors. They also purchased the plant, tools and stock-in-trade of the cycle manufacturing side of the Vulcan Manufacturing Co. (Wolverhampton) Ltd.

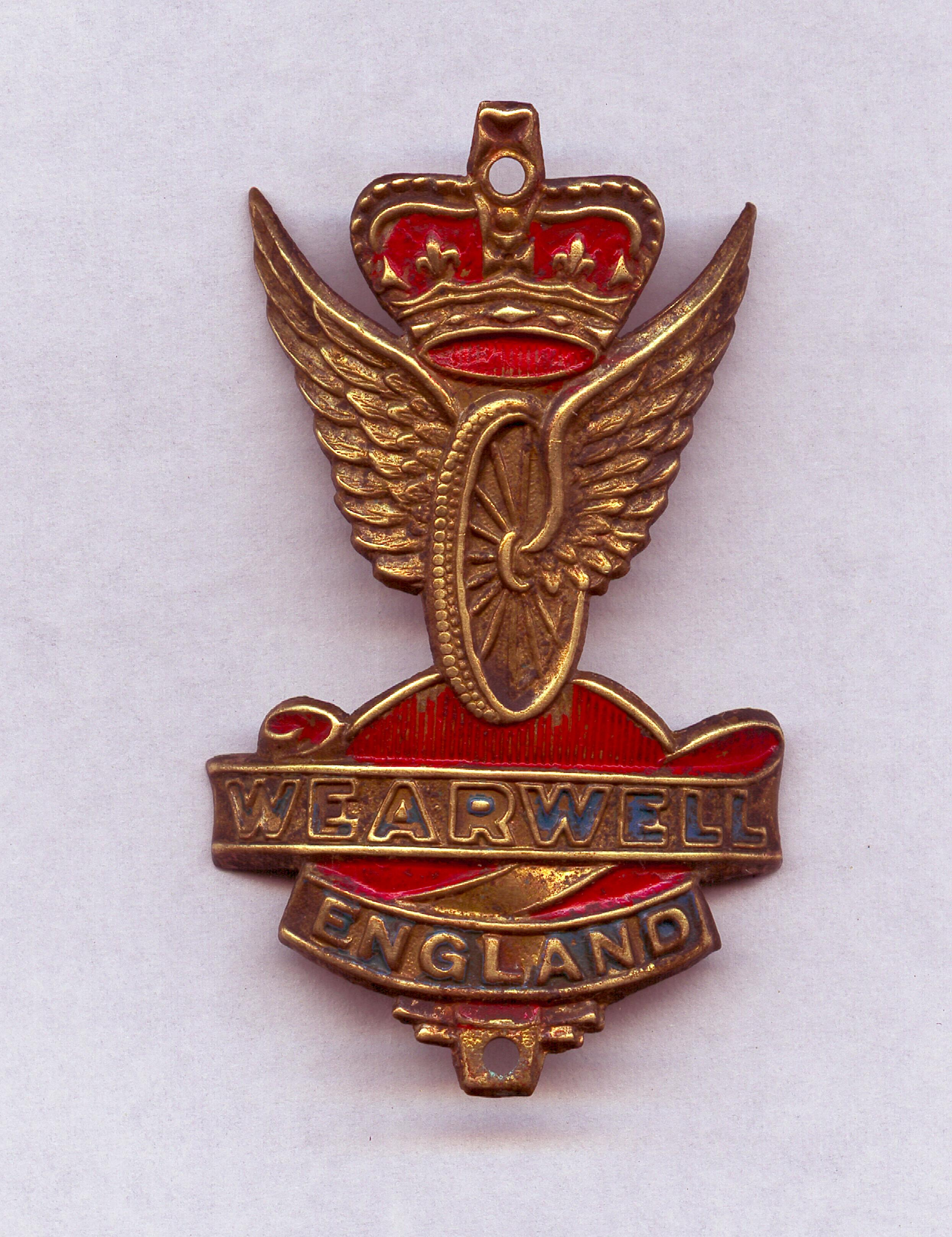
The Wearwell Cycle Company crest

By 1929 a full range of cycles was offered including tradesmen's cycles, juvenile cycles, scooters, and the distinctive 'Duplex'. In 1931 the company showed the new 'Schneider' sports machine at Olympia, and a cheaper version called the 'Wanderer'.

The company produced motorcycles until the outbreak of World War II, from which point they manufactured only bicycles. The factory was partly destroyed by fire during an air raid but some production was soon restored. After World War II production of cycles continued and motorcycle production resumed.

By the middle of the 20th Century, 75% of the company's production was exported to over 30 different countries. The company began sponsoring a professional cycle team through the 1950s, winning the Tour of Britain cycle race in 1953, which was amongst the team's best domestic racing highlights. Riders in the victorious Wearwell Cycle Company Team were Les Scales, John Pottier, Ian Greenfield, Trevor Fenwick, Ken Mitchell and John Welch.

The Vulcan Manufacturing group went into voluntary liquidation in 1969, and its assets were sold off. In 1972 Wearwell Cycle Company was sold off and its production was moved out of Wolverhampton to Aleveley, near Bridgnorth, but was subsequently sold onto Elswick-Hopper Cycle Company where production was moved to Brigg in Lincolnshire. It survived a few more years until the company was finally closed in 1975. A great-great-grandson has revived the Wearwell name in 2017 as a cycling clothes company.
